= List of Supreme Court of Canada cases (Laskin Court) =

This is a chronological list of notable cases decided by the Supreme Court of Canada from the appointment of Bora Laskin in 1973 as Chief Justice to his death in office in 1984. Laskin was the first Chief Justice to hear cases under the Charter of Rights and Freedoms implemented in 1982.

== 1973 – 1974 ==
| Case name | Citation | Date | Subject |
|---|---|---|---|
December 27, 1973 – Bora Laskin is appointed as Chief Justice of Canada
| Calder v British Columbia (AG) | [1973] SCR 313 | January 31, 1973 | Aboriginal rights |
| Jordan House Hotel Ltd v Menow | [1974] SCR 239 | | commercial host liability |
| Canadian Aero Service Ltd v O'Malley | [1974] SCR 592 | June 29, 1973 | corporate director's fiduciary duties |
| Canada (AG) v Lavell | [1974] SCR 1349 | August 27, 1973 | equality, Bill of Rights |
| Moran v Pyle National (Canada) Ltd | [1975] 1 SCR 393 | | Conflict of laws |
| Murdoch v Murdoch | [1975] 1 SCR 423 | | Division of matrimonial property |

== 1975 – 1979 ==
| Case name | Citation | Date | Subject |
|---|---|---|---|
| Kienapple v R | [1975] 1 SCR 729 | | the "kienapple" principle of multiple criminal charges |
| Jones v New Brunswick (AG) | [1975] 2 SCR 182 | | validity of Official Languages Act |
| Interprovincial Cooperatives Ltd v R | (1975), [1976] 1 SCR 477 | | constitutional extraterritoriality |
| Morgentaler v The Queen | [1976] 1 SCR 616 | March 26, 1975 | abortion |
| Harrison v Carswell | [1976] 2 SCR 200 | | pre-Charter right to protest |
| Morgan v Prince Edward Island (AG) | [1976] 2 SCR 349 | | limiting right to own land |
| Reference Re Anti-Inflation Act | [1976] 2 SCR 373 | July 12, 1976 | peace, order and good government power |
| MacDonald v Vapor Canada Ltd | [1977] 2 SCR 134 | | constitutionality of the Trade-marks Act |
| Amax Potash Ltd v Saskatchewan | [1977] 2 SCR 576 | October 5, 1976 | Ability of government to protect itself from unfavourable findings on federalism issues. |
| Miller v R | [1977] 2 SCR 680 | | Bill of Rights; Cruel and unusual punishment |
| R v Leary | [1978] 1 SCR 29 | March 8, 1977 | intoxication defence |
| Kruger v R | [1978] 1 SCR 104 | May 31, 1977 | Indian Act and provincial gaming laws |
| Smithers v R | [1978] 1 SCR 506 | May 17, 1977 | criminal causation test |
| Capital Cities Communications Inc v Canadian Radio-Television Commission | [1978] 2 SCR 141 | November 30, 1977 | federal works and undertakings |
| Quebec (AG) v Kellogg's Co of Canada | [1978] 2 SCR 211 | January 19, 1978 | freedom of expression |
| Arnold v Teno | [1978] 2 SCR 287 | January 19, 1978 | duty of care; unforeseeable plaintiff |
| Nova Scotia (Board of Censors) v McNeil | [1978] 2 SCR 662 | January 19, 1978 | federalism; provincial power to censor |
| Canada (AG) v Montreal (City of) | [1978] 2 SCR 770 | January 19, 1978 | Federalism and municipal power to create preventative by-laws |
| Reference Re Agricultural Products Marketing Act | [1978] 2 SCR 1198 | | |
| R v Sault Ste-Marie (City of) | [1978] 2 SCR 1299 | May 1, 1978 | strict liability offences |
| Manitoba Fisheries Ltd v R | [1979] 1 SCR 101 | October 3, 1978 | expropriation; regulatory taking |
| Bliss v Canada (AG) | [1979] 1 SCR 183 | October 31, 1978 | Canadian Bill of Rights |
| R v Hauser | [1979] 1 SCR 984 | May 1, 1979 | federalism; peace, order and good government |
| Cherneskey v Armadale Publishers Ltd | [1979] 1 SCR 1067 | November 21, 1978 | defamation |
| Canadian Union of Public Employees, Local 963 v New Brunswick Liquor Corp | [1979] 2 SCR 227 | | judicial review |
| Dunlop v R | [1979] 2 SCR 881 | May 31, 1979 | aiding and abetting |
| Lewis v R | [1979] 2 SCR 821 | June 14, 1979 | Murder; motive |
| Quebec (AG) v Blaikie (No 1) | [1979] 2 SCR 1016 | December 13, 1979 | language rights |

== 1980 – 1984 ==
| Case name | Citation | Date | Subject |
|---|---|---|---|
| Solosky v R | [1980] 1 SCR 821 | December 21, 1979 | solicitor-client privilege |
| Labatt Breweries of Canada Ltd v Canada (AG) | [1980] 1 SCR 914 | | federal legislative power |
| Pappajohn v R | [1980] 2 SCR 120 | May 20, 1980 | rape defence |
| Pettkus v Becker | [1980] 2 SCR 834 | December 18, 1980 | unjust enrichment |
| Reibl v Hughes | [1980] 2 SCR 880 | October 7, 1980 | duty to disclose |
| R v Ron Engineering and Construction (Eastern) Ltd | [1981] 1 SCR 111 | January 27, 1981 | offer and acceptance |
| Re Residential Tenancies Act, 1979 | [1981] 1 SCR 714 | May 28, 1981 | jurisdiction of courts |
| Seneca College v Bhadauria | [1981] 2 S.C.R. 181 | June 22, 1981 | Human rights, tort, discrimination |
| Patriation Reference | [1981] 1 SCR 753 | September 28, 1981 | patriation of the Constitution of Canada |
| Canada (Minister of Justice) v Borowski | [1981] 2 SCR 575 | December 1, 1981 | public interest standing |
| Ontario (Human Rights Commission) v Etobicoke (Borough of) | [1982] 1 SCR 202 | February 9, 1982 | age discrimination |
April 17, 1982 - The Constitution Act, 1982, which includes the Charter of Rights and Freedoms, enters into effect
| Vetrovec v R | [1982] 1 SCR 811 | May 31, 1982 | evidence |
| Descôteaux v Mierzwinski | [1982] 1 SCR 860 | June 23, 1982 | privilege |
| Multiple Access Ltd v McCutcheon | [1982] 2 SCR 161 | August 9, 1982 | overlapping federal and provincial laws |
| Shell Oil Co v Canada (Commissioner of Patents) | [1982] 2 SCR 536 | November 2, 1982 | patents |
| Quebec Veto Reference | [1982] 2 SCR 793 | December 6, 1982 | Quebec veto |
| Graat v R | [1982] 2 SCR 819 | December 21, 1982 | opinion evidence |
| Westendorp v R | [1983] 1 SCR 43 | January 25, 1983 | division of powers |
| Canada (Labour Relations Board) v Paul L'Anglais Inc | [1983] 1 SCR 147 | February 8, 1983 | jurisdiction of courts |
| R v Saskatchewan Wheat Pool | [1983] 1 SCR 205 | February 8, 1983 | tort of breach of statutory duty |
| R v Perka | [1984] 2 SCR 232 | October 11, 1984 | defence of necessity |
| Re Upper Churchill Water Rights Reversion Act | [1984] 1 SCR 297 | May 3, 1984 | provincial legislative power |
March 26, 1984 – death of Chief Justice Bora Laskin

== See also ==
- List of Judicial Committee of the Privy Council cases
- List of notable Canadian Courts of Appeals cases
