= Section 91(27) of the Constitution Act, 1867 =

Grant of Canadian criminal law to the federal government

Section 91(27) of the Constitution Act, 1867, also known as the criminal law power, grants the Parliament of Canada the authority to legislate on:

27. The Criminal Law, except the Constitution of Courts of Criminal Jurisdiction, but including the Procedure in Criminal Matters.

== Scope of the federal power ==
Section 91(27) is by and large the broadest of the enumerated powers allocated to the federal government. As noted by Estey J. in Scowby v. Glendinning:

11. ...The terms of s. 91(27) of the Constitution must be read as assigning to Parliament exclusive jurisdiction over criminal law in the widest sense of the term. Provincial legislation which in pith and substance falls inside the perimeter of that term broadly defined is ultra vires. Parliament's legislative jurisdiction properly founded on s. 91(27) may have a destructive force on encroaching legislation from provincial legislatures, but such is the nature of the allocation procedure in ss. 91 and 92 of the Constitution. Here we are not concerned with the result in law of the exercise by Parliament of one of its exclusive heads of jurisdiction. Indeed, the converse is the question: what, if anything, is the result in law of legislation by a province where it may be classified as essentially criminal in nature? Basic principles require the conclusion that such legislation is invalid, regardless of any perceived need for its substantive provisions, and regardless of perceived defects or gaps in the federal legislative plan...

=== History and jurisprudence ===
The meaning of the phrase "criminal law" was historically a matter of debate. It was first defined by Lord Haldane of the Judicial Committee of the Privy Council, writing in the opinion for the Board of Commerce case, as that area:

"where the subject matter is one which by its very nature belongs to the domain of criminal jurisprudence".

In Proprietary Articles Trade Association v. Attorney General of Canada, Lord Atkin, writing for the Council, rejected this interpretation:

It certainly is not confined to what was criminal by the law of England or of any province in 1867. The power must extend to legislation to make new crimes. Criminal law connotes only the quality of such acts or omissions as are prohibited under appropriate penal provisions by authority of the State. The criminal quality of an act cannot be discerned by intuition; nor can it be discovered by reference to any standard but one: Is the act prohibited with penal consequences?

The modern interpretation was articulated by Rand J. in the Margarine Reference where the Court stated:

A crime is an act which the law, with appropriate penal sanctions, forbids; but as prohibitions are not enacted in a vacuum, we can properly look for some evil or injurious or undesirable effect upon the public against which the law is directed. That effect may be in relation to social, economic or political interests; and the legislature has had in mind to suppress the evil or to safeguard the interest threatened. ...

...Is the prohibition then enacted with a view to a public purpose which can support it as being in relation to criminal law? Public peace, order, security, health, morality: these are the ordinary though not exclusive ends served by that law...

Therefore, the following must be met for a law to be criminal in nature:

- it must consist of a prohibition,
- it must impose a penalty,
- the law must be directed towards a public purpose, but
- the courts will strike down federal legislation which tries to disguise regulatory purposes lying within provincial jurisdiction by casting the statute as a prohibition enforced by criminal sanction for breach.

The issues relating to prohibitions and penalties can be approached separately, as noted by Laskin C.J. in Attorney General of Canada v. Canadian National Transportation, Ltd.:

It is certainly open to the Parliament of Canada, in legislating in relation to s. 91(27), to take a disjunctive view of the very wide criminal law power which it possesses. Thus, it can view it in its character as establishing offences and also as empowering it to prescribe penalties for their breach. It is my view that it has drawn such a distinction in vesting prosecutorial authority in the federal Attorney General under s. 2(2) when it referred to non-Criminal Code offences, leaving the question of penal liability dependent on what is prescribed under such offences.

=== Nature of a public purpose ===
Such interests have been extended to include matters such as the environment, as noted in R. v. Hydro-Québec.

In addition, the power has been held to extend to the regulation of dangerous products, as noted in Reference re Firearms Act (control of firearms and licensing of owners) and RJR-MacDonald Inc. v. Canada (Attorney General) (control of tobacco products).

=== Limitations ===
The criminal law power is not unlimited in scope, as noted recently in the Reference re Assisted Human Reproduction Act, where the majority held that it is not enough to identify a public purpose that would have justified Parliament’s action — it must also involve suppressing an evil or safeguarding a threatened interest. The evil must be real and the apprehension of harm must be reasonable. Recourse to the criminal law power cannot be based solely on concerns for efficiency or consistency, as such concerns, viewed in isolation, do not fall under the criminal law.

There are limits to the power's extent under the Canadian Charter of Rights and Freedoms, most notably on the question of proportionality. In R. v. Big M Drug Mart Ltd., Dickson J. asserted that limitations on rights must be motivated by an objective of sufficient importance. Moreover, the limit must be as small as possible. In R. v. Oakes, he elaborated on the standard when one David Oakes was accused of selling narcotics. Dickson for a unanimous Court found that Oakes' rights had been violated because he had been presumed guilty. This violation was not justified under the second step of the following two-step process:

1. There must be a pressing and substantial objective
2. The means must be proportional

- it must be rationally connected to the objective
- there must be minimal impairment of rights
- there must be proportionality between the infringement and objective

The test is heavily founded in factual analysis so strict adherence is not always practiced. A degree of overlap is to be expected as there are some factors, such as vagueness, which are to be considered in multiple sections. If the legislation fails any of the above branches, it is unconstitutional. Otherwise the impugned law passes the Oakes test and remains valid.

== Types of offences in Canadian law ==
There are a variety of offences that can be prosecuted in Canadian courts, but not all of them can be considered as criminal in nature. In R. v. City of Sault Ste-Marie, they were classified into the following categories, of which only the first qualifies as criminal (and therefore under federal jurisdiction):

1. Offences in which mens rea, consisting of some positive state of mind such as intent, knowledge, or recklessness, must be proved by the prosecution either as an inference from the nature of the act committed, or by additional evidence.

2. Offences in which there is no necessity for the prosecution to prove the existence of mens rea; the doing of the prohibited act prima facie imports the offence, leaving it open to the accused to avoid liability by proving that he took all reasonable care. This involves consideration of what a reasonable person would have done in the circumstances. The defence will be available if the accused reasonably believed in a mistaken set of facts which, if true, would render the act or omission innocent, or if he took all reasonable steps to avoid the particular event. These offences may properly be called offences of strict liability.

3. Offences of absolute liability where it is not open to the accused to exculpate himself by showing that he was free of fault.

Regulatory offences are subject to the Canadian Charter of Rights and Freedoms. In that regard, The Supreme Court of Canada has ruled:

- in R. v. Wholesale Travel Group Inc., where they possess a mens rea component of negligence, coupled with a defence of due diligence, they will not violate section 7 of the Charter; and
- in Re B.C. Motor Vehicle Act, the combination of absolute liability and possible imprisonment violates section 7 and will rarely be upheld under section 1.

== Provincial jurisdiction ==
Related powers are available to the provincial legislatures under the following headings of section 92:

9. Shop, Saloon, Tavern, Auctioneer, and other Licences in order to the raising of a Revenue for Provincial, Local, or Municipal Purposes.

14. The Administration of Justice in the Province, including the Constitution, Maintenance, and Organization of Provincial Courts, both of Civil and of Criminal Jurisdiction, and including Procedure in Civil Matters in those Courts.

15. The Imposition of Punishment by Fine, Penalty, or Imprisonment for enforcing any Law of the Province made in relation to any Matter coming within any of the Classes of Subjects enumerated in this Section.

16. Generally all Matters of a merely local or private Nature in the Province.

=== Administration of justice ===
This power entitles the provinces to establish police forces, prosecution services, penitentiaries, parole services, and ancillary agencies associated with the administration of criminal justice in the province. By its nature, its operation is interconnected with the criminal law power.

As held in Attorney General of Canada v. Canadian National Transportation, Ltd., the administration of justice does not embrace prosecutorial authority respecting the federal criminal law. This can be exercised by either level of government under terms prescribed by federal law.

=== Fines and penalties ===
A province can attach criminal penalties to valid provincial laws. Consequently, there is frequent debate over whether a provincial law is intruding upon the federal criminal law power.

Where the province enacts a regulatory scheme that contains penalties, and that concerns matters normally within its jurisdiction, the law is typically upheld.

- In Bedard v. Dawson, a provincial law that shut down "disorderly houses" within the meaning of the Criminal Code was held to be in relation to property and civil rights.
- In Provincial Secretary of Prince Edward Island v. Egan and O'Grady v. Sparling, provincial driving offences that overlapped with federal driving offences were upheld as concerning the regulation of highway traffic.

=== Matters of a local or private nature ===
Penal laws regulating matters of a local nature have been upheld, as in:

- Dupond v. Montreal (parades in the streets), and
- Nova Scotia Board of Censors v. McNeil (film censorship).

However, regulation of activities in the street have not always been upheld. In Westendorp v. The Queen, the Court struck down a provincial law (authorizing municipalities to pass bylaws for prohibiting persons remaining in the street for the purposes of prostitution) as it was attempting to "control or punish prostitution".

=== Licensing ===
Licensing schemes have been frequently challenged as encroaching on the federal power. In Rio Hotel Ltd. v. New Brunswick (Liquor Licensing Board), a provincial licensing scheme required a liquor license to be accompanied by an entertainment licence to which conditions could be attached with respect to live entertainment and contests held on the licensed premises. The conditions attaching the entertainment licence in question specified the degree of nudity acceptable and rules for staging events presupposing the removal of clothing. The Court held it to be regulating entertainment as a means to boost alcohol sales. Though there are provisions within the Criminal Code dealing with nudity, they did not conflict with the provincial law, as breach of the latter could result in suspension or cancellation of the liquor licence, but did not entail any penal consequences.
