= Westendorp v R =

- Supreme Court of Canada

Hearing: December 2, 1982 Judgment: January 25, 1983
- Full case name: Lenore Jacqueline Westendorp v Her Majesty The Queen
- Citations: [1983] 1 S.C.R. 43
- Docket No.: 17071
- Ruling: Westendorp appeal allowed

Court membership
- Chief Justice: Bora Laskin; Puisne Justices: Roland Ritchie, Brian Dickson, Jean Beetz, Willard Estey, William McIntyre, Julien Chouinard, Antonio Lamer, Bertha Wilson

Reasons given
- Unanimous reasons by: Laskin C.J.

Westendorp v R, [1983] 1 S.C.R. 43 was a decision of the Supreme Court of Canada on the scope of the federal Parliament's criminal law power under section 91(27) of the Constitution Act, 1867. A unanimous Court found that a municipal by-law that prohibited standing in the street for the purpose of prostitution was in the nature of a criminal law prohibition and therefore ultra vires of the provincial constitutional authority. The decision surprised many legal scholars who considered it to be inconsistent with previous Supreme Court cases where provincial laws of a moral nature were upheld under the provincial power (see Canada (AG) v Montreal (City of), [1978] and Nova Scotia (Board of Censors) v McNeil [1978]). This was also the first case where the Canadian Charter of Rights and Freedoms was cited in argument to the Supreme Court, although the Charter argument was ultimately abandoned during the hearing.

== Background ==
Lenore Westendorp and a friend approached an undercover police officer on a street in Calgary and solicited him for sex. They were both arrested and charged under a municipal by-law that prohibited being on the street for the purpose of prostitution.

At trial, Westendorp was found guilty under the by-law.

Westendorp appealed to the Supreme Court on the grounds that the law was unconstitutional as it was criminal law and should only be legislated by the federal government.

== Constitutional challenge of the by-law ==
The language was quite broad: "No person shall be, or remain on a street, for the purpose of prostitution." The follow-up section stated that no person shall approach a person for the purposes of prostitution. There was nothing about communication or other specific act, and the penalties were much higher than others mentioned in the same by-law. The stated basis of the bylaw was to facilitate the use of the streets, by avoiding the creation of crowds, both vehicular and pedestrian – in essence, to avoid a public nuisance.

== Opinion of the Court ==
Laskin C.J., writing for a unanimous Court, held that the law was ultra vires the province. Laskin found that the law was "colourable", as its true purpose was not to keep the streets safe but to control or punish prostitution. He held that:

If a province or municipality may translate a direct attack on prostitution into street control through reliance on public nuisance, it may do the same with respect to trafficking in drugs. And, may it not, on the same view, seek to punish assaults that take place on city streets as an aspect of street control! However desirable it may be for the municipality to control or prohibit prostitution, there has been an overreaching in the present case which offends the division of legislative powers. (p. 53–54)

If the purpose was to stop nuisances, why not prevent any two people from approaching each other? The court decided that what was occurring was that a municipality disapproved of prostitution, and was attempting to enact a criminal law in order to discourage it. The court was also concerned with the precedent that may be created by legislation of this type; were it to be allowed, then it could have broad-reaching consequences on the criminal code where cities could create duplicate laws.

This case is seen as going against the grain of most case law in this area, where the court has struck down legislation formed on the basis of provincial power, holding that it was an attempt to intrude on criminal law power.

Counsel for Westendorp raised the Charter of Rights in submissions to the Court, but abandoned the Charter argument during the oral hearing.

== See also ==
- List of Supreme Court of Canada cases (Laskin Court)
- Prostitution law in Canada
