= Lewis v R =

- Supreme Court of Canada

Hearing: November 21, 1978 Judgment: June 14, 1979
- Full case name: James Wilbrod Lewis v Her Majesty The Queen
- Citations: [1979] 2 S.C.R. 821

Court membership
- Chief Justice: Bora Laskin; Puisne Justices: Ronald Martland, Roland Ritchie, Wishart Spence, Louis-Philippe Pigeon, Brian Dickson, Jean Beetz, Willard Estey, Yves Pratte

Reasons given
- Unanimous reasons by: Dickson J.

Lewis v R, [1979] 2 S.C.R. 821 is a famous decision of the Supreme Court of Canada on the relevance of motive in a criminal trial. The Court held that motive is never an essential element of a criminal offence but can be used as evidence to prove intent.

== Background ==
James Lewis and Santa Tatlay were charged with the murder of Parmjeet and Gurmail Sidhu, Tatlay's daughter and her husband. The Crown alleged that Tatlay had hired Lewis to kill the victims using an electric kettle rigged with dynamite.

At trial Lewis admitted mailing the package containing the bomb, but argued that he had been fooled by Tatlay to do so. Both accused were convicted and was upheld on appeal.

Lewis appealed to the Supreme Court on grounds that the trial judge failed to instruct the jury on the issue of motive.

The issue before the Supreme Court was whether the motive or underlying reason for the crime is relevant in establishing mens rea.

== Reasons of the court ==
Justice Dickson, writing for a unanimous Court, held that the trial judge did not err in failing to instruct the jury on the relevance of motive.

Dickson formulated several principles of "motive" or "ulterior intention":

1. As evidence, motive is always relevant and hence evidence of motive is admissible.
2. Motive is no part of the crime and is legally irrelevant to criminal responsibility. It is not an essential element of the prosecution's case as a matter of law.
3. Proved absence of motive is always an important fact in favour of the accused and ordinarily worthy of note in a charge to the jury.
4. Conversely, proved presence of motive may be an important factual ingredient in the Crown's case, notably on the issues of the identity and intention, when the evidence is purely circumstantial.
5. Motive is therefore always a question of fact and evidence and the necessity of referring to motive in the charge to the jury falls within the general duty of the trial judge "to not only outline the theories of the prosecution and defence but to give the jury matters of evidence essential in arriving at a just conclusion."
6. Each case will turn on its own unique set of circumstances. The issue of motive is always a matter of degree

== See also ==
- List of Supreme Court of Canada cases (Laskin Court)
