= Pappajohn v R =

- Supreme Court of Canada

Hearing: October 22, 1979 Judgment: May 20, 1980
- Full case name: George Pappajohn v Her Majesty The Queen
- Citations: [1980] 2 S.C.R. 120
- Ruling: Pappajohn appeal dismissed

Court membership
- Chief Justice: Bora Laskin; Puisne Justices: Ronald Martland, Roland Ritchie, Louis-Philippe Pigeon, Brian Dickson, Jean Beetz, Willard Estey, William McIntyre, Julien Chouinard

Reasons given
- Majority: McIntyre J., joined by Martland, Pigeon, Beetz and Chouinard JJ.
- Concurrence: Martland J.
- Dissent: Dickson J., joined by Estey J.

Pappajohn v R, [1980] 2 S.C.R. 120 is a famous Supreme Court of Canada decision on the criminal defence of mistake of fact.

== Background ==
George Pappajohn put his house up for sale through a real-estate company. He met with a female real-estate agent from the company at a bar. They had lunch together, including drinks, over the course of approximately three hours, after which the two went to Pappajohn's house where they engaged in sexual intercourse.

The agent claimed that she was raped. However, Pappajohn claims that short of a few coy objections she had consented. After the event the woman was seen running out of the house naked, wearing a bow-tie, with her hands bound, and was in great distress.

During the trial the issue arose of whether the defence of mistake of fact should be put to the jury. Namely, whether Pappajohn should be able to claim that he mistakenly believed that she had consented. The trial judge refused to allow the defence and Pappajohn was convicted.

== Opinion of the Court ==
The majority opinion was written by Justice McIntyre. He first discussed the question of when a defence should be put to a jury. He held that a defence should be used when there is "some evidence which would convey a sense of reality in the submission." On the facts, he found that there was no evidence, other than the statement of the accused, that if believed, would have allowed for the possibility of consent. Accordingly, the lower court ruling was upheld.

Justice Dickson took a different approach to the defence of mistake of fact. He stated that the defence was derived from the mens rea requirement, which is a subjective standard, and consequently the mistaken belief did not need to be reasonable.

== Aftermath ==
The federal government later amended the criminal offence to require that the jury should "consider the presence or absence of reasonable grounds for that belief." Sec 265(4). http://laws.justice.gc.ca/eng/C-46/page-6.html#anchorbo-ga:l_VIII-gb:s_264_1

The Supreme Court itself clarified the law in the case of R. v. Sansregret (generally indexed as Sansregret v. The Queen, [1985] 1 S.C.R. 570), where it excluded the defense of mistake of fact where the defendant is found to be "wilfully blind" http://scc.lexum.umontreal.ca/en/1985/1985scr1-570/1985scr1-570.htm.

== See also ==
- List of Supreme Court of Canada cases (Laskin Court)
