= Capital Cities Communications Inc v Canadian Radio-Television Commission =

Capital Cities Communications v. CRTC
- Supreme Court of Canada

Hearing: January 26, 27, 28, 1977 Judgment: November 30, 1977
- Full case name: Capital Cities Communications Inc., Taft Broadcasting Company and WBEN, Inc. v. Canadian Radio-Television Commission
- Citations: [1978] 2 S.C.R. 141
- Prior history: Appeal from Federal Court of Appeal
- Ruling: cable television as well as broadcast television, are the jurisdiction of the federal government

Court membership
- Chief Justice: Bora Laskin; Puisne Justices: Ronald Martland, Roland Ritchie, Wishart Spence, Louis-Philippe Pigeon, Brian Dickson, Jean Beetz, Willard Estey, Yves Pratte

Reasons given
- Majority: Laskin C.J., joined by Martland, Judson, Ritchie, Spence and Dickson JJ.
- Dissent: Pigeon J., joined by Beetz and de Grandpré JJ.

Capital Cities Communications v. CRTC (1977), [1978] 2 S.C.R. 141 is a Supreme Court of Canada decision on the legislative jurisdiction of cable television. Chief Justice Laskin, writing for the majority of the Court, held that all television, even where exclusively produced and distributed within the province, fell within the definition of a federal undertaking under section 92(10)(a) of the Constitution Act, 1867.

Rogers Cable provided a subscription cable television service which included access to American television stations. In 1974, the Canadian Radio-Television Commission (by the time of the decision renamed the Canadian Radio-television and Telecommunications Commission, in both cases abbreviated CRTC), a federal regulatory agency, permitted Rogers to randomly replace selected commercial messages on the American stations it carried with its own promotional messages, after turning down a request for the cable provider to sell advertising time of its own on the stations, though leaving open the possibility of partnering with Canadian stations to do so. The CRTC's better-known simultaneous substitution policy, involving full replacements of American broadcasts with Canadian broadcasts of the same programs, was not mentioned in the decision.

The owners of three Buffalo, New York, television stations affected by the decision—Capital Cities Communications, owner of WKBW-TV; Taft Broadcasting, which owned WGR-TV; and the local owners of WBEN-TV—opposed any replacements of their advertising, and challenged the commission's jurisdiction in this matter.

The issue before the Court was whether the federal government had legislative jurisdiction over the content of cable television.

Laskin held that both cable and broadcast television were both within the jurisdiction of the federal government.

This decision was released along with the accompanying case Dionne v. Quebec (Public Service Board) [1978] 2 S.C.R. 191.

== See also ==
- List of Supreme Court of Canada cases (Laskin Court)
