= Dunlop and Sylvester v. The Queen =

Supreme Court of Canada criminal law decision

- Supreme Court of Canada

Hearing: December 6, 1978 Judgment: May 31, 1979
- Full case name: Randy James Dunlop and Graham Stanley Sylvester v. Her Majesty The Queen
- Citations: [1979] 2 S.C.R. 881
- Ruling: Appeal allowed

Court membership
- Chief Justice: Bora Laskin; Puisne Justices: Ronald Martland, Roland Ritchie, Wishart Spence, Louis-Philippe Pigeon, Brian Dickson, Jean Beetz, Willard Estey, Yves Pratte

Reasons given
- Plurality: Dickson (Laskin, Spence, and Estey concurring)
- Concurrence: Pratte (Beetz concurring)
- Dissent: Martland (Ritchie and Pigeon concurring)

Dunlop and Sylvester v The Queen is a decision of the Supreme Court of Canada on participating in a criminal act by aiding and abetting. The Court held that the mere presence of the accused at the scene of a criminal act is not sufficient to convict the person for aiding and abetting the criminal act. There must be something more.

The Court split on what was required to meet that test. In two separate sets of reasons, Justice Brian Dickson and Justice Yves Pratte held that the test was not met on the facts of the case. They therefore allowed the appeal of the two accused and entered acquittals. Justice Ronald Martland dissented and held that there had been enough evidence to warrant the jury considering the issue. He would have dismissed the appeal.

== Facts ==
Dunlop and Sylvester were members of a motorcycle club in Winnipeg, the Spartans. They were charged and convicted of participating in a gang rape of a young woman at an abandoned dump on the outskirts of Winnipeg.

The complainant testified that she and another young woman met two other men at the beverage room at the Waldorf Hotel in Winnipeg. One was a member of the Spartans and the other was a prospect for membership. Dunlop joined them at their table at one point. The two women and the two other men later left and went to the abandoned dump. The complainant was by herself when four men in Spartans colours arrived, forcibly carried her to a location by a creek, and began to rape her. Other men in Spartans colours arrived and participated in the rape. She estimated that there were eighteen men in all. The next day, she picked Dunlop and Sylvester out of police lineups. She testified that she had seen their faces by the light of a bonfire that had been lit.

Dunlop and Sylvester both testified. Dunlop stated that he had attended a meeting of the Spartans at the dump earlier in the evening. He later went to the Waldorf beverage room, where there were several other Spartans. He met the complainant and her friend and had some beer with them at their table. When they left with the other two men, he stayed behind, shooting pool. He and Sylvester left the Waldorf around 1 a.m. and went to a discotheque, where they stayed for about half an hour. Sylvester had been told to bring some beer to the dump, so they bought beer and arrived at the dump by 2.15 a.m. Dunlop testified that the group was angry with them for taking so long to deliver the beer. He also testified that he saw a woman having intercourse with a man by the creek, that he did not go near them, and that he and Sylvester left shortly afterwards. He denied having intercourse with the complainant, or in assisting anyone else to do so. Sylvester's testimony was similar.

== Lower court decisions ==
The two accused were tried before a judge and jury, in the Manitoba Queen's Bench. The trial judge's initial instructions to the jury were based on the issue of whether they were convinced that accused had participated in the rape, based on the testimony the jury had heard. The trial judge instructed them on the concept of principal offender, and also aiders and abettors, under s. 21(1) of the Criminal Code. After two hours and twenty-five minutes of deliberation, the jury returned with a question: "If the accused were aware of a rape taking place in their presence and did nothing to prevent or persuade the discontinuance of the act, are they considered as an accomplice to the act under law?"

For the first time in the proceedings, the Crown prosecutor submitted that the judge should instruct the jury on the concept of parties to the offence. The trial judge agreed, and gave the jury instructions on parties to an offence under s. 21(2) of the Criminal Code, referring to the possibilities that an accused had a common intention to commit the offence, or had failed to take steps to prevent an offence by another person. The jury resumed deliberations and returned with guilty verdicts fifteen minutes later.

The two accused appealed their convictions to the Manitoba Court of Appeal. By a 3 to 2 majority, the Court of Appeal dismissed their appeal.

== Decision of the Supreme Court ==
The accused then appealed to the Supreme Court. By a 6-3 majority decision on the outcome, the Court allowed the appeal and entered acquittals. However, there was no majority on the reasons for the decision.

=== Reasons of Justice Dickson ===
Justice Brian Dickson wrote reasons for himself, Chief Justice Bora Laskin, and Justices Wishart Spence and Willard Estey. He held that the trial judge had erred in instructing the jury on aiding and abetting, since there was no evidence before the jury to support that conclusion. He also held that from the timing of the jury's question, it was reasonable to conclude that they did not find that the accused had directly participated in the rape. He concluded that the trial judge should have answered the jury's question with a simple "No": "A person is not guilty merely because he is present at the scene of a crime and does nothing to prevent it."

Dickson summarised his conclusions as follows:

In the case at bar I have great difficulty in finding any evidence of anything more than mere presence and passive acquiescence. Presence at the commission of an offence can be evidence of aiding and abetting if accompanied by other factors, such as prior knowledge of the principal offender's intention to commit the offence or attendance for the purpose of encouragement. There was no evidence that while the crime was being committed either of the accused rendered aid, assistance or encouragement to the rape of [the complainant]. (Note: Complainant's name deleted consistent with policies on biographies of living persons; see: WP:AVOIDVICTIM.) There was no evidence of any positive act or omission to facilitate the unlawful purpose.

Accordingly, he would set aside the decisions of the courts below and acquit the two accused.

=== Reasons of Justice Pratte ===
Justice Yves Pratte wrote reasons for himself and Justice Jean Beetz. Like Justice Dickson, he agreed that there had not been sufficient evidence to warrant putting the argument of aiding and abetting before the jury. He also agreed that the judge should not have the jury on being a party to the offence, in response to the jury's question. He did so on narrower grounds than Dickson had proposed, so did not concur with Dickson, but agreed that the appeal should be allowed and the accused acquitted.

=== Reasons of Justice Martland ===
Justice Ronald Martland wrote dissenting reasons for himself and Justices Roland Ritchie and Louis-Philippe Pigeon. He agreed that there was not any evidence of common intention, which would make the accused parties to the offence. However, he disagreed with Dickson's position that the answer to the jury's question should have been a flat "No". He found that there was evidence which a jury could take into account in determining if the accused had aided or abetted, and therefore would dismiss the appeal.

== See also ==
- List of Supreme Court of Canada cases (Laskin Court)
