= Quebec (AG) v Blaikie (No 1) =

- Supreme Court of Canada

Hearing: June 11, 1979 Judgment: December 13, 1979
- Full case name: The Attorney General of the Province of Quebec v Peter M. Blaikie, Roland Durand and Yoine Goldstein; The Attorney General of the Province of Quebec v Henri Wilfrid Laurier
- Citations: [1979] 2 S.C.R. 1016
- Prior history: Judgment against the Attorney General of Quebec in the Court of Appeal for Quebec.
- Ruling: Appeal dismissed

Holding
- Section 133 of the British North America Act (now known as the Constitution Act, 1867) requires that all Acts by the Quebec legislature be printed in English and French and all court proceeding be in either English or French. This section includes regulations issued by the Quebec government as authorized by an Act, and courts established by Quebec.

Court membership
- Chief Justice: Bora Laskin; Puisne Justices: Ronald Martland, Roland Ritchie, Louis-Philippe Pigeon, Brian Dickson, Jean Beetz, Willard Estey, Yves Pratte, William McIntyre

Reasons given
- Unanimous reasons by: The Court
- Chouinard J. took no part in the consideration or decision of the case.

Quebec (AG) v Blaikie (No 1), [1979] 2 S.C.R. 1016 is a leading decision of the Supreme Court of Canada on language rights in the Constitution Act, 1867. The Court held that the sections of Quebec's Charter of the French Language (better-known at the time as "Bill 101"), which required that provincial laws be enacted in French only, violated section 133 of the Constitution Act, 1867.

Section 133 reads as follows:

Either the English or the French Language may be used by any Person in the Debates of the Houses of the Parliament of Canada and of the Houses of the Legislature of Quebec; and both those Languages shall be used in the respective Records and Journals of those Houses; and either of those Languages may be used by any Person or in any Pleading or Process in or issuing from any Court of Canada established under this Act, and in or from all or any of the Courts of Quebec. The Acts of the Parliament of Canada and of the Legislature of Quebec shall be printed and published in both those Languages.

The Court found that these requirements apply to all legislation and regulations. On this basis, it found the restrictions placed upon English in Chapter III of Title I of the Charter of the French Language to be ultra vires the Legislative Assembly of Quebec.

The interpretation given by the Court to language rights was expansive in four respects:

1. Both the English and French versions of a law have official status, or else the law cannot be said to have been “enacted” in both language;

2. All subordinate legislation, including regulations, are regarded as being “laws”, and thus the versions in both languages have official status;

3. The rights of all persons to use either official language in court applies to artificial persons such as corporations;

4. “Courts of Quebec” was interpreted to include administrative tribunals and panels, in addition to ordinary courts.

Chapter III of Title I of the Charter of the French Language, entitled "The Language of the Legislature and of the Courts", reads as follows:

7. French is the language of the legislature and the courts in Quebec.

8. Legislative bills shall be drafted in the official language. They shall also be tabled in the Assemblée nationale, passed and assented to in that language.

9. Only the French text of the statutes and regulations is official.

10. An English version of every legislative bill, statute and regulation shall be printed and published by the civil administration.

11. Artificial persons addressing themselves to the courts and to bodies discharging judicial or quasi-judicial functions shall do so in the official language, and shall use the official language in pleading before them unless all the parties to the action agree to their pleading in English.

12. Procedural documents issued by bodies discharging judicial or quasi-judicial functions or drawn up and sent by the advocates practising before them shall be drawn up in the official language. Such documents may, however, be drawn up in another language if the natural person for whose intention they are issued expressly consents thereto.

13. The judgments rendered in Quebec by the courts and by bodies discharging judicial or quasi-judicial functions must be drawn up in French or be accompanied with a duly authenticated French version. Only the French version of the judgment is official.

The Court provided the following explanation for finding the restrictions on English in these provisions to be unconstitutional:

It was urged before this Court [by counsel for the Quebec government] that there is no requirement [under section 133] of enactment in both languages, as contrasted with printing and publishing. However, if full weight is given to every word of s. 133 it becomes apparent that this requirement is implicit. What is required to be printed and published in both languages is described as "Acts" and texts do not become "Acts" without enactment. Statutes can only be known by being printed and published in connection with their enactment so that Bills can be transformed into Acts. Moreover, it would be strange to have a requirement, as in s. 133, that both English and French "shall be used in the ... Records and Journals of the [Legislative Assembly of Quebec] and not to have this requirement extend to the enactment of legislation.

== Aftermath ==
Upon receiving the judgment the government of Quebec applied for a rehearing in order to get clarification on whether there were any exemptions from section 133. The policy purpose of the application was to allow the provincial government to restrict the scope of English-language services as much as possible, without violating section 133. Two years later the Court handed down its decision in Quebec (Attorney General) v. Blaikie (No. 2) (1981), clarifying that municipal governments, which are creatures of the provincial government, are nonetheless not constitutionally obliged to conduct their proceedings or to produce bylaws in both languages.

== See also ==
- List of Supreme Court of Canada cases (Laskin Court)
- Reference Re Manitoba Language Rights
