= Smithers v R =

Smithers v. The Queen
- Supreme Court of Canada

Hearing: February 10, 11, 1977 Judgment: May 17, 1977
- Full case name: Paul Douglas Smithers v. Her Majesty The Queen
- Citations: [1978] 1 S.C.R. 506
- Ruling: Appeal dismissed.

Holding
- The actions of the accused must have been a contributing cause of death outside of the de minimis range to be convicted of manslaughter.

Court membership
- Chief Justice: Bora Laskin; Puisne Justices: Ronald Martland, Roland Ritchie, Wishart Spence, Louis-Philippe Pigeon, Brian Dickson, Jean Beetz, Willard Estey, Yves Pratte

Reasons given
- Unanimous reasons by: Dickson J.

Smithers v. R., [1978] 1 S.C.R. 506 is a leading Supreme Court of Canada decision on determining criminal causation in an offence of manslaughter. The Court held that the Crown must show that the accused's acts were a "contributing cause of death outside of the de minimis range." In practice, this test applied to all criminal offences requiring proof of causation.

== Background ==
On February 18, 1973, Smithers, a black teen, played in a hockey game against a team including Barrie Cobby, a white teen, in a Mississauga rink. During the game, Smithers was subject to numerous racial slurs by Cobby. Evidence given by numerous witnesses at the trial indicated both had a dislike for each other's behaviour and Cobby had often been using racial slurs toward Smithers. During their final game, Cobby was given a penalty for spearing Smithers during the game while Cobby was in the penalty box Smithers scored a goal and laughed in Cobby's direction. Cobby shouted further racial slurs and Smithers threatened Cobby that he was going to "get him" if Cobby did not apologize for making the ongoing racial insults.

After the game Smithers waited outside the rink for Cobby to leave. When Cobby came out Smithers chased him and was grabbed by at least 3 of Cobby's friends, Smithers grabbed Cobby's jacket and kicked Cobby once in the stomach area. Immediately Cobby fell to the ground and started to gasp for air. Cobby soon passed out and died shortly afterwards. It was discovered that he died from inhaling vomit after being kicked due to a rare condition in which his epiglottis failed. Although Smithers was unsure if the kick even landed (there were no marks on Cobby), he was still responsible.

Smithers was charged for manslaughter under section 205 of the Criminal Code (now section 222) for "caus[ing] the death of a human being". In his defence, Smithers argued that it was the epiglottis condition that caused death, not the blow.

The issue before the Supreme Court was whether the kick was a sufficient cause of the death to attract criminal liability.

A unanimous Court held that Smithers was guilty of causing death of a human being. The decision was written by Justice Dickson.

== Opinion of the court ==
Dickson adopted the comments of G. Arthur Martin from a 1943 case note on the English Larkin case, where it was stated that "[t]here are many unlawful acts which are not dangerous in themselves and are not likely to cause injury which, nevertheless if they cause death, render the actor guilty of culpable homicide ... In the case of so-called intentional crimes where death is an unintended consequence the actor is always guilty of manslaughter at least."

The question Dickson considered was what degree of causation is required to prove guilt. Where consequences need not be intended such as manslaughter, he proposed the degree of contribution to the cause of death need only pass a de minimis test. That is, the Crown need only show that the amount contributed to the cause of death be more than trivial.

Dickson also reaffirmed the application of the thin skull doctrine in homicide, where the fact that Cobby was susceptible to failure of the epiglottis should not absolve Smithers from liability. Consequently, since the kick may have killed Cobby, its contribution to his death was more than trivial and so Smithers is criminally liable.

== See also ==
- List of Supreme Court of Canada cases (Laskin Court)
