= Vetrovec v R =

- Supreme Court of Canada

Hearing: 20 May 1981 Judgment: 31 May 1982
- Full case name: Joseph Vetrovec v Her Majesty The Queen
- Citations: [1982] 1 SCR 811
- Prior history: APPEAL from R v Vetrovec, 1980 CanLII 310 (10 November 1980)
- Ruling: Appeal dismissed

Court membership
- Chief Justice: Bora Laskin; Puisne Justices: Ronald Martland, Roland Ritchie, Brian Dickson, Jean Beetz, Willard Estey, William McIntyre, Julien Chouinard, Antonio Lamer

Reasons given
- Unanimous reasons by: Dickson J

Vetrovec v R [1982] 1 SCR 811 is a leading Canadian decision on the testimony evidence of accomplices. The case birthed the Vetrovec warning, which gives judges the discretion to warn the jury of the risks of accepting the testimony of untrustworthy witnesses.
