= Cherneskey v Armadale Publishers Ltd =

- Supreme Court of Canada

Hearing: 12–13 December 1977 Judgment: 21 November 1978
- Full case name: Morris T Cherneskey v Armadale Publishers Limited and Sterling King
- Citations: [1979] 1 SCR 1067
- Prior history: APPEAL from Cherneskey v Armadale Publishers Ltd, 1974 CanLII 984 (26 July 1974)
- Ruling: Appeal allowed and trial judgment restored

Court membership
- Chief Justice: Bora Laskin; Puisne Justices: Ronald Martland, Roland Ritchie, Wishart Spence, Louis-Philippe Pigeon, Brian Dickson, Jean Beetz, Willard Estey, Yves Pratte

Reasons given
- Majority: Martland J, joined by Laskin CJ and Ritchie, Pigeon, Beetz and Pratte JJ
- Dissent: Dickson J, joined by Spence and Estey JJ

Cherneskey v Armadale Publishers Ltd, [1979] 1 SCR 1067 is a leading decision by the Supreme Court of Canada on the use of a defence of fair comment against an action for libel.

An action for libel was brought by a Morris Cherneskey, an alderman for Saskatoon City Council, against the local Star-Phoenix newspaper for publishing a letter written by two law students criticizing Cherneskey for supporting the creation of an Alcoholic Rehabilitation Centre in a residential section of Saskatoon.

In a six to three decision the Court held that a defence of fair comment is not possible when the editors themselves did not agree with the opinion of the letter and when there was no evidence that the authors of the letter submitted the letter in good faith. The Court stated that:

The freedom of the journalist is an ordinary part of the freedom of the subject, and to whatever lengths the subject in general may go, so also may the journalist, but, apart from statute law, his privilege is no other and no higher. The responsibilities which attach to his power in the dissemination of printed matter may, and in the case of a conscientious journalist do, make him more careful; but the range of his assertions, his criticisms, or his comments is as wide as, and no wider than, that of any other subject. No privilege attaches to his position.

Chief Justice Brian Dickson wrote the dissenting opinion.
