= Amax Potash Ltd v Saskatchewan =

- Supreme Court of Canada

Hearing: June 10, 1976 Judgment: October 5, 1976
- Full case name: Amax Potash Limited, International Minerals and Chemical Corporation (Canada) Limited, Duval Corporation of Canada, Cominco Ltd., United States Borax & Chemical Corporation, Hudson Bay Mining and Smelting Co., Limited, Swift Canadian Co., Limited, PPG Industries Canada Ltd., Alwinsal Potash of Canada Limited, Ideal Basic Industries, Inc., and Texasgulf Potash Company v. The Government of Saskatchewan
- Citations: [1977] 2 S.C.R. 576
- Prior history: Judgment for the Government of Saskatchewan in the Court of Appeal for Saskatchewan.
- Ruling: Appeal allowed.

Holding
- The government cannot enact legislation that protects the government from liability due to enacting legislation that was outside of its constitutional authority.

Court membership
- Chief Justice: Bora Laskin; Puisne Justices: Ronald Martland, Wilfred Judson, Roland Ritchie, Wishart Spence, Louis-Philippe Pigeon, Brian Dickson, Jean Beetz, Louis-Philippe de Grandpré

Reasons given
- Unanimous reasons by: Dickson J.

Amax Potash Ltd v Saskatchewan [1977] 2 S.C.R. 576 is a leading case of the Supreme Court of Canada on the application and role of the Constitution of Canada.

== Background ==
During the 1970s, one of Saskatchewan's biggest industry was potash mining. Much of it was run by American mining companies that would export it to the US. The recently elected New Democratic Party (NDP) provincial government of Allan Blakeney enacted the Mineral Taxation Act and the Potash Reserve Regulations that effectively taxed the companies for their mining.

The mining companies sought to reclaim the tax that they had paid over the years. They made a Constitutional challenge against the Act on the grounds that the taxes were ultra vires the authority of the provincial government as taxation of this type was a matter for the federal government.

The provincial government sought refuge under section 5(7) of the Saskatchewan Proceedings Against the Crown Act, which barred recovery in just such an event. It stated that "the province's liability is limited in respect of things done or omitted in the exercise of power or authority under an ultra vires enactment".

The issue before the Court was whether the immunity clause, exempting itself from paying back money gained through invalid law, was valid law.

== Opinion of the Court ==
The Court found in favour of the mining companies. The government was attempting to circumvent section 52 of the Constitution by exempting itself from federalism.

In his reasoning, Dickson J. (as he was then) stated:

To allow moneys collected under compulsion, pursuant to an ultra vires statute, to be retained would be tantamount to allowing the provincial Legislature to do indirectly what it could not do directly, and by covert means to impose illegal burdens.

He concluded by stating:

The principle governing this appeal can be shortly and simply expressed in these terms: if a statute is found to be ultra vires the legislature which enacted it, legislation which would have the effect of attaching legal consequences to acts done pursuant to that invalid law must equally be ultra vires because it relates to the same subject-matter as that which was involved in the prior legislation. If a state cannot take by unconstitutional means it cannot retain by unconstitutional means.

== Aftermath ==
Upon losing the case, Premier Blakeney met with the mining companies and threatened that the provincial government would take over the potash mining industry. Eventually, however, the companies and the government came to an agreement under which the government paid back only part of the taxes.

== See also ==
- List of Supreme Court of Canada cases (Laskin Court)
