= Reibl v Hughes =

- Supreme Court of Canada

Hearing: June 5, 1980 Judgment: October 7, 1980
- Full case name: John Reibl v Robert A. Hughes
- Citations: [1980] 2 SCR 880

Holding
- In order to obtain medical consent, physicians must provide the patient with enough information so that an objective, reasonable person in the patient's position could make an informed decision.

Court membership
- Chief Justice: Bora Laskin; Puisne Justices: Ronald Martland, Roland Ritchie, Brian Dickson, Jean Beetz, Willard Estey, William McIntyre, Julien Chouinard, Antonio Lamer

Reasons given
- Unanimous reasons by: The Court
- Ritchie and Estey JJ. took no part in the consideration or decision of the case.

Reibl v Hughes [1980] 2 S.C.R. 880 is a leading decision of the Supreme Court of Canada on negligence, medical malpractice, informed consent, the duty to warn, and causation.

The case settled the issue of when a physician may be sued for battery and when it is more appropriate to sue the doctor in negligence. The Court wrote unanimously that "unless there has been misrepresentation or fraud to secure consent to the treatment, a failure to disclose the attendant risks, however serious, should go to negligence rather than to battery." The case also marked the creation of a standard whereby a physician must give the patient sufficient information so that an objective, reasonable person in the patient's position would be able to make an informed choice about a medical procedure.

== Background ==
Robert A. Hughes, a physician, was in the process of competently performing an endarterectomy on his patient, John Reibl, when Reibl suffered a massive stroke. Paralysis and impotence resulted. Reibl alleged that he had not truly given informed consent, and as such the surgery constituted battery. Although Reibl was aware that the surgery was not without risks, he felt that Hughes had implied that the risks of not having the surgery were greater. Reibl was eighteen months away from obtaining a lifetime pension, and the stroke prevented him from earning that pension. He stated that if he had been aware of the risks in the surgery, he would have waited the year and a half to earn his pension before undergoing the procedure, even if it meant a shortened life.

In the original trial, Reibl was awarded monetary damages for negligence and battery, irrespective of his having signed a formal consent form. On appeal to the Ontario Court of Appeal, the court directed that a new trial be held, but that the charge of battery be disallowed from the new proceedings.

== Ruling ==
It is a general principle in tort law that a defendant is not liable for damages unless their negligence was the cause of the injury to the plaintiff.

In the context of a medical malpractice claim where it is alleged the doctor failed to inform the patient of a risk, the doctor will not be held liable if the patient would have had the procedure anyway (even if they knew of the risk).

Reibl v. Hughes the Supreme Court outlined a "modified objective test" for causation in medical malpractice. It is well established in Canadian law that a doctor cannot be sued for not disclosing information if the patient would have consented to the operation irrespective of whether or not the information was disclosed.

Consider this example: your doctor knows that a surgery has a 5% chance of causing complete paralysis but does not tell you. Without the operation, however, you will very likely die within 12 months.

The court looked at two approaches: an objective test ("what would a reasonable person do?") and a subjective ("what would this plaintiff have done?"). There was concern that an objective test favors the doctor while a subjective test favors the plaintiff.

In an objective test, the Court would accept medical evidence that the chance of paralysis was 5% and the chance of death was high. A reasonable person, thinking rationally, would take the risk of paralysis over death.

If it were a subjective test, the Court would ask the plaintiff. Logically, the plaintiff, who is paralysed will say "no." Logically, if the plaintiff said they would have had the operation anyway, they would not be suing the doctor.

In Reibl, The Court created a "modified objective test" which starts with the "reasonable person" and adds some of the characteristics of the plaintiff, such as age, sex, and family circumstances but will not allow "irrational beliefs" to be taken into account.

The test has been frequently used to determine many medical malpractice and negligence cases, including Arndt v. Smith.
