= R v Saskatchewan Wheat Pool =

- Supreme Court of Canada

Hearing: February 17, 1982 Judgment: February 8, 1983
- Full case name: Her Majesty The Queen in the Right of Canada v Saskatchewan Wheat Pool
- Citations: [1983] 1 S.C.R. 205
- Ruling: The Board's appeal was dismissed.

Court membership
- Chief Justice: Bora Laskin; Puisne Justices: Roland Ritchie, Brian Dickson, Jean Beetz, Willard Estey, William McIntyre, Julien Chouinard, Antonio Lamer, Bertha Wilson

Reasons given
- Unanimous reasons by: Dickson J.
- Laskin C.J. and Wilson J. took no part in the consideration or decision of the case.

R v Saskatchewan Wheat Pool, [1983] 1 S.C.R. 205 is a leading case of the Supreme Court of Canada on tort law. The Court rejected the tort of breach of statutory duty. The courts should only use breaches of a statute as evidence towards an established tort and should not be trying to determine whether the legislature intended to allow a private right of action.

== Background ==
The Saskatchewan Wheat Pool delivered a shipment of infested wheat from one of its terminal elevators to the Canadian Wheat Board, which violated section 86(c) of the Canada Grain Act. The Board sought to recover damages for the statutory violation.

At trial, the Federal Court of Canada held in favour of the Board but was reversed on appeal to the Federal Court of Appeal.

The issue before the Supreme Court was whether the breach of the Act gave the Board a private right of action.

== Decision of the Court ==
Justice Dickson, for a unanimous Court, dismissed the appeal of the Board and held that there was no private right of action. Dickson examined the tort of breach of statutory duty in both England and the United States. He concluded that damages for breach of statutory duty should be subsumed by the law of negligence. He further rejected any novel right of action for damages for breach of statute and instead stated that the breach can be used as evidence of negligence and as evidence of a standard of care.
