= Canada (Labour Relations Board) v Paul L'Anglais Inc. et al. =

Canada (Labour Relations Board) v Paul L'Anglais Inc
- Supreme Court of Canada

Hearing: 25 and 26 October 1982 Judgment: 8 February 1983
- Full case name: The Canada Labour Relations Board and the Attorney General of Canada v. Paul L'Anglais Inc. and J.P.L. Productions Inc.; The Canadian Union of Public Employees v. Paul L'Anglais Inc. and J.P.L. Productions Inc.
- Citations: 1983 1 S.C.R. 147(LEXUM)
- Docket No.: 16384
- Prior history: Judgments for Paul L'Anglais Inc. and J.P.L. Productions Inc. in the Court of Appeal for Quebec
- Ruling: Appeals court decision upheld

Holding
- Parliament does not have the power remove a superior court's jurisdiction to interpret and apply the constitution.

Court membership
- Chief Justice: Bora Laskin; Puisne Justices: Roland Ritchie, Brian Dickson, Jean Beetz, Willard Estey, William McIntyre, Julien Chouinard, Antonio Lamer, Bertha Wilson

Reasons given
- Unanimous reasons by: Chouinard
- Laskin and Richie took no part in the consideration or decision of the case.

Canada (Labour Relations Board) v Paul L'Anglais Inc. et al. [1983] 1 S.C.R. 147 is a leading Supreme Court of Canada constitutional decision on the jurisdiction of the superior courts to hear constitutional arguments. The unanimous court found that courts of inherent jurisdiction such as the Quebec Superior Court had concurrent jurisdiction to hear constitutional cases.

== Background ==
A series of multimedia companies were involved in the production of several television shows and sold air time to sponsors. The Canadian Union of Public Employees (CUPE) brought a claim against the companies to the Canada Industrial Relations Board (CIRB). CUPE applied to have the companies declared a single party for the purposes of a collective bargaining proceedings. The companies argued that it was impossible as some of them were not inter-provincial companies and thus were outside of federal jurisdiction.

The CIRB found that the companies were within federal jurisdiction, and subsequently granted CUPE's application. The companies, in turn, applied to the Quebec Superior Court for a writ of evocation against the CIRB. The Superior Court denied the application on grounds that they did not have jurisdiction, holding that the Federal Court Act gave the power to hear this sort of case to the Federal Court. On appeal to the Quebec Court of Appeal, the court held that the Superior Court had jurisdiction and granted the writ of evocation.

The issue before the Supreme Court was whether the Superior Court had jurisdiction over constitutional issues.

== Opinion of the court ==
The unanimous court upheld the decision of the Quebec Court of Appeal. The opinion was given by Justice Julien Chouinard.

The court acknowledged the fact that the Federal Court Act gave jurisdiction to the federal courts on matters of federal agencies. However, the act "does not apply to supersede the superintending and reforming power of the Superior Court". The federal government can create a court "for the better administration of the laws of Canada" as per section 101 of the Constitution Act, 1867. Such a court may be given exclusive power over the application of federal laws. However, section 101 does not grant the federal government authority to remove the power of superior courts to determine the constitutionality of federal laws. The government can only create concurrent jurisdiction rather than exclusive jurisdiction.

In the end the court held that the companies were not engaged in matters within the federal powers by creating TV programming and so the CLRB did not have jurisdiction over the dispute. Instead the superior courts had jurisdiction. The court affirmed the Court of Appeal's granting of the writ.

== Aftermath ==
The case largely established concurrent jurisdiction between statutory courts and courts of inherent jurisdiction. However, in later decisions such the jurisdiction trilogy of Cuddy Chicks Ltd. v. Ontario, the Douglas College case, and the Tétreault-Gadoury case have seemingly reversed the ruling with little mention of the case itself.
