= Rio Hotel Ltd v New Brunswick (Liquor Licensing Board) =

- Supreme Court of Canada

Hearing: 6 October 1986 Judgment: 29 July 1987
- Full case name: Rio Hotel Limited v. Liquor Licensing Board, established pursuant to the Liquor Control Act
- Citations: [1987] 2 S.C.R. 59
- Docket No.: 19949
- Ruling: Ruling in favour of Board

Holding
- A provincial licensing scheme may be valid even where overlap with federal matters.

Court membership
- Chief Justice: Brian Dickson; Puisne Justices: Jean Beetz, Willard Estey, William McIntyre, Julien Chouinard, Antonio Lamer, Bertha Wilson, Gerald Le Dain, Gérard La Forest

Reasons given
- Majority: Dickson (McIntyre, Wilson and Le Dain concurring)
- Concurrence: Estey (Lamer concurring)
- Concurrence: Beetz
- Chouinard and La Forest took no part in the consideration or decision of the case.

Rio Hotel Ltd v New Brunswick (Liquor Licensing Board) [1987] 2 S.C.R. 59 is a Supreme Court of Canada decision on the Constitution's criminal law power. The Court held that, despite overlapping with valid federal law, the provincial law that restricted the amount of nudity in bars was constitutionally valid.

== Background ==
The New Brunswick Liquor Control Act required that all liquor licences be accompanied by an entertainment licence that limited the degree of nudity allowed within the establishment. Rio Hotel decided to challenge the constitutionality of the law on the grounds that it related to public morality which is a matter of federal criminal law.

The issue before the Supreme Court was whether "a provincial prohibition of nude entertainment attached to a liquor licensing scheme operates notwithstanding the more general but related prohibitions contained in the Code". The unanimous Court held that it did.

== Reasons of the court ==
Chief Justice Dickson, writing for McIntyre, Wilson, and Le Dain, held that the law was valid. Dickson characterized the law as regulating entertainment as a means to boost alcohol sales. Presumptively this matter is both of a local nature and relating to property and civil rights. Though there are provisions within the Criminal Code dealing with nudity, they do not conflict with the provincial law.

Furthermore, the law did not possess any penal consequences required for all valid criminal law.

== See also ==
- List of Supreme Court of Canada cases (Dickson Court)
