= R v Sault Ste-Marie (City of) =

- Supreme Court of Canada

Hearing: October 13, 14, 1977 Judgment: May 1, 1978
- Full case name: City of Sault Ste. Marie v. Her Majesty The Queen
- Citations: [1978] 2 SCR 1299

Court membership
- Chief Justice: Bora Laskin; Puisne Justices: Ronald Martland, Roland Ritchie, Wishart Spence, Louis-Philippe Pigeon, Brian Dickson, Jean Beetz, Willard Estey, Yves Pratte

Reasons given
- Unanimous reasons by: Dickson J

R v Sault Ste-Marie (City of) [1978] 2 SCR 1299 is a Supreme Court of Canada case where the Court defines the three types of offences that exist in Canadian law and further defines the justification for "public welfare" offences.

== Background ==
The city of Sault Ste. Marie, Ontario, hired Cherokee Disposal to dispose of the city's waste. The city built a disposal site 20 feet from a stream which, when filled by the disposal company, resulted in waste seeping into the stream. The city was charged with discharging, or permitting to be discharged, refuse into the public waterways causing pollution pursuant to section 32(1) of the Ontario Water Resources Act.

The issue before the court was whether the city's offence should be classified as strict liability or absolute liability. The Court of Appeal for Ontario held that the charge required proof of mens rea, which on the facts would acquit the defendant.

== Reasoning ==
In the judgement written by Justice Dickson, the Court recognized three categories of offences:

1. True Crimes: Offences that require some state of mind (mens rea) as an element of the crime. These offences are usually implied by the use of language within the charge such as "knowingly", "willfully", or "intentionally".
2. Strict Liability: Offences that do not require the proof of mens rea. The act alone is punishable. The duty is on the accused to have acted as a reasonable person and has a defence of reasonable mistake of fact (a due diligence defence). The Court stated that the due diligence defence "will be available if the accused reasonably believed in a mistaken set of facts which, if true, would render the act or omission innocent, or if he took all reasonable steps to avoid the particular event. These offences may properly be called offences of strict liability." The reason for this is that the Court described a need for a class of offence that had a lower standard to convict than True Crimes but was not as harsh as Absolute Liability offences. As opposed to the first category of offences in which the accused is presumed innocent, offences of strict liability presses a presumption of negligence on the accused. The burden of proving that the accused acted as a diligent person rests on his shoulders and must be demonstrated by preponderance of evidence.
3. Absolute Liability: Similar to Strict Liability, these offences do not require proof of mens rea either. However, the accused has no defences available.

To distinguish between these types the Court examines:

[t]he overall regulatory pattern adopted by the legislature, the subject matter of the legislation, the importance of the penalty and the precision of the language used will be primary considerations in determining whether the offence falls into the third category.

The Court then noted that the dumping offences were of a public welfare nature and were from a provincial statute, thus, were Strict Liability offences and do not require mens rea.

== See also ==
- Absolute liability
- Re BC Motor Vehicle Act, (1985), examined absolute liability in light of the Charter of Rights and Freedoms.
- R v Wholesale Travel Group Inc (1991)
- Strict liability (criminal)
