= Nova Scotia (Board of Censors) v McNeil =

- Supreme Court of Canada

Hearing: May 24, 25, 1977 Judgment: January 19, 1978
- Full case name: The Nova Scotia Board of Censors and The Attorney General in and for the Province of Nova Scotia v Gerard McNeil
- Citations: [1978] 2 S.C.R. 662
- Ruling: Held in favour of board.

Holding
- Laws regarding local moral standards are in the provincial jurisdiction.

Court membership
- Chief Justice: Bora Laskin; Puisne Justices: Ronald Martland, Roland Ritchie, Wishart Spence, Louis-Philippe Pigeon, Brian Dickson, Jean Beetz, Willard Estey, Yves Pratte

Reasons given
- Majority: Ritchie J., joined by Martland, Pigeon, Beetz and de Grandpré JJ.
- Dissent: Laskin C.J., joined by Judson, Spence and Dickson JJ.

Nova Scotia (Board of Censors) v McNeil, [1978] 2 S.C.R. 662 is a famous pre-Charter decision from the Supreme Court of Canada on freedom of expression and the criminal law power under the Constitution Act, 1867. The film censorship laws of the province of Nova Scotia were challenged on the basis that it constituted criminal law which could only be legislated by the federal government. The Court held that though the censorship laws had a moral dimension to it, the laws did not have any prohibition or penalty required in a criminal law.

== Background ==
The Amusement Regulation Board of Nova Scotia, created under the Theatre and Amusement Act, banned the film Last Tango in Paris from being shown in the province. McNeil, a journalist, attempted to challenge the law on the basis that it was a constitutionally invalid law.

The issue before the Supreme Court was whether the regulation of morality alone constitutes a criminal law. In a five to four decision the Court held that the law was concerning property and civil rights under section 92(13) of the B.N.A. Act and not criminal law.

== Reasons of the court ==
Ritchie J., writing for the majority found that the pith and substance of the Act concerned the "regulation, supervision and control" of film, a form of private property, in the province. Consequently, the law was strictly a matter of Property and Civil Rights, a matter that was in the exclusive jurisdiction of the province. Further, Ritchie applied the definition of Criminal law from the Margarine Reference case which required that a criminal law must concern the public interest and must consist of a prohibition with a penalty. Ritchie found that there was no clear prohibition because the law did not provide details on what was prohibited, rather, it left it to the discretion of the board.

== Dissent ==
Laskin CJ., in dissent, found that the law had no connection with Property and Civil Rights. Laskin identified the law as colourable. In form it concerned property but in substance it concerned the regulation of "taste". He noted how the province had already unsuccessfully attempted to prosecute the distributor of the film under the obscenity laws of the Criminal Code, and saw this as another attempt at the same goal.

== See also ==
- List of Supreme Court of Canada cases (Laskin Court)
