= Scowby v Glendinning =

- Supreme Court of Canada

Hearing: February 19, 1985 Judgment: October 9, 1986
- Citations: [1986] 2 S.C.R. 226
- Docket No.: 17739
- Ruling: Appeal allowed

Court membership
- Chief Justice: Brian Dickson; Puisne Justices: Jean Beetz, Willard Estey, William McIntyre, Julien Chouinard, Antonio Lamer, Bertha Wilson, Gerald Le Dain, Gérard La Forest

Reasons given
- Majority: Estey J. (paras. 1-19), joined by Beetz, Chouinard, Lamer and Le Dain JJ.
- Dissent: LaForest J. (paras. 20-85), joined by Dickson C.J. and Wilson J.

Scowby v Glendinning, [1986] 2 S.C.R. 226 is a leading federalism decision of the Supreme Court of Canada. The Saskatchewan provincial Human Rights Act was found not to apply to potentially discriminatory conduct that was acted as part of criminal law enforcement.

== Background ==
Frederick Runns and a number of his friends were arrested by the Royal Canadian Mounted Police in his hunting cabin for the assault of a conservation officer. The suspects were made to lay on the ground without being dressed in sub-zero temperature for approximately half an hour. They were eventually released.

Runns and his associates made a complaint to the Saskatchewan Human Rights Commission for arbitrary arrest. A Board of Inquiry was established to investigate the matter. The issue was whether the provincial Board of Inquiry had jurisdiction to investigate into the conduct of the officers.

The issues on appeal to the Supreme Court were:

1. whether section 7 the Saskatchewan Human Rights Code, which allows the investigation of cases of arbitrary arrest or detention, is inoperative under section 96 of the Constitution Act, 1867.
2. Whether the Board of Inquiry is able to adjudicate complaints of the RCMP officers.

== Opinion of the Court ==
Justice Estey, writing for the majority, allowed the appeal. Estey found that section 7 of Code is inoperative as it concerns matters of criminal law, which is in the exclusive jurisdiction of the federal government. As such, he did not need to consider the effects of section 96 of the Constitution Act, 1867.

Justice Laforest, in dissent, argued that police conduct could fall within the province's property and civil rights power under section 92(13) or likewise within the province's authority over the "administration of justice in the province" under section 92(14).

== See also ==
- List of Supreme Court of Canada cases
