= Miller v R =

Judgement of the Supreme Court of Canada

Miller et al. v. The Queen
- Supreme Court of Canada

Hearing: June 22, 1976 Judgment: October 5, 1976
- Full case name: John Harvey Miller and Vincent John Roger Cockriell Appellants; and Her Majesty The Queen Respondent.
- Citations: Miller et al. v. The Queen, 1976 CanLII 12 (SCC), [1977] 2 SCR 680, <https://canlii.ca/t/1mx57>, retrieved on 2022-06-12

Court membership
- Chief Justice: Bora Laskin; Puisne Justices: Ronald Martland, Wilfred Judson, Roland Ritchie, Wishart Spence, Louis-Philippe Pigeon, Brian Dickson, Jean Beetz, Louis-Philippe de Grandpré

Reasons given

Miller v R [1977] 2 SCR 680 is a Canadian Bill of Rights decision of the Supreme Court of Canada where the Criminal Code provisions relating to the death penalty were challenged as a violation of the right against "cruel and unusual" punishment under section 2(b) of the Bill of Rights.

Justice Laskin, for the majority, upheld the laws. He interpreted the phrase "cruel and unusual" in the context of its origin in the English Bill of Rights and the US Eighth Amendment, which only limited the means of carrying out a death sentence.

Some of the definition given to cruel and unusual punishments in this case later shaped the jurisprudence carried out under section 12 of the Canadian Charter of Rights and Freedoms.

== See also ==
- List of Supreme Court of Canada cases
