= Section 92(14) of the Constitution Act, 1867 =

Portion of the primary constitutional document of Canada

Section 92(14) of the Constitution Act, 1867, also known as the administration of justice power, grants the provincial legislatures of Canada the authority to legislate on:

14. The Administration of Justice in the Province, including the Constitution, Maintenance, and Organization of Provincial Courts, both of Civil and of Criminal Jurisdiction, and including Procedure in Civil Matters in those Courts.

It has been considered to be one of the major sources of conflict concerning the interpretation of the Constitution of Canada.

== Nature and extent of jurisdiction ==
=== Basic nature ===
The Constitution Act, 1867 divides the responsibility between the federal and provincial jurisdictions. Together with the grant under s. 92(14), s. 91(27) carves out "Procedure in Criminal Matters," while s. 96 requires the appointment of "the Judges of the Superior, District, and County Courts in each Province" to be done by the Governor General in Council, and s. 101 grants the Parliament of Canada the power to provide "for the Establishment of any additional Courts for the better Administration of the Laws of Canada." (Note: Under which the Federal Court, the Tax Court of Canada and the Federal Court of Appeal have been created.)

Within the Canadian constitutional context, it has been held that provincial jurisdiction includes matters concerning law enforcement (including the appointment, control and discipline of police officers), the establishment of facilities necessary for the enforcement of criminal law, and public inquiries on how the power is executed.

=== Interface with the federal criminal law power ===
In R v Wetmore, Dickson J (as he then was) observed:

There is ... a special relationship between s. 92(14) and s. 91(27), a relationship that cannot be said to obtain between s. 92(14) and the other heads of power in s. 91. Sections 91(27) and 92(14) together effect a careful and delicate division of power between the two levels of government in the field of criminal justice.... The singling out and the express conferral on the provinces under s. 92(14) of responsibility to constitute, maintain and organize courts for the administration of one particular area of federal law, namely, criminal law, is unique.

In that regard, "investigation must be in accordance with federally prescribed criminal procedure and not otherwise." Therefore, police officers are able to enforce the Criminal Code because they are designated as peace officers under it. As well, Canadian National Transportation and Wetmore have held that prosecution falls within criminal procedure, and that it can be pursued by either federal or provincial prosecutors. In a similar fashion, a Quebec measure that diverted young people from the criminal justice system was held to be unconstitutional, as it conflicted with the Juvenile Delinquents Act. (Note: Juvenile Delinquents Act, R.S.C. 1970, c. J-3, since replaced by the Youth Criminal Justice Act.)

There is no bright line test as to what falls within the area of criminal procedure, as Dickson J conceded in Di Iorio v Warden of the Montreal Jail:

The phrase "criminal procedure" does not lend itself to precise definition. In one sense, it is concerned with proceedings in the criminal courts and such matters as conduct within the courtroom, the competency of witnesses, oaths and affirmations, and the presentation of evidence. Some cases have defined procedure even more narrowly in finding that it embraces the three technical terms—pleading, evidence and practice. In a broad sense, it encompasses such things as the rules by which, according to the Criminal Code, police powers are exercised, the right to counsel, search warrants, interim release, procuring attendance of witnesses.

...

It is not necessary and perhaps impossible, to find a satisfactory definition of "criminal procedure." Although I would reject the view which would confine criminal procedure to that which takes place within the courtroom on a prosecution, I am equally of the opinion that "criminal procedure" is not co-extensive with "criminal justice" or that the phrase "criminal procedure" as used in the B.N.A. Act can drain from the words "administration of justice" in s. 92(14) that which gives those words much of their substance—the element of "criminal justice."

In R v Hauser, Spence J later gave a more succinct explanation:

Criminal procedure, ... in its broadest sense, comprehends the mode of proceeding by which those rights and obligations are enforced. In a more narrow sense “procedure” means the machinery of the Court by which the formal steps in a judicial proceeding are regulated.

Therefore, federal jurisdiction applies to how investigations and prosecutions may proceed, but not whether or when to conduct them.

=== Interface with other federal powers ===
The Parliament of Canada can confer "new duties upon the existing Provincial Courts, or to give them new powers, as to matters which do not come within the classes of subjects assigned exclusively to the Legislatures of the Provinces." By extension, measures such as the trial of federal election petitions and insolvency proceedings (Note: Under the Bankruptcy and Insolvency Act, the Companies' Creditors Arrangement Act or the Winding-Up and Restructuring Act.) will fall outside the scope of s. 92(14).

=== Dispute resolution by administrative bodies ===
Because of s. 96, the provinces are restricted in how they can remove disputes from the jurisdiction of the courts. However, such jurisdiction has been held not to be "fixed forever as it stood at the date of Confederation," and a key question to be asked is whether an adjudication is to take place "between Crown and subject or between subject and subject." A negative answer would stand in favour of an administrative body's ability to act.

Under the Residential Tenancies case, a three-part test has been devised to determine whether unconstitutional encroachment has occurred:

1. consideration, in the light of the historical conditions existing in 1867, of the particular power or jurisdiction conferred upon the tribunal;
2. consideration of the function within its institutional setting to determine whether the function itself is different when viewed in that setting; and
3. if the power or jurisdiction is exercised in a judicial manner, then it becomes necessary to review the tribunal's function as a whole in order to appraise the impugned function in its entire institutional context.

If, after such review, the adjudication powers are determined to be "merely subsidiary or ancillary to general administrative functions assigned to the tribunal," or "necessarily incidental to the achievement of a broader policy goal of the legislature," then such powers are constitutionally valid.

=== Conflict with the federal courts ===
The Federal Courts Act grants the Federal Court concurrent jurisdiction with the provincial courts in various matters concerning federal law, together with exclusive original jurisdiction for:

1. issues which "the Crown and any person" have agreed in writing to submit to the Federal Court;
2. applications for relief against "any federal board, commission or other tribunal" (including any proceeding brought against the Attorney General of Canada);
3. applications for writs "in relation to any member of the Canadian Forces serving outside Canada;"
4. applications for judicial review concerning "a decision or an order of a federal board, commission or other tribunal;"
5. where the Legislative Assembly of a province has passed assenting legislation, controversies between Canada and a province, or between a province and any other province that has passed similar legislation;
6. issues concerning applications or registrations of intellectual property;
7. reliefs or remedies not available through any other court; and
8. any matter, "not allocated specifically to the Federal Court of Appeal," in which an Act of the Parliament of Canada has granted jurisdiction.

Even within such matters of exclusive jurisdiction, it has been held that provincial courts are not prevented from ruling on the constitutionality of federal laws, as:

Any jurisdiction in Parliament for the grant of exclusive jurisdiction to the Federal Court must be founded on exclusive federal powers under s. 91 of the Constitution Act. In so far as there is an alleged excess of that jurisdiction by Parliament, s. 101 of the Constitution Act cannot be read as the constitutional justification for the exclusion from the superior courts of the jurisdiction to pronounce upon it.

This has also been held to encompass determining the applicability of federal legislation, as "both relate to constitutional jurisdiction," while the federal courts have similar jurisdiction in such matters.

== See also ==
- Section 91(27) of the Constitution Act, 1867
