= Canada (AG) v Montreal (City of) =

- Supreme Court of Canada

Hearing: April 27 and 27, 1977 Judgment: January 19, 1978
- Full case name: The Attorney General of Canada v. The City of Montreal and the Attorney General for Quebec; Claire Dupond v. The City of Montreal and the Attorney General for Quebec
- Citations: [1978] 2 S.C.R. 770
- Prior history: Judgment for the City of Montreal and the Attorney General for Quebec in the Court of Appeal for Quebec.
- Ruling: Appeal dismissed

Holding
- 1. Legislation relating to the municipal domain, which are preventative and not punitive in nature, fall under the provincial legislative domain 2. When a law is of a local or private nature, a party claiming otherwise has the burden of proof.

Court membership
- Chief Justice: Bora Laskin; Puisne Justices: Ronald Martland, Roland Ritchie, Wishart Spence, Louis-Philippe Pigeon, Brian Dickson, Jean Beetz, Willard Estey, Yves Pratte

Reasons given
- Majority: Beetz J., joined by Martland, Judson, Ritchie, Pigeon, and de Grandpré JJ.
- Dissent: Laskin C.J., joined by Spence and Dickson JJ.

Canada (AG) v Montreal (City of), [1978] 2 S.C.R. 770 (also known as Dupond) is a constitutional decision of the Supreme Court of Canada. The Court upheld a municipal law that regulated the traffic by repressing disorderly conduct during public parades under the provincial constitutional authority to create laws of a "local nature" in section 92(16) of the Constitution Act, 1867.

The law was challenged as ultra vires the constitution as the law was claimed to be of a criminal law nature, a power exclusive to the federal government under section 91(27) of the Constitution Act, 1867, by preserving the peace and punishing disorderly conduct. However, City of Montreal cited Hodge v. The Queen, claiming that it allowed for a municipality to preserve peace and repress disorderly conduct in the context of a valid provincial program.

The Court agreed with the City and held in their favour. The Court held that the law was not criminal in nature as it was preventative and not punitive.

== See also ==
- List of Supreme Court of Canada cases (Laskin Court)
