= John Laskin =

John Laskin may refer to:

- John B. Laskin, justice in the Federal Court of Appeal of Canada
- John I. Laskin (born 1943), justice of the Court of Appeal for Ontario
