= MacDonald v Vapor Canada Ltd =

Judgement of the Supreme Court of Canada

MacDonald v Vapor Canada Ltd, [1977] 2 S.C.R. 134 is a leading constitutional decision of the Supreme Court of Canada (SCC) on the Trade and Commerce power under section 91(2) of the Constitution Act, 1867.

== Background ==
The federal Trade-marks Act provided remedies for acts or business practices that are "contrary to honest industrial or commercial usage in Canada". The constitutionality of these provisions were challenged as ultra vires of the federal government as it created civil remedy and cause of action for tort and contractual matters which is generally under the power of the provincial authority over property and civil rights.

The Federal Court of Appeal upheld the provision as valid under the Trade and Commerce power.

== Decision ==
In a unanimous decision, the SCC held that the provisions were unconstitutional.

Chief Justice Laskin, writing for the Court, found that the provisions encroached upon the province's authority over property and civil rights and could not be upheld under the trade and commerce branch. In considering the trade and commerce clause he examined the "general trade" branch of the clause first articulated in Citizen's Insurance Co. v. Parsons (1881). Laskin proposed a three-stage test for the "general trade" branch. First, there must be a "general regulatory scheme". Second, the scheme must have the "oversight of a regulatory agency", and third, the scheme must have a concern with "trade as a whole rather than a particular industry".

== Legacy ==
Laskin's proposed three-stage test was later modified by General Motors v. City of National Leasing (1989) with two supplementary stages: Fourth, the scheme is of a nature that the provinces would be constitutionally incapable of enacting it; and fifth, failure to include one or more provinces or localities in the scheme would jeopardize its operation in other parts of the country.

== See also ==
- List of Supreme Court of Canada cases (Laskin Court)
