= Reference Re BC Motor Vehicle Act =

- Supreme Court of Canada

Hearing: November 15, 1984 Judgment: December 17, 1985
- Full case name: Reference Re Section 94(2) of the Motor Vehicle Act
- Citations: [1985] 2 SCR 486
- Docket No.: 17590
- Prior history: On appeal from the BCCA
- Ruling: Appeal was dismissed

Holding
- Absolute liability offences cannot carry a possibility of imprisonment under the Charter

Court membership
- Chief Justice: Brian Dickson; Puisne Justices: Roland Ritchie, Jean Beetz, Willard Estey, William McIntyre, Julien Chouinard, Antonio Lamer, Bertha Wilson, Gerald Le Dain

Reasons given
- Majority: Lamer J (paras 1–98), joined by Dickson CJ and Beetz, Chouinard and Le Dain JJ
- Concurrence: MacIntyre J (paras 99–100)
- Concurrence: Wilson J (paras 101–131)
- Ritchie and Estey JJ took no part in the consideration or decision of the case.

Reference Re BC Motor Vehicle Act, [1985] 2 SCR 486, was a landmark reference submitted to the Supreme Court of Canada regarding the constitutionality of the British Columbia Motor Vehicle Act. The decision established one of the first principles of fundamental justice in the Canadian Charter of Rights and Freedoms ("Charter"), beyond mere natural justice, by requiring a fault component for all offences with penal consequences. The decision also proved important and controversial for establishing fundamental justice as more than a procedural right similar to due process, but also protects substantive rights even though such rights were counter to the intent of the initial drafters of the Charter.

== Background ==
Section 94(2) of the Motor Vehicle Act of British Columbia created an absolute liability offence of driving while with a suspended licence. To obtain a conviction, the Crown needed only to establish proof of driving regardless of whether the driver was aware of the suspension. A successful conviction carried a prison term of a minimum of seven days.

The British Columbia Court of Appeal held that the Act violated a principle of fundamental justice under section 7 of the Charter.

== Decision ==
Lamer J, writing for a unanimous court, held that an absolute liability, which makes a person liable for an offence whether he or she took steps not to be at fault, violates the principles of fundamental justice. Therefore, any possibility of a deprivation of life, liberty or security of person from an absolute liability offence offends the Charter. A law that violates section 7 cannot be saved by section 1 of the Charter except for extreme circumstances (for example, natural disasters, outbreaks of war, epidemics). The principles of fundamental justice impose a stricter test than section 1. Thus, any law that violates the principles of fundamental justice will most likely not be saved by section 1.

In surveying means of interpreting the constitution, Lamer dismissed the practice of relying on the testimony of the original drafters of the Constitution as interpretive aids and effectively rejected the use of an original intent approach to constitutional interpretation. Reference was made to the living tree doctrine.

The Court also rejected the more restricted definition of fundamental justice under the Canadian Bill of Rights, as described in Duke v R.

The Court noted the alternative view of fundamental justice as natural justice would have been an easier requirement for the government to satisfy. That would limit the rights to life, liberty, and security of person, or, as the Supreme Court put it, place the rights "in a sorely emaciated state". Liberty, for example, would be seen as not as comprehensive a right as section 9, which guards against arbitrary arrest and detention. Security of person would also be less comprehensive than section 8 rights against unreasonable search and seizure. Such an interpretation, the Court decided, would be inconsistent with the normal reading of the Charter, demonstrated in Law Society of Upper Canada v Skapinker and Hunter v Southam Inc, which was meant to be generous. Lamer added that sections 8 to 14 should be seen as provided examples of principles of fundamental justice.

Another reason for discarding the Duke interpretation of fundamental justice was the difference in wording between the Bill of Rights and the Charter. In guaranteeing fundamental justice, the Bill of Rights references a "fair hearing". Section 7 does not mention a fair hearing, and the only context for fundamental justice is the "much more fundamental rights" of life, liberty and security of person.

== See also ==
- List of Supreme Court of Canada cases
