= R v Beattie =

R. v. Beattie was a Court of Appeal for Ontario case in which the defendant, John Beattie, was accused of child pornography possession after police entered his home and "seized a three-ring binder containing thirty-three stories describing, in graphic language, sexual activities between adults and children under the age of fourteen." Robert J. Danay noted that John I. Laskin, writing for the Court, "found it necessary to include an entire section in his judgment in which the stories were described, graphically excerpted and categorized in meticulous detail".
