= Patriation Reference =

- Supreme Court of Canada

Hearing: 28, 29, 30 April and 1 and 4 May 1981 Judgment: 28 September 1981
- Full case name: Re Resolution to amend the Constitution
- Citations: [1981] 1 SCR 753
- Prior history: On appeal from decisions of the Quebec Court of Appeal, the Manitoba Court of Appeal, and the Newfoundland Court of Appeal

Holding
- Issue 1: A majority of the court (7–2) held that as a matter of constitutional law, the federal Parliament could unilaterally request that the British Parliament amend the Canadian Constitution, without consent from the provinces. Issue 2: A majority of the court (6–3) held that as a matter of constitutional convention, a substantial degree of provincial consent was required for the amendment of the Canadian Constitution.

Court membership
- Chief Justice: Bora Laskin
- Puisne Justices: Ronald Martland, Roland Ritchie, Brian Dickson, Jean Beetz, Willard Estey, William McIntyre, Julien Chouinard, Antonio Lamer.

Reasons given
- Majority: Constitutional law issue: Laskin C.J., Dickson, Beetz, Estey, McIntyre, Chouinard and Lamer JJ.
- Majority: Constitutional convention issue: Martland, Ritchie, Dickson, Beetz, Chouinard and Lamer JJ.
- Dissent: Constitutional law issue: Martland and Ritchie JJ.
- Dissent: Constitutional convention issue: Laskin C.J., Estey and McIntyre JJ.

Reference Re Resolution to amend the Constitution – also known as the Patriation Reference – is a historic Supreme Court of Canada reference case that occurred during negotiations for the patriation of the Constitution of Canada.

The court affirmed the existence of an unwritten dimension to the constitution and the majority held that by constitutional convention, amendments to the constitution require a substantial degree of provincial consent. However, a differently-constituted majority of the court held that there was no legal barrier to the federal government seeking a constitutional amendment without any provincial consent.

== Political debate over patriating the Constitution ==
Under the leadership of Prime Minister Pierre Elliot Trudeau, the federal government of Canada sought to patriate the constitution. Specifically, the aim of the government was to make a request to the United Kingdom Parliament—then the only body with the appropriate legal authority—to amend the Constitution of Canada, adding to it a domestic amendment formula (permitting Canada to henceforth modify the constitution itself) and entrenching the Canadian Charter of Rights and Freedoms. "Canada would have its own constitution, with a procedure for making future amendments to it, and with a Charter of Rights."

Initially, the federal government did not have support from the provincial governments. Only Ontario and New Brunswick supported the plan. The eight other Canadian provinces eventually came to support the federal government's plan.

== References to the provincial courts of appeal ==
Governments in Canada can refer questions of law to the courts for advisory opinions, a process called reference cases. Following the impasse between the federal government and the eight provinces which opposed its plans, three provincial governments – Newfoundland, Quebec, and Manitoba – "asked for rulings from their provincial Courts of Appeal on the constitutionality of the federal government's proposed plan". Among their other reasons for opposing the plan to patriate the constitution, these three provinces argued that the federal government did not have the authority to ask the UK Parliament to make fundamental changes to the Constitution of Canada without the consent of all of the provinces. Each reference case was argued separately in the three provincial courts of appeal.

=== Quebec reference case ===
Quebec asked two questions:

- First, would the proposed amendments to the constitution "affect the legislative competence of the provincial legislatures", or the "status or role of the provincial legislatures or governments within the Canadian Federation"?
- Second, did the constitution "empower ... the Senate and the House of Commons to cause the Canadian Constitution to be amended without the consent of the provinces and in spite of the objection of several of them", in such a way as to affect the legislative competence of the provincial legislatures, or the status and role of the provincial legislatures and governments within the Canadian Federation?

The Quebec Court of Appeal sat a panel of five judges to hear the case: Chief Justice Crête and Justices Owen, Turgeon, Belanger and Bisson. The court unanimously held that the proposed amendments would affect the legislative competence of the provincial legislatures, and the status and role of the provincial legislatures and governments. It therefore answered "Yes" to both parts of the first question.

The court divided (4–1) on the second question. The majority (Crête C.J.Q., Owen, Turgeon, and Belanger JJ.) held that the constitution did give the House of Commons and the Senate the power to make unilateral changes to the constitution, by requesting those changes from the British government. They therefore answered "Yes" to both parts of Question 2. Bisson J. dissented. He concluded that the federal government could not make the unilateral changes, and therefore answered "No" to both parts of Question 2.

=== Manitoba reference case ===
Manitoba posed three questions to the Manitoba Court of Appeal:

- First, would the proposed amendments to the constitution affect the "powers, rights, or privileges granted or secured ... to the provinces, their legislatures or governments", and if so in what respects?
- Second, did a constitutional convention exist in Canada obliging the federal Parliament to obtain the agreement of the provinces before requesting an amendment to the constitution that would affect the powers rights or privileges of the provinces?
- Third, was there a constitutional requirement that the agreement of the provinces be obtained in order to amend the constitution in a way that would affect the powers, rights, or privileges of the provinces?

The court ruled that the federal government could act unilaterally.

=== Newfoundland reference case ===
Newfoundland raised the same questions as Manitoba, and added a fourth:

- Could the Terms of Union between Newfoundland and Canada be amended "directly or indirectly ... without the consent of the Government, Legislature or a majority of the people in the Province of Newfoundland voting in a referendum"?

The court ruled that the federal government could not act unilaterally.

== Appeals to the Supreme Court of Canada ==
The parties then appealed from the three provincial courts of appeal to the Supreme Court, which heard the three appeals together. The federal government and all ten provinces participated in the appeals.

=== Answers ===
The court was unanimous in its affirmative answer to the first question of the Manitoba and Newfoundland References (and the first question asked by Quebec, which the court took to be equivalent): the proposed changes to the constitution would indeed affect the "powers, rights, or privileges" of the provinces.

The court combined the remaining questions into two major issues and addressed those issues in two different rulings. The first ruling dealt with the question of legality: did the federal government have the legal authority to unilaterally seek an amendment to the constitution, without the consent of the provinces? The second ruling dealt with the question of constitutional conventions: did a convention exist obliging the federal government to seek the consent of the provinces before asking the Parliament of the United Kingdom to modify the constitution?

Seven judges, a majority, found that the federal government had the legal authority to unilaterally seek the amendment of the constitution without consent of the provinces.

As to the second matter, the judges unanimously agreed that constitutional conventions exist in Canada, and a majority found that the federal government's plan to seek the amendment of the constitution without provincial consent did indeed violate such a convention. However, that majority also argued that it was not the role of the courts to enforce constitutional conventions, stating that "they are generally in conflict with the legal rules which they postulate and the courts are bound to enforce the legal rules."

== Aftermath ==
The decision was unique at the time as it was the first to be televised live on national television.

The decision has a broader significance to all common law jurisdictions as it is authority for the proposition that a convention cannot, even through long and rigorous usage, "crystallize" into law. In 2013 historian Frédéric Bastien said in a book (La Bataille de Londres, Boréal) that two judges of the Supreme Court, Willard Estey, and Chief Justice Bora Laskin shared confidential information to British and Canadian politicians, as the Supreme Court was hearing the case. He based his assertion on secret British documents recently declassified. According to Bastien, this is a violation of the independence of the judiciary. He concludes that the patriation reference has no legitimacy whatsoever and should be considered void and of no effect.
