= Harrison v Carswell =

Judgement of the Supreme Court of Canada

Harrison v Carswell (1975), [1976] 2 S.C.R. 200 is a famous pre-Charter decision of the Supreme Court of Canada where the Court denied the right to protest as a freedom of expression.

== Facts ==
Sophie Carswell, employee of one of the businesses located in the Polo Park Shopping Centre (Winnipeg, MB), was participating in a strike and picketing in front of her place of work, when the manager of said shopping centre, Peter Harrison, requested that she and the other picketers leave the area or they would be charged with trespass under the Petty Trespasses Act of Manitoba (1970). Carswell continued to picket, and was therefore charged with trespassing. She was initially convicted by the County Court, but then this judgment was reversed by the Manitoba Court of Appeal. Harrison then asked for leave to appeal to the Supreme Court, and the case was heard by this Court in 1976.

== Opinion of the Court ==
The Court held that there was no right of a store employee to protest in a shopping centre when it was against the wishes of the centre. The centre was held to be sufficiently under the control of the owner and did not constitute a public place, thus the owner had the right to protect the private property under trespass.

The decision heavily relies on a case also previously decided by the Supreme Court of Canada, Peters v The Queen (1971), 17 DLR (3d) 128. In that case, the Supreme Court decided that the owner of a shopping mall had "sufficient control or possession of the common areas" of the mall so as to be able to claim that the picketers in the Peters case were in fact trespassing. As the Peters case could not sufficiently be distinguished from the Harrison case, Justice Dickson states, it could not be decided otherwise. In fact, deciding otherwise might have raised questions as to "the limits of judicial function".

The decision therefore tries to address three separate issues:

1. Can we distinguish Peters from the current case?
2. What is the role of the judiciary in the interpretation of the law?
3. What degree of control does the property owner have? Can he/she invoke trespass even for people who are engaging in a lawful activity, such as striking?

Justice Dickson and the majority of the Court found that the two cases were indistinguishable and, as the first one recognized to the owner the right to invoke trespass, the Court was compelled to make a similar decision in the Harrison case. The Court, therefore, refused to read an exception in the existing statute (The Petty Trespasses Act of Manitoba) for a lawful activity (in this case, striking), as such exception should be decided by the Legislature and not by the Court.

== Dissent ==
In one of his most famous dissents, Chief Justice Laskin held that the centre was a public place as the public had free access to the place.

If it was necessary to categorise the legal situation which, in my view, arises upon the opening of a shopping centre, with public areas of the kind I have mentioned (at least where the opening is not accompanied by an announced limitation on the classes of public entrants), I would say that the members of the public are privileged visitors whose privilege is revocable only upon misbehaviour (and I need not spell out here what this embraces) or by reason of unlawful activity. Such a view reconciles both the interests of the shopping centre owner and of members of the public, doing violence to neither and recognising the mutual or reciprocal commercial interests of shopping centre owner, business tenants and members of the public upon which the shopping centre is based.

Laskin also argues for a view of property rights balanced by the rights of others. He also distinguishes Harrison from the Peters case based on the fact that, in this case, the appellant had an interest sanctioned by law, in pursuing legitimate claims against her employer.

Additionally, he calls for a more reasoned adoption of stare decisis by the Supreme Court of Canada. This would allow the Court to depart from some of its previous decisions as it comes to realize that social conditions are changing:

This Court, above all others in this country, cannot be simply mechanistic about previous decisions ... we are free to depart :from previous decisions in order to support the pressing need to examine the present case on its merits.

== Aftermath ==
In Post-Charter Canada the question remains unresolved. The Court's multiple reasons in Committee for the Commonwealth of Canada v. Canada [1991] 1 SCR 139 leave things particularly ambiguous. Shortly after the decision the Manitoba government amended The Petty Trespasses Act to allow picketing and other forms of communication of "true statements" on mall property. The legislation recognizes malls as public spaces where arbitrary withdrawal is no longer lawful on behalf of mall owners.
