= Fair comment =

Legal term

Fair comment is a legal term for a common law defense in defamation cases (libel or slander). It is referred to as honest comment in some countries.

== United States ==
In the United States, the traditional privilege (inherited from British common law) of "fair comment" is seen as a protection for robust, even outrageous published or spoken opinions about public officials and public figures. Fair comment is defined as a "common law defense [that] guarantees the freedom of the press to express statements on matters of public interest, as long as the statements are not made with ill will, spite, or with the intent to harm the plaintiff".

The defense of "fair comment" in the U.S. since 1964 has largely been replaced by the ruling in New York Times Co. v. Sullivan, 376 U.S. 254 (1964). This case relied on the issue of actual malice, which involves the defendant making a statement known at the time to be false, or which was made with a "reckless disregard" of whether the statement was true or false. If "actual malice" cannot be shown, the defense of "fair comment" is then superseded by the broader protection of the failure by the plaintiff to show "actual malice".

Each state writes its own laws of defamation, and the laws and previously decided precedents in each state vary. In many states, (including Alabama where the case of Times v. Sullivan originated), the "fair comment" defense requires that the "privilege of 'fair comment' for expressions of opinion depends on the truth of the facts upon which the comment is based" according to U.S Supreme Court Justice Brennan who wrote the ruling in Times v. Sullivan.

"Actual malice" removes the requirement of being faultless in the reporting of the facts by the defendant. (Under the law prior to this decision any false statement could, if found to be defamatory, be grounds for damages.) Instead it raises the question of whether factual errors were made in good faith. "Actual malice" means then that the defendant intentionally made false statements of alleged facts, or recklessly failed to verify alleged facts when any reasonable person would have checked. If it is held that the defendant made intentionally false statements of fact, that will form a powerful argument that any statements of opinion based upon those facts were made with malice. If the plaintiff can prove malice on the part of the defendant the common law defense of "fair comment" is defeated.

The "actual malice" standard only applies when the statement is about a "public official", or a "public figure", or in some cases about a "matter of public interest". When it does apply it offers so much more protection to the defendant that it would be very rare for the defendant to assert "fair comment" instead. When the allegedly defamatory statement is about a purely private person, who is not a "public figure" in any way, the defendant may need to resort to the defense of "fair comment" instead.

== Canada ==
In Canada, for something to constitute fair comment, the comment must be on a matter of public interest (excluding gossip), based on known and provable facts, must be an opinion that any person is capable of holding based on those facts, and with no actual malice underlying it. The cardinal test of whether a statement is fair comment is whether it is recognizable as an opinion rather than a statement of fact, and whether it could be drawn from the known facts. There was formerly a rule stating that the opinion must be honestly held by the publisher (See Chernesky v. Armadale Publications Ltd. [1978] 6 W.W.R. 618 (S.C.C.)) but this rule was changed to one requiring that the opinion is capable of being held by anyone. (See Rafe Mair v. Kari Simpson [2008] 2 S.C.R. 420)

== United Kingdom ==
Fletcher-Moulton LJ said in Hunt v Star Newspaper [1908] 2 KB 309, Tab 3, at 319-320, CA:

“The law as to fair comment, so far as is material to the present case, stands as follows: In the first place, comment in order to be justifiable as fair comment must appear as comment and must not be so mixed up with the facts that the reader cannot distinguish between what is report and what is comment: see Andrews v. Chapman. [FN16] The justice of this rule is obvious. If the facts are stated separately and the comment appears as an inference drawn from those facts, any injustice that it might do will be to some extent negatived by the reader seeing the grounds upon which the unfavourable inference is based. But if fact and comment be intermingled so that it is not reasonably clear what portion purports to be inference, he will naturally suppose that the injurious statements are based on adequate grounds known to the writer though not necessarily set out by him. In the one case the insufficiency of the facts to support the inference will lead fair-minded men to reject the inference. In the other case it merely points to the existence of extrinsic facts which the writer considers to warrant the language he uses. In this relation *320 I must express my disagreement with the view apparently taken by the Court of Queen's Bench in Ireland in the case of Lefroy v. Burnside [FN17], where the imputation was that the plaintiffs dishonestly and corruptly supplied to a newspaper certain information. The Court treated the qualifications "dishonestly" or "corruptly" as clearly comment. In my opinion they are not comment, but constitute allegations of fact. It would have startled a pleader of the old school if he had been told that, in alleging that the defendant "fraudulently represented," he was indulging in comment. By the use of the word "fraudulently" he was probably making the most important allegation of fact in the whole case. Any matter, therefore, which does not indicate with a reasonable clearness that it purports to be comment, and not statement of fact, cannot be protected by the plea of fair comment. In the next place, in order to give room for the plea of fair comment the facts must be truly stated. If the facts upon which the comment purports to be made do not exist the foundation of the plea fails. This has been so frequently laid down authoritatively that I do not need to dwell further upon it: see, for instance, the direction given by Kennedy J. to the jury in Joynt v. Cycle Trade Publishing Co. [FN18], which has been frequently approved of by the Courts.”

In Branson v Bower [2002] QB 737, at p 748, para 29, Eady J said:

“The comment must be upon ‘facts truly stated’ [29] A commentator must not deliberately distort the true situation. That would be relevant on "malice" even according to Lord Nicholls's criterion. It would not be honest. The matter of distortion (whether dishonest or otherwise) may also come into play, however, at the stage of the objective test, because one cannot decide whether a hypothetical commentator could hold an opinion in a vacuum. Even at this point, it is surely necessary to test the matter against some factual assumptions.”

Whether the comment is fair, Diplock J (as Lord Diplock then was) said in a summing up to jury in Silkin v. Beaverbrook Newspapers Ltd. and Another [1958] 1 WLR 743, Tab 5, at 749:

“Would a fair-minded man holding strong views, obstinate views, prejudiced views, have been capable of making this comment? If the answer to that is yes, then your verdict in this case should be a verdict for the defendants. … If you were to take the view that it was so strong a comment that no fair-minded man could honestly have made it, then the defence fails and you would have to consider the question of damages.”

In relation to malice in the context of fair comment (which is different from the malice in the context of qualified privilege), Lord Nicholls of Birkenhead NPJ said in Albert Cheng v Tse Wai Chun (2000) 3 HKCFAR 339 at p 360I to 361D:

“My conclusion on the authorities is that, for the most part, the relevant judicial statements are consistent with the views which I have expressed as a matter of principle. To summarise, in my view a comment which falls within the objective limits of the defence of fair comment can lose its immunity only by proof that the defendant did not genuinely hold the view he expressed. Honesty of belief is the touchstone. Actuation by spite, animosity, intent to injure, intent to arouse controversy or other motivation, whatever it may be, even if it is the dominant or sole motive, does not of itself defeat the defence. However, proof of such motivation may be evidence, sometimes compelling evidence, from which lack of genuine belief in the view expressed may be inferred. Proof of motivation may also be relevant on other issues in the action, such as damages. It is said that this view of the law would have the undesirable consequence that malice would bear different meanings in the defences of fair comment and qualified privilege, and that this would inevitably cause difficulty for juries. I agree that if the term 'malice' were used, there might be a risk of confusion. The answer lies in shunning that word altogether. Juries can be instructed, regarding fair comment, that the defence is defeated by proof that the defendant did not genuinely believe the opinion he expressed. Regarding qualified privilege, juries can be directed that the defence is defeated by proof that the defendant used the occasion for some purpose other than that for which the occasion was privileged. This direction can be elaborated in a manner appropriate to the facts and issues in the case.”

The common law defence of fair comment in an action for defamation was abolished in England and Wales by the Defamation Act 2013, replaced with the statutory defence of honest opinion.
