= RJR-MacDonald Inc v Canada (AG) =

Canadian constitutional law case

- Supreme Court of Canada

Hearing: November 29–30, 1994 Judgment: September 21, 1995
- Full case name: RJR-MacDonald Inc and Imperial Tobacco Ltd v The Attorney General of Canada
- Citations: [1995] 3 S.C.R. 199, 127 D.L.R. (4th) 1, 100 C.C.C. (3d) 449, 31 C.R.R. (2d) 189, 62 C.P.R. (3d) 417
- Docket No.: 23490

Holding
- The Tobacco Products Control Act was upheld under the federal government's criminal law power, but the provisions prohibiting advertising and requiring unattributed warning labels was struck down under the Charter right to freedom of expression.

Court membership
- Chief Justice: Antonio Lamer; Puisne Justices: Gérard La Forest, Claire L'Heureux-Dubé, John Sopinka, Charles Gonthier, Peter Cory, Beverley McLachlin, Frank Iacobucci, John C. Major

Reasons given
- Majority: McLachlin J. (paras. 122–178)
- Concurrence: Major J. (paras. 193–217)
- Concurrence: Iacobucci J. (paras. 179–192)
- Concurrence: Lamer C.J. (para. 1)
- Concurrence: Sopinka J. (para. 120)
- Dissent: La Forest J. (paras. 2–119), joined by L'Heureux-Dube and Gonthier JJ.
- Dissent: Cory J. (para. 121)

RJR-MacDonald Inc v Canada (AG), [1995] 3 S.C.R. 199 is a leading Canadian constitutional decision of the Supreme Court of Canada that upheld the federal Tobacco Products Control Act but struck out the provisions that prevented tobacco advertising and unattributed health warnings.

== Background ==
RJR MacDonald Inc. and Imperial Tobacco challenged the Act as being ultra vires the federal government's criminal law power and peace, order and good government power, and as being in violation of the right to freedom of expression under section 2(b) of the Canadian Charter of Rights and Freedoms.

== Reasons of the court ==
The Court upheld the Act as valid under the criminal law power but found that sections 4, 8, and 9 of the Act violated freedom of expression and could not be saved under section 1 of the Charter. There were four separate opinions given.

=== Division of powers ===
The Court found the Act was not colourable. The evil that the law is addressing does not have to be approached directly, and in those circumstances, it would not be practical. Even though the subject was not one that was commonly recognized as being criminal, that does not necessarily invalidate it.

=== Charter issues ===
The majority held that the impugned sections violated the freedom of expression under section 2(b) of the Charter. The right to freedom of expression includes the right to say nothing. The mandatory use of unattributed labels was a form of forced expression and so invoked section 2(b).

The majority held that the violation was not upheld under section 1 of the Charter.

== See also ==
- List of Supreme Court of Canada cases (Lamer Court)
