= John B. Laskin =

Canadian judge

Judge of the Federal Court of Appeal of Canada
- Incumbent
- Assumed office June 21, 2017

John B. Laskin is a justice of the Federal Court of Appeal of Canada.

He was appointed as a law professor at the University of Toronto, and subsequently worked as a trial and appellate lawyer for over 30 years at Torys LLP in Toronto.

His uncle is Bora Laskin, formerly chief justice of Canada. His cousin is John I. Laskin, formerly a judge of the Court of Appeal for Ontario.
