= Manitoba Fisheries Ltd v R =

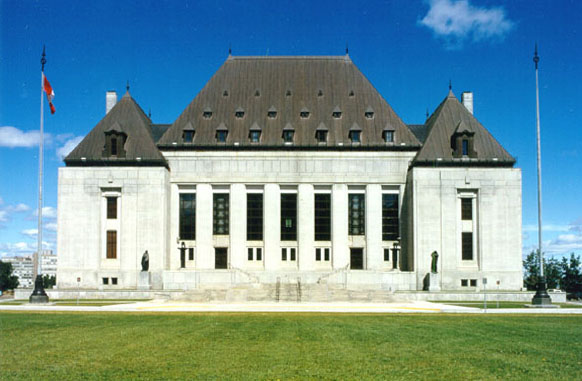
- Court: Supreme Court of Canada
- Decided: 1978-10-03
- Citation: [1979] 1 SCR 101, (1978) 88 DLR (3d) 462, 1978 CanLII 22

Case history
- Prior actions: Manitoba Fisheries Ltd. v. The Queen, [1978] 1 F.C. 485; Manitoba Fisheries Limited and Harry Gordon Marder and Sophia Marder v. The Queen, [1976] F.C.J. No. 230, [1977] 2 F.C. 457
- Appealed from: Federal Court of Appeal

Court membership
- Judges sitting: Ritchie, Spence, Pigeon, Dickson, Beetz, Estey and Pratte JJ.

Case opinions
- Decision by: Ritchie J.

Keywords
- expropriation, regulatory taking, fisheries, goodwill, property

Manitoba Fisheries Ltd v R (1978), [1979] 1 SCR 101, is a leading Canadian property law decision by the Supreme Court of Canada on expropriation. The court held that the Freshwater Fish Marketing Act, RSC 1970, c F-13, which granted a Crown corporation a monopoly over fish exports from Manitoba, deprived the appellants of goodwill. This deprivation amounted to an uncompensated regulatory taking (also known as a de facto expropriation).

== Background ==
In 1969 the Federal government passed the Freshwater Fish Marketing Act, granting the Freshwater Fish Marketing Corporation, a federal agency, a monopoly on the export of fish from Manitoba as well as other participating provinces. The Crown corporation was authorized to issue licenses to private firms, but did not do so in Manitoba.

Under the terms of an agreement between the Government of Manitoba and the Government of Canada, the Province and the Federal government would compensate those affected "for any such plant or equipment that will or may be rendered redundant by reason of any operations authorized to be carried out by the Corporation under the Act."

Manitoba Fisheries Ltd. was one of several private commercial distributors who were put out of business by the legislation, and brought an action against the federal government for compensation of their loss of business suffered as a result of the Act.

== Reasons of the court ==
The court developed a two-part test to determine whether there has been a regulatory taking: first, what the claimant has lost must be "property" in the context of the legislative scheme, and second, the property must have been acquired by the government.

It was held that the legislation rendered the appellant's physical assets "virtually useless" and that the goodwill built up by the business was as much a part of its business assets as its physical property:

[T]he Freshwater Fish Marketing Act and the Corporation created thereunder had the effect of depriving the appellant of its goodwill as a going concern and consequently rendering its physical assets virtually useless and that the goodwill so taken away constitutes property of the appellant for the loss of which no compensation whatever has been paid.

The court then applied the common law rule from Attorney General v De Keyser's Royal Hotel Ltd, [1920] AC 508, that "unless the words of the statute clearly so demand, a statute is not to be construed so as to take away the property of a subject without compensation", finding that the appellants were entitled to full compensation "in an amount equal to the fair market value of its business as a going concern as at May 1, 1969, minus the residual value of its remaining assets as of that date".

== See also ==
- List of Supreme Court of Canada cases (Laskin Court)
- Eminent domain in Canada
