= Morgan v Prince Edward Island (AG) =

Judgement of the Supreme Court of Canada

Morgan v Prince Edward Island (AG), [1976] 2 S.C.R. 349 is a leading decision of the Supreme Court of Canada on mobility rights, prior to the inclusion of these rights in section 6 of the Canadian Charter of Rights and Freedoms. The Court upheld a law that limited the amount of land that could be held by someone who was not a resident of the province.

Prince Edward Island enacted a law prohibiting non-residents from owning more than 25 acres (100,000 m^{2}) or 5 "chains" of property unless they had permission from the minister. The legislation was challenged on the basis that the matter was outside the jurisdiction of the province, because it related to federal matters of citizenship and naturalization under section 91(25) of the Constitution Act, 1867.

Laskin, for the majority, held that the law was valid provincial law under the provincial authority over property and civil rights.

== See also ==
- List of Supreme Court of Canada cases (Laskin Court)
