= Absolute liability =

Standard of liability in tort and criminal law

Absolute liability is a standard of legal liability found in tort and criminal law of various legal jurisdictions.

To be convicted of an ordinary crime, in certain jurisdictions, a person must not only have committed a criminal action but also have had a deliberate intention or guilty mind (mens rea). In a crime of strict or absolute liability, a person could be guilty even if there was no intention to commit a crime. The difference between strict and absolute liability is whether the defence of a “mistake of fact” is available: in a crime of absolute liability, a mistake of fact is not a defence. Strict or absolute liability can also arise from inherently dangerous activities or defective products that are likely to result in a harm to another, regardless of protection taken, such as owning a pet rattle snake; negligence is not required to be proven.

== Australia ==
The Australian Criminal Code Act 1995 defines absolute liability in Division 6, subsection 2:

(1) If a law that creates an offence provides that the offence is an offence of absolute liability:

(a) there are no fault elements for any of the physical elements of the offence; and
(b) the defence of mistake of fact under section 9.2 is unavailable.

Absolute liability does not allow a mistake of fact defence to be used, as opposed to strict liability.

Regulatory bodies tend to favour the approach of declaring offences to be strict or absolute liability, because it makes it easier to prosecute people: there is no longer a requirement to demonstrate that the defendant was deliberately intending to commit an offence. Jurists consider such a mechanism to be a blunt instrument, and recommend its use only in limited circumstances:

Absolute liability is used for certain regulatory offences in which it is necessary for individuals engaged in potentially hazardous or harmful activity to exercise extreme, and not merely reasonable, care. Such offences as exceeding 60 kilometres per hour in a 60 kilometre zone, causing pollution to waters, selling alcohol to underage persons, refusing or failing to submit to breath testing and publishing a name in breach of a suppression order. In these cases, the courts accepted that the benefits to the community overrode any potential negative impact on the accused person.

== Canada ==
In Canada, absolute liability is one of three types of criminal or regulatory offences. In R v City of Sault Ste-Marie, the Supreme Court of Canada defined an absolute liability offence as an offence "where it is not open to the accused to exculpate himself by showing that he was free of fault". This can be compared to a strict liability offence (where an accused can raise the defence of due diligence) and mens rea offences (where the prosecutor has to prove that the accused had some positive state of mind).

Generally, criminal offences are presumed to be mens rea offences, and regulatory offences are presumed to be strict liability offences. Therefore, most offences are not absolute liability offences, and usually will require an explicit statement in the statute. To determine if an offence is an absolute liability offence, the courts must look at:

- The overall regulatory pattern;
- The subject matter of the legislation;
- The importance of the penalty; and
- The precision of the language used in the statute.

The combination of an absolute liability offence and the possible sentence of jail violates section 7 of the Canadian Charter of Rights and Freedoms and is unconstitutional. Specifically, jail violates a person's liberty and an absolute liability offence is not in accordance with the principles of fundamental justice. (See Re B.C. Motor Vehicle Act.)

== India ==
In Indian tort law, absolute liability is a standard of tort liability that stipulates:

where an enterprise is engaged in a hazardous or inherently dangerous activity and harm results to anyone on account of an accident in the operation of such hazardous or inherently dangerous activity resulting, for example, in escape of toxic gas the enterprise is strictly and absolutely liable to compensate all those who are affected by the accident and such liability is not subject to any of the exceptions which operate vis-à-vis the tortious principle of strict liability under the rule in Rylands v. Fletcher.

In other words, absolute liability is strict liability without any exception. That liability standard has been laid down by the Indian Supreme Court in M.C. Mehta v. Union of India (Oleum Gas Leak Case).

The Indian judiciary tried to make a strong effort following the Bhopal disaster in December 1984 (Union Carbide Company v. Union of India) to enforce greater amount of protection to the public. The doctrine of absolute liability was therefore evolved in the Oleum gas leak case and can be said to be a strong legal tool against rogue corporations that were negligent towards health risks for the public. This legal doctrine was much more powerful than the legal doctrine of strict liability developed in the English tort law case Rylands v Fletcher [1868]. This meant that the defaulter could be held liable for even third party errors when the public was at a realistic risk. This could ensure stricter compliance to standards that were meant to safeguard the public.
