= R v Hauser =

Judgement of the Supreme Court of Canada

R v Hauser, [1979] 1 S.C.R. 984 is a leading constitutional decision of the Supreme Court of Canada, where, in a four to three decision, the Court upheld the federal Narcotic Control Act as constitutional under the peace, order and good government power. This case is particularly unusual as the Act had previously held to be constitutional under the Criminal law power in the decision of Industrial Acceptance Corp. v. The Queen [1953] 2 S.C.R. 273.

Hauser, the respondent, was charged by indictment on two counts under the Narcotic Control Act: possession of cannabis resin for the purpose of trafficking, and possession of cannabis (marijuana) for the same purpose, contrary to s. 4(2). The indictment was signed and preferred by an agent of the Attorney General of Canada. The respondent then moved for prohibition, challenging the constitutional validity of s. 2 para. (b) of the Criminal Code which defines the term "Attorney General" in various situations. The respondent's argument was that because para. (b) gives the Attorney General of Canada the power to (1) prefer indictments for an offence under the Narcotic Control Act, and (2)have the conduct of proceedings under said act instituted at the instance of the Government of Canada, it steps upon the rights granted to the Provinces under s. 92(14) of the British North America Act 1867 (AKA Constitution Act 1867)for "The Administration of Justice in the Province, including the Constitution, Maintenance, and Organization of Provincial Courts, both of Civil and of Criminal Jurisdiction, and including Procedure in Civil Matters in those Courts."

The Attorney General of Canada correctly asserted that the Canadian Government has authority under s. 91(27) of the Constitution Act 1867 Act to legislate in regards to "the Criminal Law, except the Constitution of Courts of Criminal Jurisdiction, but including the Procedure in Criminal Matters." He argued that the Narcotic Control Act is not criminal law because it is an act separate from the Criminal Code, and therefore the jurisdiction belongs with him and not with the Provincial Attorneys General. Appeal was granted by the Appellate Division of the Supreme Court of Alberta.

Laskin, C.J. posed the constitutional questions to the court as follows: Is it within the competence of the Parliament of Canada to enact legislation as in Section 2 of the Criminal Code to authorize the Attorney General of Canada or his Agent:

1. to prefer indictments for an offence under the Narcotic Control Act,
2. to have the conduct of proceedings instituted at the instance of the Government of Canada in respect of a violation or conspiracy to violate any Act of the Parliament of Canada or regulations made thereunder other than the Criminal Code?

Pigeon J., writing for the majority, held that the matter of law had sufficient "newness" to fall under the p.o.g.g. power, stating that:

...the most important consideration for classifying the Narcotic Control Act as legislation enacted under the general residual federal power, is that this is essentially legislation adopted to deal with a genuinely new problem which did not exist at the time of Confederation and clearly cannot be put in the class of "Matters of a merely local or private nature".

Dickson J. wrote the dissenting opinion, stating that he believed the Narcotics Control Act to be, in pith and substance, criminal law and therefore the responsibility of the Provinces, citing many cases of common law and established precedents.

== See also ==
- List of Supreme Court of Canada cases (Laskin Court)
