= Louis-Philippe de Grandpré =

Canadian judge (1917–2008)

The Honourable Louis-Philippe de Grandpré CC GOQ QC AdE
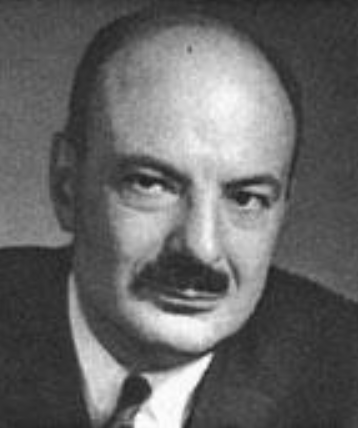
- Photo of Louis-Philippe de Grandpré

Puisne Justice of the Supreme Court of Canada
- In office January 1, 1974 – October 1, 1977
- Nominated by: Pierre Trudeau
- Preceded by: Douglas Abbott
- Succeeded by: Yves Pratte

44th President of the Canadian Bar Association
- In office 1972–1973
- Preceded by: John Lauchlan Farris
- Succeeded by: Neil McKelvey

Personal details
- Born: February 6, 1917 Montreal, Quebec, Canada
- Died: January 24, 2008 (aged 90) Saint-Lambert, Quebec, Canada
- Resting place: Notre Dame des Neiges Cemetery
- Relations: Jean de Grandpré (brother); Pierre de Grandpré (brother)

Louis-Philippe de Grandpré CC GOQ QC AdE (February 6, 1917 – January 24, 2008) was a Canadian lawyer and puisne justice of the Supreme Court of Canada.

== Family and early life ==
Louis-Philippe de Grandpré was born in Montreal, Quebec, to Roland de Grandpré and Aline Magnan. He was one of three brothers, all of whom became gifted, popular lawyers. His brother Jean de Grandpré became Chairman of Bell Canada, and his brother Pierre practised for more than 45 years.

De Grandpré received a classical education at Collège Sainte-Marie de Montréal, graduating in 1935. He then studied law at McGill University and received a Bachelor of Civil Law in 1938.

De Grandpré was diagnosed with syringomyelia when he was 29, and from then on he was virtually paralyzed on the right side of his body.

== Early legal career ==
He practised law in Montreal from 1938 and, about eight years after his call to the bar, he co-founded the firm of Tansey, de Grandpré et de Grandpré.

From 1972 to 1973, he was president of the Canadian Bar Association, where he took a position opposing state-controlled legal aid plans.

== Supreme Court ==
De Grandpré was appointed to the Supreme Court of Canada on January 1, 1974. He was the subject of controversy that year when objections were raised to him hearing the case Morgentaler v The Queen given his prior personal statements about the issue at a 1973 national meeting of the Canadian Bar Association. In the end, the Chief Justice decided that de Grandpré could remain on the panel to hear the abortion case.

By October 1, 1977, de Grandpré resigned complaining of Chief Justice Bora Laskin's style of running the Court and the direction it was taking on many constitutional matters. In an interview near the end of his life, he said he found the work on the Court dead boring.

== Subsequent legal career ==
After leaving the bench, de Grandpré returned to the practice of law at the firm of Lafleur, Brown, de Grandpré (which later became Gowling Lafleur Henderson), and was seen as a mentor by many lawyers. In 1985, de Grandpré authored a report on judicial independence for the Canadian Bar Association.

== Honours and distinctions ==
- 1971: Companion of the Order of Canada
- 1998: Grand Officer of the National Order of Quebec
- 2007: Emeritus Lawyer of the Bar of Quebec

== Death ==
He died on January 24, 2008, in Saint-Lambert, leaving behind his wife, four children, eleven grandchildren and five great-grandchildren and a brother. The funeral service was held at Saint-Viateur d'Outremont and he was entombed at the Notre Dame des Neiges Cemetery in Montreal. His wife died in 2012.
