= John I. Laskin =

Canadian lawyer

John Ivan Laskin (born 1943) is a former justice of the Court of Appeal for Ontario from 1994 to 2018. He is a graduate of the University of Toronto Faculty of Law. Prior to the court he practised law for 23 years.

Laskin is son of former Chief Justice of Canada Bora Laskin. He is married to Crystal Witterick, a former partner at Blake, Cassels & Graydon LLP. Together, they have a daughter.
