= Yves Pratte =

Supreme Court of Canada judge (1925–1988)

The Honourable Yves Pratte

Puisne Justice of the Supreme Court of Canada
- In office 1 October 1977 – 30 June 1979
- Nominated by: Pierre Trudeau
- Preceded by: Louis-Philippe de Grandpre
- Succeeded by: Julien Chouinard

Personal details
- Born: 7 March 1925 Quebec City, Quebec
- Died: 26 June 1988 (aged 63)

Yves Pratte (7 March 1925 – 26 June 1988) was a Canadian lawyer and jurist who served briefly as a Puisne Justice of the Supreme Court of Canada.

== Early life ==
Born in Quebec City, Quebec, he was the son of Garon Pratte and G. Rivard. He was the father of Guy Pratte, a prominent lawyer who practises in both Ontario and Quebec, and André Pratte, editorial pages editor with Montreal's daily newspaper La Presse, and a fervent federalist voice in Quebec.

== Career ==
Pratte studied law at Université Laval and the University of Toronto. Following his admission to the bar in the province of Quebec in 1947, he practised law in Quebec City, established a successful law firm, and continued his association with Laval, becoming its Dean of Law from 1962–1965. Between 1965 and 1968, he served as special legal counsel to Quebec premiers Lesage and Johnson. From 1968–1974, he served as the chairman of Air Canada, which was then under the control of the Canadian National Railway, a Crown corporation. On 1 October 1977, he was appointed to the Supreme Court of Canada on the recommendation of Pierre Trudeau. His tenure on the court was brief – Pratte served less than two years before stepping down for health reasons. Upon his resignation on 30 June 1979, he returned to private practice, joining the Montreal firm of Courtois Clarkson.

== Death ==
Pratte died suddenly, of a heart attack, on 26 June 1988, in Montreal. His body was interred in the Cimetière Notre-Dame-de-Belmont, in Sainte-Foy, Quebec.

== Recognition ==
Today, the Yves Pratte Foundation named in his honour promotes student exchanges between the University of Toronto and Université Laval.

Legal offices
Preceded by Louis-Philippe de Grandpré	Puisne Justice of the Supreme Court of Canada; 1 October 1977 – 30 June 1979	Succeeded by Julien Chouinard
