= Julien Chouinard =

The Honourable Julien Chouinard OC CD

Puisne Justice of the Supreme Court of Canada
- In office September 24, 1979 – February 6, 1987
- Nominated by: Joe Clark
- Appointed by: Edward Schreyer
- Preceded by: Yves Pratte
- Succeeded by: Claire L'Heureux-Dubé

Personal details
- Born: February 4, 1929 Quebec City, Quebec, Canada
- Died: February 6, 1987 (aged 58)

Julien Chouinard, OC CD (February 4, 1929 – February 6, 1987) was a Canadian lawyer and civil servant who served as a puisne justice of the Supreme Court of Canada from 1979 to 1987. He was the sole Clark appointee to serve as a justice of the Supreme Court.

== Biography ==
Born in Quebec City, the son of Joseph Julien Chouinard and Berthe Cloutier, he received a BA in 1948 and a LL.L. in 1951 from Université Laval. As a Rhodes Scholar, he received a BA in 1953 from Oxford University. In 1953, he was called to the Quebec Bar and started to practise law. He also taught law at Université Laval. Auxiliary professor at Laval University from 1959 and, mid-time professor from 1964. Member of the lawyer cabinet Gagné, Prévost, Flynn.

In 1965, he joined the Quebec civil service as deputy minister of Justice. In 1968, he was appointed Secretary General of the Executive Council of Quebec. He ran unsuccessfully as the Progressive Conservative candidate for the House of Commons of Canada for the Quebec riding of Matane in the 1968 federal election. In recognition of his contribution to public service, he was made an Officer of the Order of Canada in 1974. In 1974, he was appointed to the Court of Appeal of Quebec. In 1979, Prime Minister Joe Clark appointed him to the Supreme Court, and he served until his death from brain cancer in 1987. He is buried in the Cimetière Notre-Dame-de-Belmont.

== See also ==
- 1987 judgments of the Supreme Court of Canada
