= Jean Beetz =

Supreme Court of Canada judge (1927–1991)

Jean Beetz CC
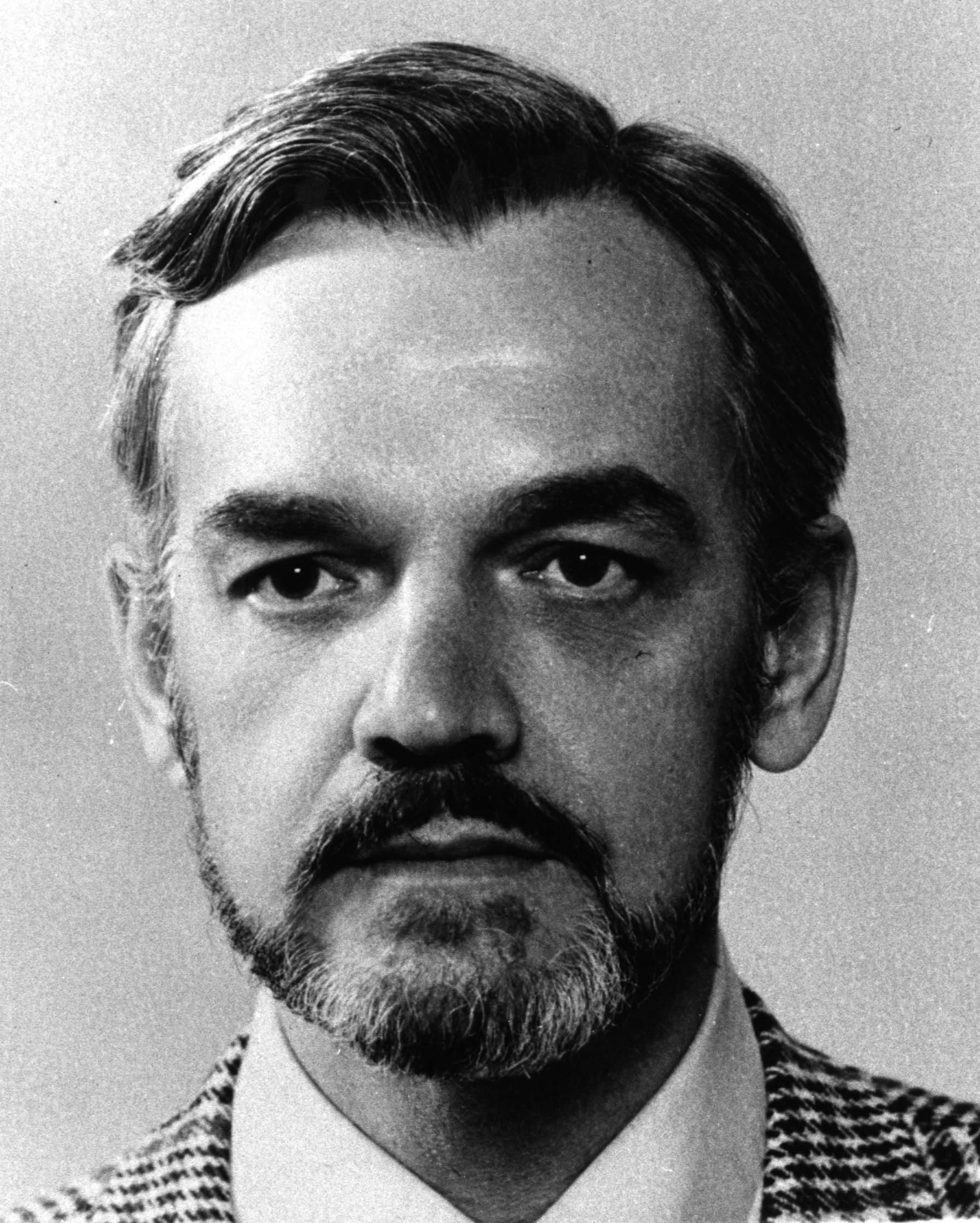

Puisne Justice of the Supreme Court of Canada
- In office January 1, 1974 – November 10, 1988
- Nominated by: Pierre Trudeau
- Preceded by: Bora Laskin
- Succeeded by: Charles Gonthier

Justice of the Quebec Court of Appeal
- In office 1973–1974
- Nominated by: Pierre Trudeau

Personal details
- Born: March 27, 1927 Montreal, Quebec
- Died: September 30, 1991 (aged 64)
- Education: Université de Montréal Faculty of Law; Pembroke College, Oxford
- Profession: Lawyer

Jean-Marie Philémon Joseph Beetz, CC, c.r. (March 27, 1927 – September 30, 1991) was a Canadian lawyer, academic and judge from Quebec. He served as a puisne justice of the Supreme Court of Canada from 1974 to 1988.

== Family and early life ==
Born in Montreal, Quebec, Beetz was the son of Jean Beetz and Jeanne Cousineau.

He was the grandson of Adéla Tanguay (1884-1954) and Johan Beetz (1874–1949), a Belgian physician, surgeon, naturalist, illustrator and businessmen.

Beetz earned a Bachelor of Arts degree in 1947 from the Université de Montréal and a Licentiate of Laws in 1950. He was awarded a Rhodes Scholarship and attended Pembroke College, Oxford, where he received Bachelor of Arts and Master of Arts degrees in 1953.

== Legal career ==
Beetz was called to the bar in Quebec before leaving for England on his Rhodes Scholarship. On his return to Canada in 1953, he became an assistant professor teaching Canadian constitutional law at the Université de Montréal. He taught there for twenty years, including serving as Dean of the Faculty of Law from 1968 to 1970. He had a reputation as a reflective and meticulous scholar and a wise and caring teacher. One of his colleagues on the Faculty of Law was Pierre Trudeau, later the federal Minister of Justice and then Prime Minister of Canada.

In addition to his academic work, Beetz also served in Ottawa from 1966 to 1971. He was the Assistant Secretary to the Cabinet and Assistant Clerk of the Privy Council. He then served as Prime Minister Trudeau's Special Counsel on Constitutional Affairs. In that position, he was deeply involved in the Victoria Charter constitutional reform process, which was a fore-runner to the patriation of the Constitution in 1982 and the adoption of the Canadian Charter of Rights and Freedoms.

== Judicial career ==
=== Appointments ===
In 1973, Prime Minister Trudeau appointed Beetz to the Quebec Court of Appeal. He served on that court for less than a year, being elevated to the Supreme Court of Canada on January 1, 1974.

=== Judgments ===
==== Approach to federalism ====
Beetz's areas of expertise were the civil law of Quebec, and Canadian constitutional law. Because his time on the Supreme Court coincided with major federal-provincial disputes on federalism issues, he took part in several major federalism decisions. More than anyone else on the Court at the time, he supported the provinces in the division of powers, taking the traditional Quebec interpretation for a decentralised federation. Since Chief Justice Laskin was a strong centralist, they usually took opposing views on federalism issues. James MacPherson, former Dean of Osgoode Hall Law School, has summarised the Beetz-Laskin debates: "The result was that constitutional lawyers, academics, and students were regularly treated to two scholarly, beautifully reasoned, and eloquent — but in the end — opposing judgments. Put simply, Professors Laskin and Beetz, as Chief Justice and Justice, elevated the level of discourse in Canadian constitutional law."

==== Reference re Anti-Inflation Act ====
One of Beetz's most significant decisions was his dissenting opinion in Reference re Anti-Inflation Act. The case concerned a federal statute which implemented wage and price controls during a time of high inflation. The issue was whether the federal Parliament had the authority to pass the Act, under the emergency branch of the federal peace, order and good government power. Beetz wrote a lengthy decision outlining the doctrinal basis for the emergency branch, and concluded that the Act did not meet the necessary strict test for federal legislation under this power. The other justices of the Court disagreed with his conclusion, and upheld the constitutional validity of the federal Act. However, they agreed with his interpretation of the emergency branch. As a result, Beetz's outline of the emergency branch is now the standard analysis. James MacPherson has stated that Beetz's opinion is "... the single best written judgment in a distribution of powers case in the history of Canadian constitutional law."

==== Patriation Reference ====
Beetz also participated in the 1981 Patriation Reference, which considered Prime Minister Pierre Trudeau's attempt to have the federal government unilaterally patriate the Constitution of Canada without the consent of the provinces. By a 7-2 division, a majority of the Court held that Parliament had the legal authority to act unilaterally. However, by a division of 6-3, the Court also held that unilateral federal action would violate a constitutional convention that had emerged since Confederation, requiring substantial provincial agreement on constitutional amendments.

Beetz, along with the other two judges from Quebec and Justice Dickson, was in the majority on both issues: he agreed that Parliament had the legal authority to act unilaterally, but also agreed that a constitutional convention required a substantive degree of provincial agreement for major constitutional amendments.

==== Partial list of judgments ====
- Reference re Anti-Inflation Act (1976) (dissent)
- Société des Acadiens v. Association of Parents (1986) (majority)
- Beauregard v. Canada (1986) (dissent)

== Later life ==
Beetz retired in 1988 due to ill health. In 1989 he was made a Companion of the Order of Canada, for his contribution to Canadian federalism, administrative, public, and civil law. In addition to his reputation as a judge, Beetz was also respected for his personal characteristics of warmth, humour and modesty. At a memorial service for Beetz, his former colleague, Chief Justice Lamer stated: "Jean, mon ami, pour le dire le plus simplement possible, était un homme bon" (Jean, my friend, to say it as simply as possible, was a good man).

Beetz died on September 30, 1991.

== See also ==
- 1987 judgments of the Supreme Court of Canada
- 1988 judgments of the Supreme Court of Canada
- 1989 judgments of the Supreme Court of Canada
