= Willard Estey =

Supreme Court of Canada judge (1919–2002)

Willard Estey CC

Puisne Justice of the Supreme Court of Canada
- In office September 29, 1977 – April 22, 1988
- Nominated by: Pierre Trudeau
- Preceded by: Wilfred Judson
- Succeeded by: John Sopinka

Personal details
- Born: Willard Zebedee Estey; October 10, 1919 Saskatoon, Saskatchewan
- Died: January 25, 2002 (aged 82)
- Relations: James Wilfred Estey, father
- Profession: Lawyer

Willard Zebedee "Bud" Estey CC (October 10, 1919 – January 25, 2002) was a Canadian justice of the Supreme Court of Canada.

Estey was born in Saskatoon, Saskatchewan. He was the son of James Wilfred Estey, a puisne justice of the Supreme Court of Canada, and Muriel Baldwin. He studied at the University of Saskatchewan earning a BA in 1940 and an LL.B in 1942. He joined the armed forces and fought during World War II, including acting as a Canadian Observer with US forces during the battle for Okinawa. Upon returning to Canada, Estey went to study at Harvard Law School and received a LL.M in 1946.

In 1946 he taught at the University of Saskatchewan, but moved to Ontario the following year to practise law. In 1973, he was appointed to the Court of Appeal for Ontario and two years later was named Chief Justice of the High Court of Justice of Ontario. He became Chief Justice of Ontario in 1976. He was appointed to the Supreme Court of Canada in 1977 to replace Wilfred Judson.

He drafted the first judgment of the Supreme Court on the Canadian Charter of Rights and Freedoms, Law Society of Upper Canada v. Skapinker, in 1984.

Estey was appointed a trustee of the Stanley Cup in 1984 on the nomination of Red Dutton, succeeding Clarence Campbell. In 1985, he was appointed as Commissioner of Inquiry into the collapses of the Canadian Commercial Bank and the Northland Bank, both of which had been closed by the Canadian government that year. His report, Report of the Inquiry into the Collapse of the CCB and Northland Bank, was issued in 1986.

Willard Estey retired from the Supreme Court of Canada in 1988.

== Honours ==
- In 1977 he was awarded an honorary Doctor of Laws from Wilfrid Laurier University.
- In 1979 he was awarded an honorary Doctor of Laws from University of Toronto.
- In 1984 he was awarded an honorary Doctor of Laws from the University of Saskatchewan.
- In 1990 he was made a Companion of the Order of Canada.

== Judgments ==
- Labatt Breweries v. Canada (Attorney General), [1980] 1 S.C.R. 914
- Multiple Access Ltd v McCutcheon [1982] 2 SCR 161
- Law Society of Upper Canada v. Skapinker, [1984] 1 S.C.R. 357
- R. v. Canadian Dredge & Dock Co. [1985] 1 S.C.R. 662

== See also ==
- 1987 judgments of the Supreme Court of Canada
- 1988 judgments of the Supreme Court of Canada

Academic offices
Preceded by Maureen Forrester	Chancellor of Wilfrid Laurier University; 1990–1995	Succeeded by John E. Cleghorn
Sporting positions
Preceded by Clarence Campbell	Stanley Cup Trustee; 1984–2002	Succeeded by Scotty Morrison
