= Bora Laskin =

Chief Justice of Canada from 1973 to 1984

The Right Honourable Bora Laskin PC CC FRSC

14th Chief Justice of Canada
- In office December 27, 1973 – March 26, 1984
- Nominated by: Pierre Trudeau
- Appointed by: Roland Michener
- Preceded by: Gérald Fauteux
- Succeeded by: Brian Dickson

Puisne Justice of the Supreme Court of Canada
- In office March 23, 1970 – December 27, 1973
- Nominated by: Pierre Trudeau
- Preceded by: Gérald Fauteux
- Succeeded by: Louis-Philippe de Grandpré

Justice of the Ontario Court of Appeal
- In office 1965–1970
- Nominated by: Lester B. Pearson

Personal details
- Born: October 5, 1912 Fort William, Ontario, Canada
- Died: March 26, 1984 (aged 71) Ottawa, Ontario, Canada
- Resting place: Holy Blossom Memorial Park, Toronto, Ontario, Canada
- Spouse: Peggy Tenenbaum
- Relations: Saul Laskin (brother); John B. Laskin (nephew)
- Children: John, Barbara
- Education: University of Toronto (BA, MA, LLB); Osgoode Hall Law School; Harvard Law School (LLM)
- Profession: Lawyer

Bora Laskin (October 5, 1912 – March 26, 1984) was a Canadian jurist who served as the 14th chief justice of Canada from 1973 to 1984 and as a puisne justice of the Supreme Court of Canada from 1970 to 1973. Before his Supreme Court service, he previously served on the Ontario Court of Appeal from 1965 to 1970. Prior to his appointment, Laskin worked as a lawyer and in academia.

== Early life and family ==
Laskin was born in Fort William, Ontario (now Thunder Bay), the son of Max Laskin and Bluma Zingel. His brother, Saul Laskin, went on to become the first mayor of Thunder Bay. His other brother, Charles, was a shirt designer and manufacturer.

Laskin married Peggy Tenenbaum. The couple had two children: John I. Laskin, who followed in his father's footsteps and became a judge at the Ontario Court of Appeal, and Barbara Laskin Plumptre. His grandson (the son of his daughter) carries on his name. His nephew John B. Laskin is a judge of the Federal Court of Appeal, having previously been a faculty member of the University of Toronto Faculty of Law and a prominent commercial litigator in Toronto.

== Education ==
Laskin was a graduate of Fort William Collegiate Institute. He studied at the University of Toronto, earning a Bachelor of Arts in 1933, a Master of Arts in 1935, and a Bachelor of Laws 1936. He was also educated as a lawyer at Osgoode Hall Law School. While at the University of Toronto, he was a member of Sigma Alpha Mu fraternity.

In 1937, he received a Master of Laws from Harvard Law School. He earned a gold medal at both the University of Toronto Law School and at Harvard Law School.

== Legal career ==
Despite his superior academic record, Laskin, who was Jewish, was unable to find work at any law firm of note, because of the antisemitism that pervaded the English-Canadian legal profession at the time. As a result, his first job after graduating was writing headnotes (i.e., article synopses) for the Canadian Abridgement, a legal research tool.

In order to be called to the bar, it was required that he serve articles with a lawyer who was already a member of the bar. He had trouble finding a lawyer who would serve as his principal, because non-Jewish lawyers would not accept Jewish students. Through connections, he eventually found a young Jewish lawyer, Sam Gotfrid, who was willing to sign as his principal, but Gotfrid was himself only just starting out and could not provide Laskin with any work or salary. A year into his articles, Laskin found a non-Jewish lawyer, W.C. Davidson, who was willing to take him as an articling student, and he finished his articles with Davidson. In later years, Laskin would say that he articled with Davidson, not mentioning his initial start with Gotfrid.

Ultimately, Laskin decided to pursue his career in academia. In 1940, he was hired by the University of Toronto (the post had initially been offered to John Kenneth Macalister, who turned it down in favour of serving in the military). Laskin taught at the University of Toronto until 1965 (except for the period 1945–1949, when he taught at Osgoode Hall Law School). For 23 years he was an associate editor of Dominion Law Reports and Canadian Criminal Cases. He also wrote Canadian Constitutional Law and other legal texts. His interests were in labour law, constitutional law, and human rights. He was a founding member of the Canadian Civil Liberties Association.

After appeals to the Privy Council were abolished, Ian Bushnell described Laskin as one of the few critics within the legal profession who had the "power and prestige" to criticize the Supreme Court aggressively. In 1950, Laskin described the Court as finally free but "subject only to self-imposed limitations." He encouraged the Court to break from those limitations and consider current social circumstances in its judgments.

=== Labour lawyer and arbitrator ===
Laskin's non-academic practice involved primarily the area of labour and employment law, where he was known to have a kind heart and worked to advance the rights of trade unions. His most significant contributions were as a grievance arbitrator, where he made one of the greatest contributions to labour jurisprudence, with many of the legal concepts he developed finding their way into the broader field of law, especially human rights law which in the early days grew largely out of disputes in the workplace.

Many of Laskin's decisions are still referenced as leading cases of Canadian labour law and the University of Toronto's Centre for the Study of Industrial Relations awards the Bora Laskin Award in Labour Law annually to two lawyers who have made an outstanding contributions to Canadian labour law (one to union-side and one to employer-side).

== Judicial career ==
=== Ontario Court of Appeal ===
Laskin's career on the bench began in 1965 with his appointment to the Ontario Court of Appeal. While on the Court of Appeal, Laskin gave a decision in a divorce case, upholding the constitutional authority of the federal Parliament to include the right to spousal support under the Divorce Act. Laskin held that spousal support was ancillary to Parliament's constitutional jurisdiction over divorce under the Constitution Act. When the Supreme Court of Canada considered the same issue three years later, it unanimously reached the same conclusion, citing Laskin's decision from the Ontario Court of Appeal.

=== Supreme Court of Canada ===
On March 19, 1970, he was appointed on the advice of Prime Minister Pierre Trudeau to the Supreme Court of Canada, becoming the first Jewish justice to sit on that court. Again on the advice of Trudeau, Laskin was appointed Chief Justice on December 27, 1973. He held that position until his death in 1984.

Laskin's appointment as Chief Justice generated some controversy. He was the second-most junior justice on the court, having served for only three years. The long-standing tradition was that on the retirement of the chief justice, the senior puisne justice on the court would be appointed. Since the establishment of the Supreme Court in 1875, this practice had been followed except on two occasions, in 1906 and 1924, when the senior puisne justices had been passed over. By that tradition, the appointment as Chief Justice would have gone to Justice Ronald Martland, who had been on the court for fifteen years. When Prime Minister Trudeau appointed Laskin, it was said that Justice Martland had been given very little notice that he would be passed over, and was upset by it. Minister of Finance John Turner was rumoured to be furious at the departure from the traditions of the court.

== Judgments ==
=== Judicial philosophy ===
Laskin was a liberal jurist who often found himself on the minority side of decisions. His specialty was labour law and constitutional law and he had a reputation as a civil libertarian.

On matters of federalism under the Constitution Act, 1867, Laskin has been considered the most aggressive supporter of the federal powers of any justice since Confederation. This made for a stark contrast with fellow Justice Jean Beetz, who was known as one of the strongest supporters of provincial powers under the Constitution.

In his earlier years on the Supreme Court, Laskin was frequently in dissent. During the 1970s, Laskin frequently joined with justices Wishart Spence and Brian Dickson on cases involving civil liberties, often in dissent from the more conservative majority on the court. The grouping was colloquially referred to as the "LSD connection."

Laskin often took a position that was later adopted by a majority of the court. Among his most famous dissents was his opinion in Murdoch v. Murdoch, where he was the sole judge who would have ruled in favour of a wife's application for an equal division of property acquired during the course of the marriage. The outcome of the case was highly controversial. It triggered reforms to matrimonial laws across the country, adopting Laskin's view of property equality between husband and wife. Years later, Laskin said that the position he took in this case was the likely cause of his promotion to Chief Justice over the more senior Ronald Martland.

=== The Patriation Reference ===
Laskin presided over a number of landmark constitutional cases, most notably the 1981 Patriation Reference, which considered Pierre Trudeau's attempt to have the federal government unilaterally patriate the Constitution of Canada without the consent of the provinces. The case was a consolidated appeal of three provincial references, from Quebec, Manitoba and Newfoundland. By a 7-2 division, a majority of the court held that Parliament had the legal authority to act unilaterally. However, by a division of 6–3, the court also held that unilateral federal action would violate a constitutional convention that had emerged since Confederation, requiring substantial provincial agreement on constitutional amendments. Laskin was one of the judges in the majority on the issue of Parliament's legal authority to act unilaterally, but was one of the three dissenting judges who would have held that there was no constitutional convention restricting Parliament's power to act unilaterally.

As a result of the decision in the Patriation Reference, Trudeau decided to begin a new round of negotiations with the provinces, which resulted in the patriation of the Constitution from Britain being agreed to by all provinces save Quebec. Historian Frederic Bastien suggests that Laskin may have violated the constitutional separation of powers by discussing the deliberations of the court with politicians, casting doubt on the legitimacy of the decision. However, surviving participants in the Reference process do not think that the allegations, even if true, undercut the validity of the court's decision. Other scholars said that the patriation process violated judicial independence.

== Death ==
Laskin was in poor health the last few years of his life, and died in office on March 26, 1984, at the age of 71 from pneumonia. Two weeks before his death, on March 13, 1984, he was made a Companion of the Order of Canada.

Prime Minister Trudeau offered a state funeral, but the family declined because Laskin "liked things very simple." Instead, Laskin lay in state in the Great Hall of the Supreme Court building, prior to a simple funeral ceremony in Ottawa and interment at Holy Blossom Memorial Park in Toronto. His brother Saul Laskin was later buried beside him.

== Recognition ==
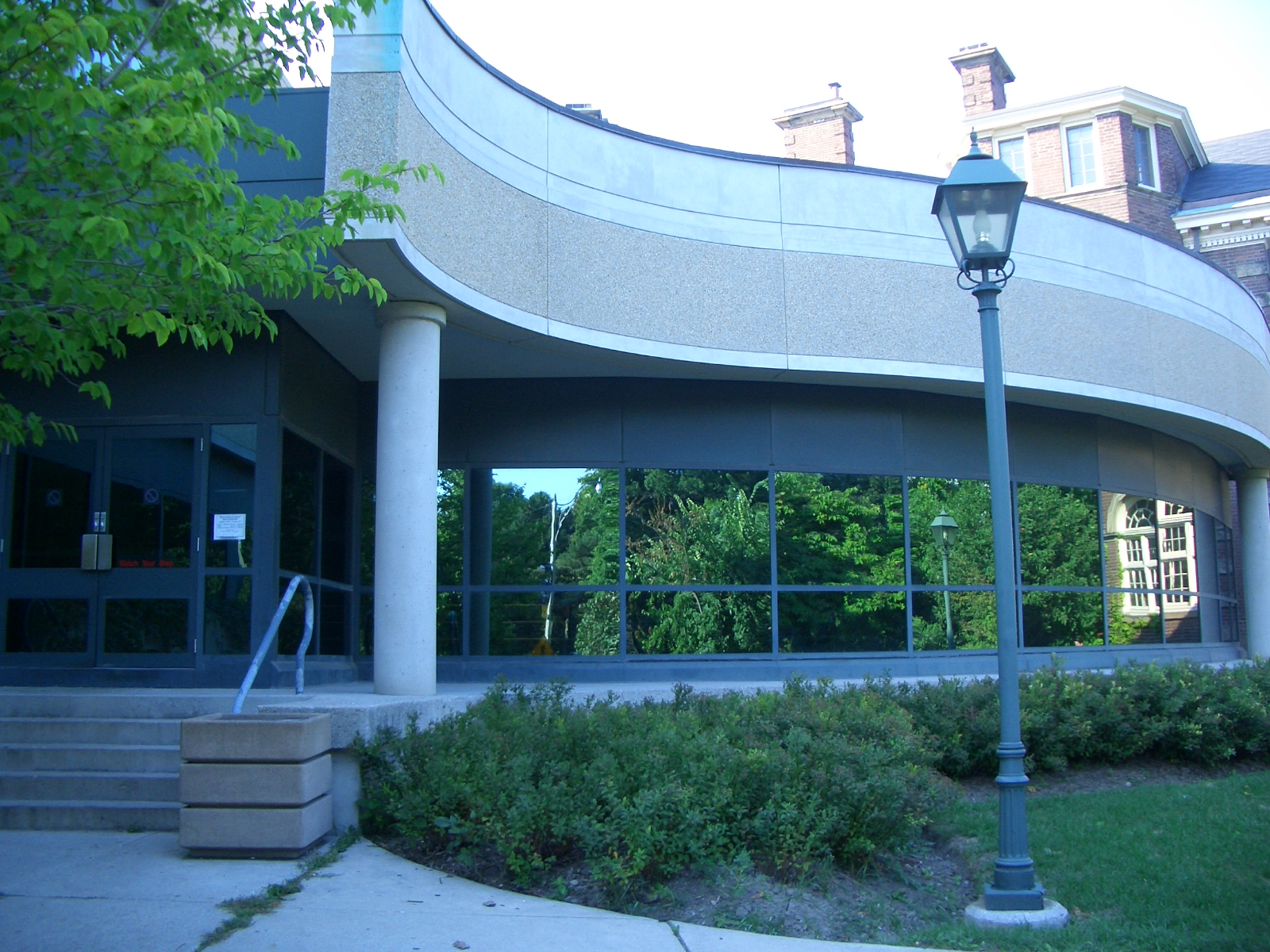
Bora Laskin Law Library at the University of Toronto

- Lakehead University, in Laskin's hometown of Thunder Bay, honoured him in several ways.
  - The Bora Laskin Building, used primarily by the Faculty of Education.
  - The Bora Laskin Faculty of Law, established 2013.
- The Laskin Moot was named in his honour.
- The main library of the University of Toronto Faculty of Law is named for Laskin.
- The Bora Laskin Law Society in Ottawa was named in his honour in 2011.
- Elected as a Fellow of the Royal Society of Canada in 1964, giving him the right to the post nominal letters "FRSC".

== Honorary degrees ==
Bora Laskin received honorary degrees from many Canadian and international universities, these include:

Country	Date	School	Degree
Ontario	1965	Queen's University	Doctor of Laws (LL.D)
Ontario	1967	Trent University	Doctor of Laws (LL.D)
Ontario	1968	University of Toronto	Doctor of Laws (LL.D)
New Brunswick	1968	University of New Brunswick	Doctor of Civil Law (DCL)
Ontario	September 1970	University of Windsor	Doctor of Civil Law (DCL)
Ontario	1971	Law Society of Upper Canada	Doctor of Laws (LL.D)
Nova Scotia	1971	Dalhousie University	Doctor of Laws (LL.D)
Ontario	2 June 1971	University of Western Ontario	Doctor of Civil Law (DCL)
Alberta	1972	University of Alberta	Doctor of Laws (LL.D)
Manitoba	1972	University of Manitoba	
Ontario	Spring 1972	York University	Doctor of Laws (LL.D)
Israel	1975	Hebrew University of Jerusalem	
British Columbia	1975	Simon Fraser University	Doctor of Laws (LL.D)
Ontario	May 1975	Ontario Institute for Studies in Education	
British Columbia	April 1976	University of Victoria	Doctor of Laws (LL.D)
Ontario	1978	Carleton University	Doctor of Laws (LL.D)
British Columbia	29 May 1981	University of British Columbia	Doctor of Laws (LL.D)
Ontario	1982	Lakehead University	Doctor of Letters (D.Litt.)
Italy	5 July 1983	University of Padova	Doctor of Political Science (Ph.D.)

== See also ==
- List of Supreme Court of Canada cases (Laskin Court)

== Sources ==
- Bushnell, Ian (1992). Captive Court: A Study of the Supreme Court of Canada. McGill-Queen's University Press. ISBN 978-0-7735-0851-4.
- Girard, Philip (2005). Bora Laskin: Bringing Law to Life. Osgoode Society for Canadian Legal History; University of Toronto Press. ISBN 978-1-4426-7152-2. OCLC 314201685.
- McCormick, Peter (1998). "Follow the Leader: Judicial Power and Judicial Leadership on the Laskin Court, 1973-1984". Queen's Law Journal. 24 (1): 237–278.
- Snell, James G.; Vaughan, Frederick (1985). The Supreme Court of Canada: History of the Institution. University of Toronto Press; Osgoode Society for Canadian Legal History. ISBN 0-8020-3417-9. OCLC 15520650.
- Swinton, Katherine E. (1990). The Supreme Court and Canadian federalism: the Laskin-Dickson years. Toronto: Carswell. ISBN 0-459-34761-6.
