= Rinfret Court =

Period of the Supreme Court of Canada from 1944 to 1954

Supreme Court of Canada
Rinfret Court
- Duff Court ← → Kerwin Court
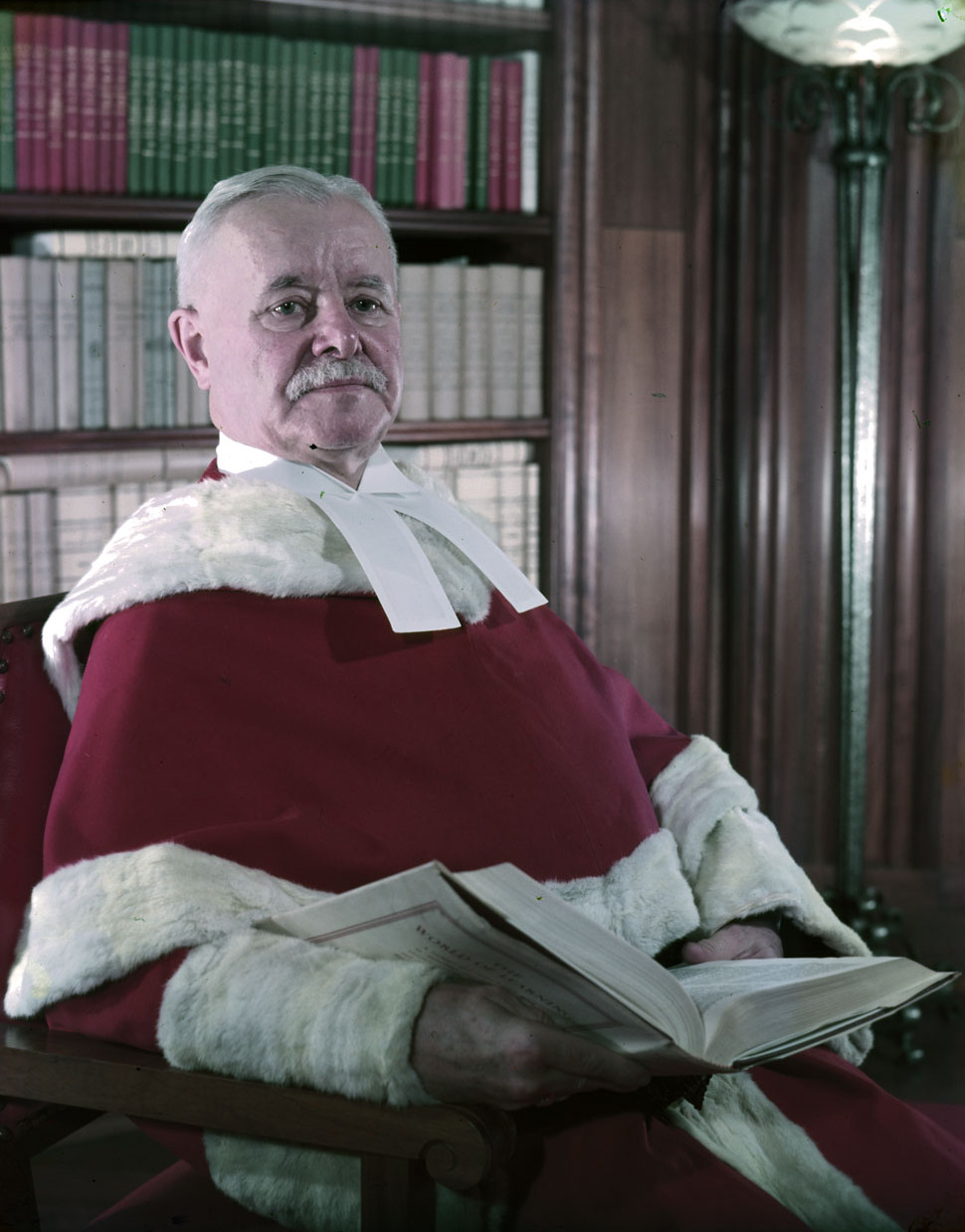
- Thibaudeau Rinfret
- January 8, 1944 – June 21, 1954 (10 years, 164 days)
- Seat: Second Supreme Court of Canada building (pre-1946); Supreme Court of Canada Building (post-1946)
- No. of positions: 7 (pre-1949); 9 (post-1950)

The Rinfret Court was the period in the history of the Supreme Court of Canada from 1944 to 1954, during which Thibaudeau Rinfret served as Chief Justice of Canada. Rinfret succeeded Lyman Duff as Chief Justice following Duff's resignation, and remained in office until his own resignation on June 21, 1954.

The Rinfret Court coincided with the 1949 abolition of appeals to the Judicial Committee of the Privy Council, which had served as Canada's highest court of appeal and whose decisions in Canadian appeals bound all Canadian courts. The period of the Rinfret Court coincided with increasing criticism of the Privy Council and a growing favourable public awareness of the Supreme Court. Although the appeal was abolished in 1949, parties whose proceedings had begun before abolition could still seek leave to appeal to the Privy Council. The Privy Council issued its final decision in a Canadian appeal in 1959.

During this period, the Court wavered between judicial conservatism, which continued its role under the Privy Council, and a more liberal approach that recognized and protected civil liberties in cases such as R v Boucher (1950), and Saumur v Quebec (1953).

== Membership ==
Under the Supreme Court Act, the Court was composed of seven justices, two of whom were allocated to Quebec under law, in recognition of the province's unique civil law system. (Note: The Supreme and Exchequer Court Act, S.C. 1875, c. 11 (The Supreme and Exchequer Court Act at Canadiana)) Other appointments reflected an unwritten regional balance, with two justices from Ontario, two justices from Western Canada, and one justice from the Maritimes. In 1949, the Supreme Court was expanded to nine justices, with a requirement for three to be appointed from Quebec. The last position was allocated to Ontario under the unwritten regional balance convention. (Note: An Act to Amend the Supreme Court Act, S.C. 1949, c. 37, s. 1)

=== Appointment of Chief Justice Rinfret ===
Chief Justice Lyman Duff retired on January 7, 1944, after 37 years on the bench. The next day, Prime Minister Mackenzie King appointed Thibaudeau Rinfret the ninth Chief Justice of Canada. Rinfret's selection generated little internal government controversy. Originally appointed to the Court in 1924, he was its senior puisne justice. He was also French-Canadian, a factor that could help reduce ethnic tensions that had grown during the Second World War. Although rumours circulated that James Ralston, King's Minister of National Defence, was interested in the position, Snell and Vaughan note that King was unwilling to interfere with his cabinet by appointing Ralston to the Court.

King nevertheless had reservations about Rinfret. In his diary, he expressed concern about Rinfret's age and frailty and did not expect him to remain Chief Justice for long. Rinfret was 64 years old when appointed.

=== Membership of the Court ===
Justices from the Duff Court who continued into the Rinfret Court included Henry Hague Davis and Patrick Kerwin of Ontario, Albert Hudson of Manitoba, Robert Taschereau of Quebec, and Ivan Rand of New Brunswick.

On October 3, 1944, Prime Minister William Lyon Mackenzie King appointed Roy Kellock of Ontario to the Court at the age of 50, filling the vacancy created by the death of Henry Hague Davis. Kellock was called to the bar in 1920, practised in private law in Toronto as litigation counsel, and was appointed to the Ontario Court of Appeal two years earlier in 1942.

On October 6, 1944, Prime Minister King appointed James Wilfred Estey of Saskatchewan to the Court at the age of 54, filling the western Canadian vacancy created by the retirement of Lyman Duff. Estey was educated at the University of New Brunswick and Harvard Law School, and moved to Saskatchewan in 1915. He taught economics and law at the University of Saskatchewan for 10 years, was called to the bar in 1917, and later held several litigation-related positions, including roles in private practice, as assistant to the local Crown attorney, and as local agent for the provincial attorney general. Estey was elected to the Legislative Assembly of Saskatchewan as a Liberal in 1934 and served in cabinet as Minister of Education and Attorney General in the Gardiner and Patterson governments. Snell and Vaughan note that Estey's appointment followed King's patronage blueprint for Court appointments, prior judicial experience was not required, while service to the Liberal Party and influential political connections were important factors.

The western vacancy filled by Estey was contested by representatives from British Columbia, Alberta, and Saskatchewan. Calls from British Columbia were largely ignored because Duff had represented that province on the Court for over 37 years. Senator Aristide Blais led the Alberta campaign, writing personally to King that Alberta had never had a Supreme Court justice and pointing to the province's growing population and economic importance. Senator Blais appealed to King's "sense of equity...to correct a situation which puts Alberta in a condition of inferiority among the other provinces." The consensus Alberta candidate was Supreme Court of Alberta justice Frank C. Ford. However, Alberta lacked the same influence in King's cabinet and the Liberal Party as Saskatchewan. Minister of Agriculture James Garfield Gardiner led the Saskatchewan campaign with other members of parliament, and proposed Estey, Thomas Clayton Davis, and Chief Justice of Saskatchewan William Melville Martin.

On June 3, 1947, Prime Minister King appointed Charles Holland Locke of British Columbia to the Court at the age of 59, filling the vacancy created by Albert Hudson's death on January 6, 1947. He was called to the bar in 1910 in Manitoba, and moved to Vancouver in 1928 where he was active in the provincial bar and the Progressive Conservative party. Locke was the last member of the Court to have read law rather than receive legal training at a university. King struggled to find a qualified candidate for the position, having offered the position to Sherwood Lett, and others who declined. King also considered appointing Louis St. Laurent and James Lorimer Ilsley despite not being from Western Canada.

On December 22, 1949, Prime Minister St. Laurent appointed John Robert Cartwright of Ontario to the Court at the age of 54, filling one of the newly created positions on the Court. He served in the First World War as an aide-de-camp to three generals. He was called to the bar in 1920 and practised in Toronto. He also served as government counsel to the Royal Commission on Spying Activities in Canada. Cartwright had no judicial experience when appointed, but was a highly respected lawyer and bencher on the Law Society of Upper Canada.

On December 22, 1949, Prime Minister St. Laurent appointed Gérald Fauteux of Quebec to the Court at the age of 49, filling one of the newly created positions on the Court. He studied at the Université de Montréal and practised in Montreal with his uncle Honoré Mercier Jr.. From 1929 to 1936, he was Crown Prosecutor for Montreal, and in 1939 he became Chief Crown Prosecutor of the province of Quebec. In 1947 he was appointed to the Quebec Superior Court.

=== Retirement of Chief Justice Rinfret ===
On June 21, 1954, Chief Justice Rinfret reached the mandatory retirement age of 75 and stepped down from the Supreme Court. Prime Minister Louis St. Laurent appointed Patrick Kerwin, the senior puisne justice, as the next Chief Justice of Canada on July 1, 1954. This appointment came after consultation with former Chief Justice Lyman Duff. Justice Rinfret's Quebec seat on the Court was filled by St. Laurent cabinet member Douglas Abbott.

=== Timeline ===
Bar key:
King appointee Bennett appointee St. Laurent appointee

== Other branches of government ==
The Rinfret Court began during the 19th Canadian Parliament, under a majority government led by Liberal Party, led by former Prime Minister William Lyon Mackenzie King.

The Court's tenure overlapped with three general elections. In the 1945 election, King's Liberals was elected to another majority government. King stepped down in 1948 and Louis St. Laurent took over the Liberal Party and became Prime Minister. St. Laurent secured a majority government in the 1949 election; and a weaker majority in the 1953 election.

== Relationship with the Judicial Committee of the Privy Council ==
From 1867 to 1949, the Judicial Committee of the Privy Council served as the highest court of appeal in Canada, and its decisions on Canadian appeals were binding on all Canadian courts. After the creation of the Supreme Court of Canada, parties could still—if both consented—appeal directly from a provincial court of appeal to the Judicial Committee, bypassing the Supreme Court. This became common practice. By 1900, the Privy Council had become dominant in Canadian jurisprudence, often deciding cases with "little or no restraint or respect" for the decisions of the Canadian courts from which the appeals originated. Between 1895 and 1954, there was always at least one Canadian on the Privy Council, all of whom were appointed from the Supreme Court. Snell and Vaughan note that Canadian membership on the Privy Council was only significant for tightening the legal and judicial structure of the British Empire and making its authority over Canada more palatable to Canadians.

Growing nationalist sentiment following the First World War into the 1930s increased public support for abolishing appeals to the Privy Council. Proponents of the appeal noted the intellectual strength of the Privy Council and its neutral position on contentious Canadian issues. Critics such as Frank Scott criticized the Privy Council for being "ignorant of the Canadian environment," and his study noted that the Supreme Court gave similar and even favourable treatment to minority groups compared to the Privy Council. In 1939, Conservative Member of Parliament Charles Cahan introduced a private members bill to abolish appeals to the Privy Council. Justice Minister Ernest Lapointe referred the bill to the Supreme Court, which held by a 4–2 decision that Parliament had the authority to abolish the appeal, with each justice writing individual reasons. (Note: Reference as to the Legislative Competence of the Parliament of Canada to Enact Bill No. 9 of the Fourth Session, Eighteenth Parliament of Canada, Entitled "An Act to Amend the Supreme Court Act", 1940 CanLII 64, (1940) SCR 49 (19 January 1940), Supreme Court (Canada)) The Second World War delayed the appeal to the Privy Council until 1946. Lord Jowitt largely relied on the reasons of Chief Justice Duff that abolishing the appeal was an element of self-government under the Statute of Westminster 1931, in holding that Parliament had the authority to terminate the appeal. (Note: The Attorney-General of Ontario and others v The Attorney-General of Canada and others and The Attorney-General of Quebec (Canada) [1947] UKPC 1, [1947] AC 127, 1947 CanLII 301 (13 January 1947), P.C. (on appeal from Canada))

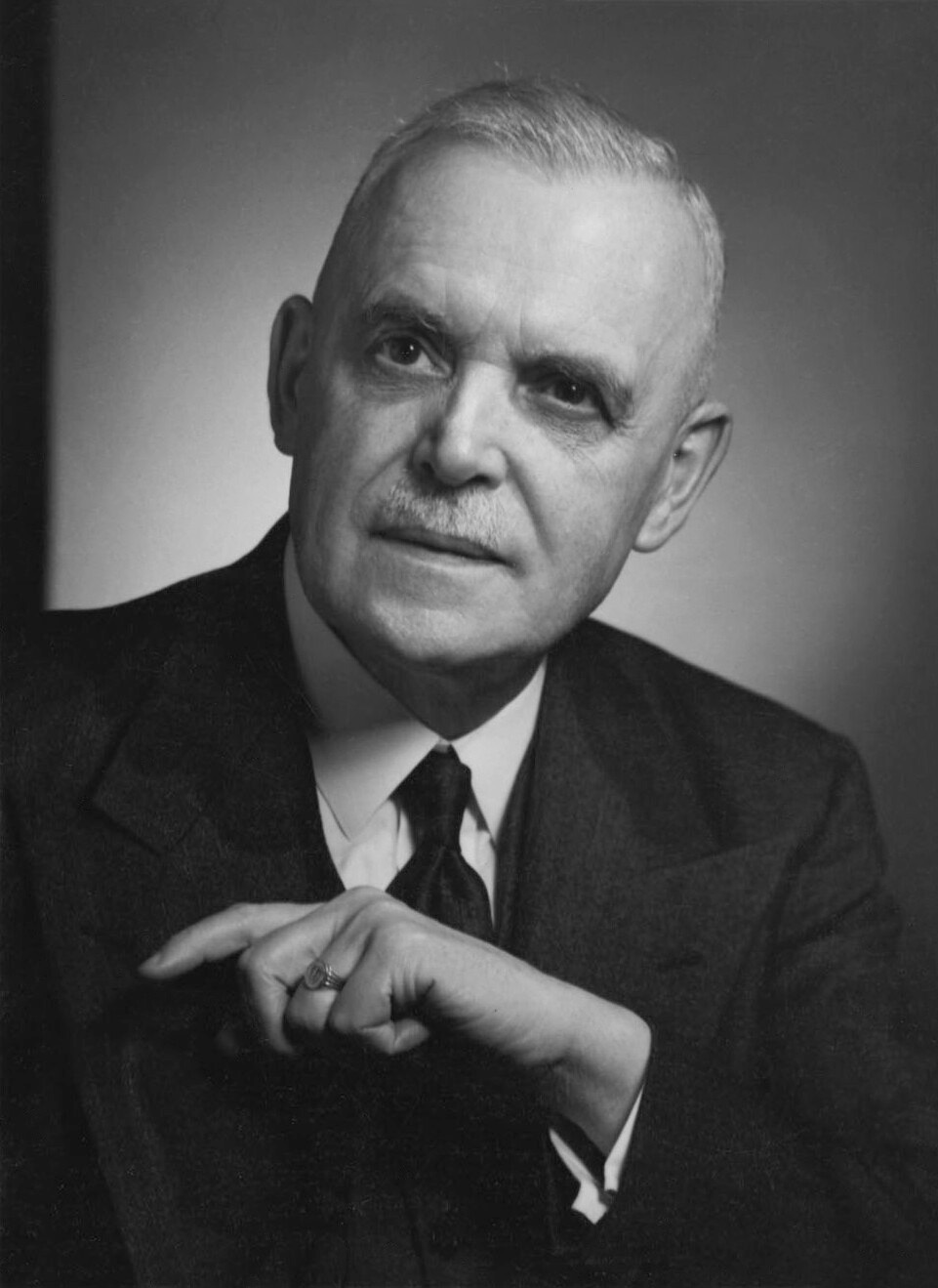
The appeal to the Privy Council was abolished shortly after Louis St. Laurent became Prime Minister of Canada.

Termination of appeals to the Judicial Committee of the Privy Council took considerable time. The issue coincided with 1945 negotiations between the federal government and the provinces over social security and taxation. Snell and Vaughan note that the delay likely reflected a desire to avoid provoking the provincial governments during those negotiations. Despite the desire to abolish the appeal, Chief Justice Rinfret was appointed to the Privy Council in 1947, following established practice. King's cabinet and the Liberal Party had little unity on the issue. Justice Minister James Lorimer Ilsley supported termination, while King worried that abolition would alienate Anglo-Canadians. St. Laurent did not believe Quebec Liberals would support abolishing appeals on constitutional questions involving the division of powers. King put the issue before the Liberal convention in August 1948, which adopted a resolution supporting complete termination. King retired, and Liberal leader St. Laurent pledged to abolish the appeal after the 1949 election. Parliament later passed legislation abolishing appeals to the Privy Council and denying any appeal based on the royal prerogative or any United Kingdom statute, which received royal assent on December 10, 1949. (Note: An Act to Amend the Supreme Court Act, S.C. 1949, c. 37)

- Reference Re Persons of Japanese Race (1946): on the constitutionality of deportation orders for Canadian citizens of Japanese descent. In a 5–2 decision, the Supreme Court upheld the validity of the deportation orders, except those applying to the wives and children of deportees. (Note: Reference to the Validity of Orders in Council in relation to Persons of Japanese Race, 1946 CanLII 46, [1946] SCR 248 (20 February 1946), Supreme Court (Canada)) At the Privy Council, Lord Wright held that the entire scheme was valid for the reasons given by Justices Rinfret, Kerwin, and Taschereau. (Note: The Co-operative Committee on Japanese Canadians and another v The Attorney-General of Canada and another (Canada) [1946] UKPC 48, [1947] AC 87, 1946 CanLII 361 (2 December 1946), P.C. (on appeal from Canada))
- Margarine Reference (1949): on the definition of criminal law under the Section 91(27) of the British North America Act, 1867. In a 5–2 decision, the Supreme Court struck down legislation prohibiting the manufacture and sale of butter substitutes. (Note: Reference re Validity of Section 5(a) Dairy Industry Act, 1948 CanLII 2, [1949] SCR 1 (14 December 1948)) The Privy Council upheld the Supreme Court's decision, with Lord Morton holding that the legislation was intended to protect and encourage the dairy industry and therefore did not constitute valid criminal law. (Note: The Canadian Federation of Agriculture v The Attorney-General of Quebec and others [1950] UKPC 31, [1951] AC 179, 1950 CanLII 342 (16 October 1950), P.C. (on appeal from Canada))
- Canadian Wheat Board v Manitoba Pool Elevators (1950): on the validity of a price-setting mechanism and compulsory acquisition by Order in Council. In a 5–2 decision, the Supreme Court held that the Order in Council was invalid because it was not directly authorized by the statute. (Note: Canadian Wheat Board v Nolan et al, 1950 CanLII 47, [1951] SCR 81 (20 November 1950), Supreme Court (Canada)) At the Privy Council, Lord Radcliffe held that the Order in Council was valid because the statute clearly and unambiguously conferred the necessary authority. Lord Radcliffe cautioned that courts should exercise restraint in determining the purpose of legislation, holding that the proper question was whether the statutory language authorized the exercise of the power. (Note: Canadian Wheat Board v. Manitoba Pool Elevators [1952] UKPC 336, [1952] AC 427, 1952 CanLII 336 (20 May 1952), P.C. (on appeal from Canada))
- Canada Steamship Lines Ltd v R (1952): on Canadian contract law and unfair terms contra proferentem. (Note: Canada Steamship Lines Limited v The King (Canada) [1952] UKPC 1, [1952] AC 192, 1952 CanLII 260 (21 January 1952), P.C. (on appeal from Canada))

== Rulings of the Court ==
The Supreme Court heard between 45 and 72 cases per year between 1944 and 1948. Below is a selection of rulings of the Rinfret Court.

- Frey v Fedoruk (1950): on breach of the peace and whether voyeurism is a criminal offence. Justice Cartwright writing for the majority held that conduct amounting to that of a "peeping tom" was not an offence under the Criminal Code and that the courts could not interpret breach of the peace to create new criminal offences. The Criminal Code did not justify an arrest where the officer knew the true facts but mistakenly treated non-criminal conduct as criminal. (Note: Frey v Fedoruk et al, 1950 CanLII 24, [1950] SCR 517, Supreme Court (Canada))
- Noble v Alley (1950): on the validity of a restrictive covenant prohibiting the sale of land based on race. In a 6–1 decision, the Court held the covenant was invalid. The majority relied on Tulk v. Moxhay for the principle that a restrictive covenant must run with the land. Justice Locke dissented on the procedural ground that reliance on Tulk v. Moxhay raised a new argument on appeal that had been rejected by the Ontario Court of Appeal. (Note: Noble et al v Alley, 1950 CanLII 13, [1951] SCR 64, Supreme Court (Canada))
- R v Boucher (1951): on seditious libel in the distribution of religious pamphlets. At the first hearing, three justices ordered a new trial because of misdirection of the jury, while Justices Rand and Estey dissented, holding that the contents of the pamphlets could not support a conviction. (Note: Boucher v The King, 1949 CanLII 334, [1950] 1 DLR 657, Supreme Court (Canada)) The Court failed to establish a clear definition of seditious libel. On rehearing, 5–4 majority acquitted Boucher. In interpreting seditious libel, an 8–1 majority rejected the view that an intention to promote ill will and hostility between classes of people was sufficient, instead requiring an intention to produce disorder or violence in relation to the governance of society. (Note: Boucher v The King, 1950 CanLII 2, [1951] SCR 265, Supreme Court (Canada))
- Johannesson v West St Paul (Rural Municipality of) (1951): on jurisdiction over aeronautics. The Court held that aeronautics is exclusively within federal jurisdiction as a distinct matter of national importance. Justices Kerwin and Kellock discussed the modern scope of the peace, order and good government power. (Note: Johannesson v West St Paul (Rural Municipality of), 1951 CanLII 55, [1952] 1 SCR 292, Supreme Court (Canada))
- Azoulay v The Queen (1952): on the role of a trial judge in instructing a jury in a criminal case. A physician was charged with murder after a patient died, and postmortem circumstantial evidence indicated an attempted abortion. In a 3–2 decision, the Court held that where technical evidence is complex, the trial judge should summarize it for the jury. (Note: Azoulay v The Queen, 1952 CanLII 4, [1952] 2 SCR 495, Supreme Court (Canada))
- Saumur v Quebec (City of) (1953): on constitutional validity of a by-law restricting freedom of expression. In a 5–4 decision, the Court held that a by-law prohibiting the distribution of written materials on city streets without police permission was ultra vires. Four justices found the by-law ultra vires under the division of powers. Justices Rand, Kellock, and Locke held that its purpose was censorship, while Justice Estey concluded that it infringed freedom of religion. Justice Kerwin held that the by-law fell within municipal jurisdiction but was inconsistent with a provincial statute protecting freedom of worship. The three Quebec justices dissented finding the bylaw valid. (Note: Saumur v Quebec (City of), 1953 CanLII 3, [1953] 2 SCR 299, Supreme Court (Canada))

== Administration of the Court ==
The Court operated with a panel of seven judges and a quorum of four until 1949, when Parliament expanded the Court to nine justices including three from Quebec. Justices were eligible to serve until the mandatory retirement age of 75. Under the Supreme Court Act, the Court held three sessions per year. If the Court could not meet quorum, the Chief Justice could appoint an ad hoc judge from the Exchequer Court or from among the provincial chief justices. The expansion to nine justices was partly a response to the Court's increasing reliance on ad hoc judges. Former Chief Justice Duff observed that ad hoc judges "rarely adopted an attitude of full responsibility" and detracted from solidarity on the Court.

During the late 1940s, after appeals to the Judicial Committee of the Privy Council were abolished, there was considerable debate over reforming the Supreme Court. Several proposals were rejected, including appointing the two new justices "at large" without regard to geography, using the Senate as a confirmation process similar to that in the United States, and selecting appointees from short lists prepared by provincial governments. Officials also considered entrenching the Court in the British North America Act, 1867, but dropped the proposal because changing social needs and circumstances might require amendments to the Supreme Court Act without the added complexity of the constitutional amendments. Minister of Finance Douglas Abbott, later appointed to the Supreme Court in a Quebec seat, suggested reserving one of Quebec's three seats on the Court for an anglophone to represent Quebec's English-speaking minority. St. Laurent rejected the suggestion. He understood the appointment convention as requiring at least three French-speaking members of the Court and considered Abbott's proposal a drastic change.

The Court recognized the right of applicants from Quebec to use either English or French. While French-language materials were accepted, they were translated into English at the Court's expense. The Supreme Court Act required the Court to publish its own decisions rather than relying on private law reporters. Judgments published in the Supreme Court Reports were printed in the language in which they were delivered and were not translated.

=== Costs and salaries of the Court ===
The cost of operating the Supreme Court steadily increased—from $54,530 in 1880 (equivalent to $1,873,577 in 2025), to $60,840 in 1890 (equivalent to $2,308,049 in 2025), $66,087 in 1900 (equivalent to $2,657,203 in 2025), to $150,000 in 1930 (equivalent to $2,706,593 in 2025).

Similarly salaries of the justices grew from $7,000 (equivalent to $240,511 in 2025), with the Chief Justice receiving an additional $1,000 in the 1880s, to $9,000 (equivalent to $301,469 in 2025), with an additional $1,000 for the Chief Justice in 1906; finally to $12,000 (equivalent to $172,842 in 2025), with an additional $3,000 for the Chief Justice in 1920. However, they remained among the lowest paid in comparison with their counterparts in other common law jurisdictions. In 1944, salaries were raised to

In 1944, the government raised the salary of a justice to $16,000 (equivalent to $288,703 in 2025), with an additional $4,000 for the Chief Justice; and made the justices pensions transferable to their widows. Another boost came in 1949, raising the salary of a justice to $20,000 (equivalent to $269,180 in 2025), with an additional $5,000 for the Chief Justice. These salaries were still not competitive for leading lawyers in major urban centers.

=== Growing political role of the Court ===
Snell and Vaughan note that in the Court's early decades, close connections and political involvement between the justices and the government were common and encouraged, and were not regarded as inappropriate. By 1920, the idea among political actors that the Supreme Court could serve as a useful political instrument had become well established.

Prime Minister R.B. Bennett's appointments showed considerable care, with little evidence of direct political influence in appointments, apart from Oswald Smith Crocket. Bennett continued the traditions of balancing regional and religious appointments.

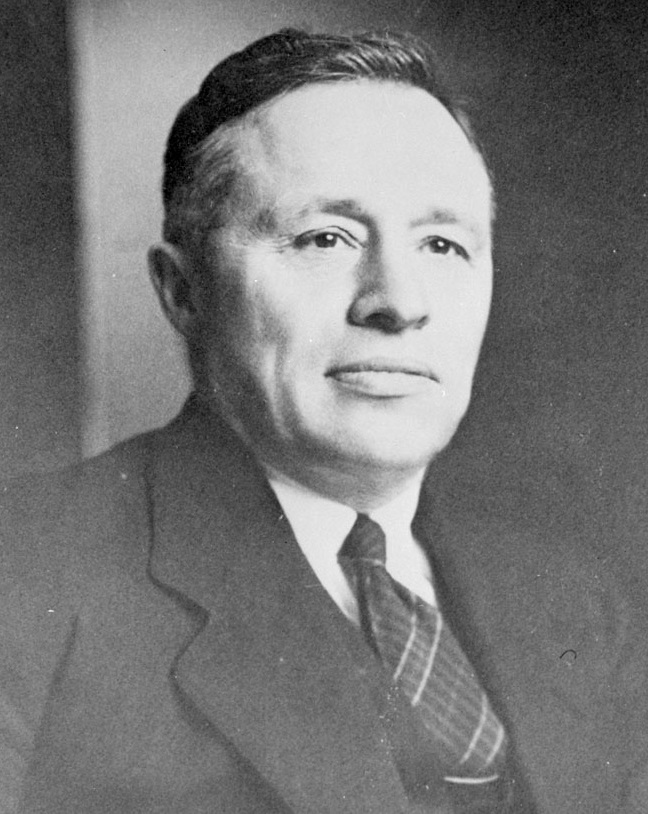
As Minister of Agriculture, James Garfield Gardiner was instrumental in the appointment of James Wilfred Estey to the Court. Estey was Minister of Education during Gardiner's premiership in Saskatchewan.

Prime Minister William Lyon Mackenzie King's appointments after his return to office in 1935 gave substantial weight to candidates who had served the Liberal Party or had influential Liberal backers. King showed little preference for prior judicial experience or legal reputation. James Wilfred Estey, a former Liberal attorney general of Saskatchewan, was appointed shortly after his electoral defeat with the support of Minister of Agriculture James Garfield Gardiner. King also considered appointing Louis St. Laurent and James Lorimer Ilsley to the Court as rewards for their years of political service. To make room for these appointments, King considered expanding the Court or removing Justice Rand, one of its strongest legal minds.

Snell and Vaughan describe Prime Minister Louis St. Laurent's appointments as showing an "apparent recognition of the Court's new status" after appeals to the Judicial Committee of the Privy Council were abolished. St. Laurent and his successor, John Diefenbaker, primarily considered regional balance and candidates who demonstrated traditional legal conservatism. Snell and Vaughan criticize these appointments for limiting the development of a distinctly Canadian legal path and entrenching the conservative jurisprudence of the Privy Council.

=== Expansion of duties of justices ===
Beginning in the late 1890s, Supreme Court justices increasingly accepted additional roles at the government's request, reflecting both the Court's growing stature and its deeper involvement in public affairs beyond the bench. These political and quasi-judicial roles reflected a gradual increase in respect for the Court, but also reinforced the view that the Court was a political tool rather than an institution separate from government.

In 1946, Justices Taschereau and Kellock were appointed to the Royal Commission on Espionage after the defection of Soviet GRU cipher clerk Igor Gouzenko. The Commission operated in secret and held its hearings in camera. Although it was not a court, its procedures violated several legal norms and restricted the civil liberties of suspects. Individuals were arrested and detained without charges, placed in solitary confinement, and denied access to counsel and habeas corpus. Taschereau and Kellock were given powers to detain individuals and deny them the right to counsel, which was exercised against 12 individuals.

In 1945, Justice Kellock was appointed to lead the inquiry into the Halifax riot that occurred at the end of the Second World War in Europe. In 1949, he led the inquiry into the fire that destroyed the passenger ship SS Noronic, which caused at least 118 deaths. Justice Fauteux served on the 1949 Royal Commission on the Revision of the Criminal Code, which abolished all common law offences except contempt of court, as well as offences created by the British Parliament or by statutes or ordinances in force in a territory before it became part of Canada. He also served on the 1953 Committee of Inquiry into the Remissions Branch, which led to the creation of the Parole Board of Canada.

The justices also participated in labour arbitration. Justice Rand served as arbitrator in the 1945 Windsor Ford strike, where he established the "Rand Formula," which required non-union employees to pay union dues without joining the union. In 1941, Justice Kerwin served on two boards dealing with railway employee relations. Justice Kellock chaired the 1952 Federal Conciliation Board during disputes between management and the non-operating railway unions.

In 1947, Justice Rand was appointed as Canada's representative to the United Nations Special Committee on Palestine.

=== Supreme Court building ===
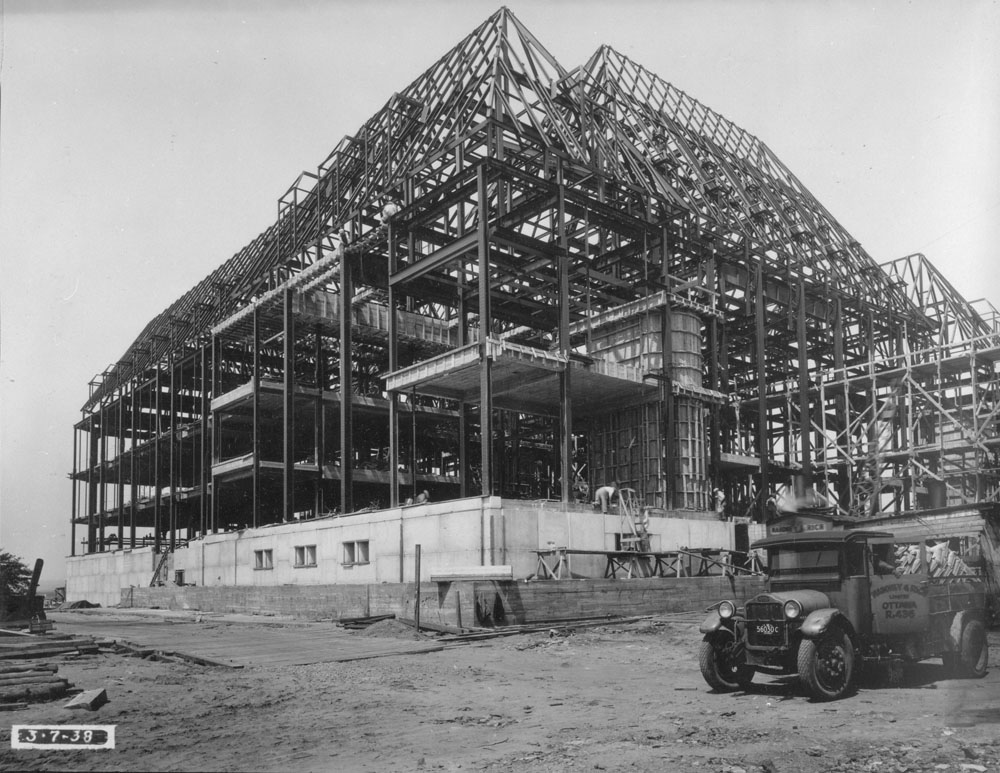
Supreme Court of Canada Building under construction in 1938.

The Supreme Court of Canada moved into its second building in 1882, a refurbished workshop and stable building. A 1936 article in Maclean's contrasted the building with the stature of the institution, noting "the shoddy little [Supreme Court] building cannot rob the institution of that peculiar reverence one automatically feels." The Court made various pleas to the government over 50 years to construct a suitable building, but these requests were largely ignored. While serving as minister of justice, both David Mills and Charles Fitzpatrick advocated for a new building without success. Minor improvements were made in 1906, including the installation of plumbing, shelving, lighting, and a one-storey extension to the Court's library. The Bennett government began examining potential sites and costs for a new building, but significant progress did not occur until Mackenzie King's return to office in 1935.

A subsequent inspection recommended that the existing building be condemned. The report identified numerous problems, including fire hazards, deteriorating structures, cramped quarters, and poor sanitary conditions. The washroom facilities were criticized; the women's washroom was described as "toilet for the women consists of one bowl placed in a dark corner underneath the stairway. It should be condemned forthwith." The justices' offices were also described as "thoroughly inadequate and injurious to the health of the occupants." Justice Minister Ernest Lapointe recommended the construction of a new building, a proposal supported by Prime Minister King and later approved by Parliament.

Architect Ernest Cormier was selected to design the project and began consulting with the government, bar associations, the Court and Chief Justice Duff. The design was finalized and construction began in 1938, and Queen Elizabeth the Queen Mother laid the cornerstone in May 1939. The new building was completed in 1941 but was used by government departments during the Second World War. In January 1946, the Supreme Court of Canada moved into the building.

=== Relationships of the justices ===
A rift began to grow between Justices Cartwright and Fauteux. Cartwright, a former defence counsel, often relied on mens rea and criminal intent in criminal appeals. Fauteux, a former Crown prosecutor, avoided discussing mens rea when possible.

== Legal philosophy of the Court ==
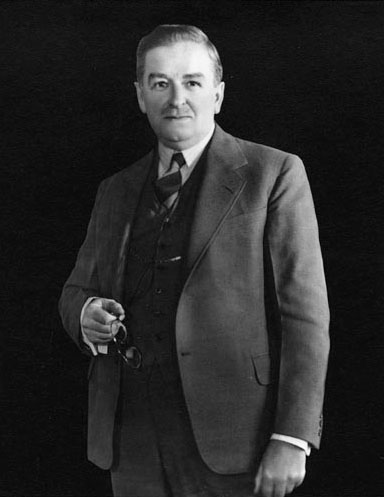
The Supreme Court heard several cases arising from government-sanctioned discrimination against Jehovah's Witnesses by Maurice Duplessis's government in Quebec.

The Rinfret Court began showing limited change in judicial philosophy from conservatism to a Canadian identity that corresponds to the abolishment of the appeal to the Privy Council in 1949. This also corresponded to the post-war growth of government programs and authorities. Snell and Vaughn note that the Supreme Court could no longer rely on the Privy Council for instructions, and instead were dependent on their own intellectual skill. The period still reflected judicial conservatism. In Reference re Validity of the Wartime Leasehold Regulations (1950), Chief Justice Rinfret refused to allow counsel to refer to an article in the Canadian Bar Review because it was not an "authority." At the time, scholarly works were treated as authorities only after the author's death, on the theory that a living author could still change their mind. (Note: Reference re Wartime Leasehold Regulations, 1950 CanLII 27, [1950] SCR 124 (1 March 1950), Supreme Court (Canada)) George V.V. Nicholls, editor of the Canadian Bar Review, criticized this position as insufficiently forward-looking in light of the Court's new role as the nations final court of appeal.

The Court responded to rising public awareness of civil liberties. The British North America Act did not include any reference to civil liberties, requiring the Court to step away from judicial conservatism. These decisions were not always unanimous or cohesive, such as Saumur v Quebec (1953) where a 5–4 majority struck down a municipal by-law prohibiting the distribution of literature to the public, despite each member of the majority writing their own decision. In R v Boucher (1950), the Court narrowed the definition of seditious libel by removing mere critical statements without any intention to incite violence against the government. Both Boucher and Saumur were cases arising from Quebec where the Duplessis government restricted the rights of Jehovah's Witness. In both cases, the Court's Quebec justices dissented.

Chief Justice Rinfret continued to follow Justice Mignault's philosophy of sensitivity and defending Quebec's civil law. He was also known to show his impatience in Court. Justice Rand, was known for his intellect and frequent use of questions, including responding to counsel with the word "why", which he was described as using like a machine gun. Justice Taschereau was noted for his insistence on precision from counsel. Justice Kerwin was noted as a kindly and able jurist. Justice Kellock, was known as industrious, and for tenacity with which he held a viewpoint once arrived at. Justice Locke, was described as "rugged" and listened impassively to submissions by counsel. Justice Cartwright was known as a staunch defender of the rights of the criminal accused, and was described as being inflexibly determined to protect them. Justice Fauteux in contrast was known as a staunch defender of public order.

== Appraisal ==
The growing role of the Supreme Court in protecting civil liberties was generally applauded by contemporary commentators, although there was significant scrutiny of the quality of the reasons in these cases. In criminal law, the Court was criticized due to the disagreements between Justices Cartwright and Fauteux, and was described by Snell and Vaughan as being "hopelessly locked in a battle between antithetical positions" of the two justices. In Canadian Wheat Board v Manitoba Pool Elevators (1950), the Supreme Court showed a lack of awareness of social conditions and was described by contemporary legal scholar John Willis as out of touch with the realities of modern government. This lack of social awareness was criticized by future Supreme Court Justice Bora Laskin in his 1951 article in the Canadian Bar Review which articulated a vision for a new age where the Court was an element of Canadian self-government.

== See also ==
- Supreme Court of Canada cases
