= List of justices of the Supreme Court of Canada by seat =

The Supreme Court of Canada is the highest court of Canada. It was established by the Parliament of Canada through the Supreme and Exchequer Court Act of 1875, as authorized by Section 101 of the Constitution Act, 1867. Since 1949, the Court has been the final court of appeal in the Canadian justice system. (Previously, it had functioned as an intermediate appellate court subject to appeal to the Judicial Committee of the Privy Council in the United Kingdom.) Parliament initially fixed the size of the Court at six justices: the chief justice of Canada and five puisne justices; and, until 1887, the justices also sat individually as judges of the Exchequer Court. A sixth puisne justice was added in 1927, bringing the Court to a total of seven justices. Two additional puisne seats were created in 1949, bringing the Court to a total of nine justices, which is its current complement.

The following tables trace the succession of justices of the Supreme Court of Canada by seat. Justices are appointed by the governor general on the advice of the prime minister. When a chief justice leaves office, the vacancy is traditionally filled by elevating an incumbent puisne justice to the position, which requires a separate appointment process. There are no formal numbers or names for the individual puisne justice seats, which are listed in this article simply by number and the name of the first puisne justice to occupy it, as well as by the year in which each was established by Parliament. The numbering of puisne justice seats established simultaneously, 1–5 and 6–7, reflects the order of precedence of the inaugural justices to occupy those seats.

The start date listed for each justice is the day the justice took the judicial oath of office, and the end date is the date of the justice's death, resignation, retirement, or appointment as chief justice. The names of incumbents are in bold.

== Original seats ==
Chief Justice The Chief's seat
Established in 1875
William Buell Richards (1815–1889)	September 30, 1875 (Note: Appointed directly as chief justice.) – January 10, 1879
William Johnstone Ritchie (1813–1892)	January 11, 1879 – September 25, 1892
Samuel Henry Strong (1825–1909)	December 13, 1892 – November 17, 1902
Henri-Elzéar Taschereau (1836–1911)	November 21, 1902 – May 1, 1906
Charles Fitzpatrick (1853–1942)	June 4, 1906 – October 20, 1918
Louis Henry Davies (1845–1924)	October 23, 1918 – May 1, 1924
Francis Alexander Anglin (1865–1933)	September 16, 1924 – February 27, 1933
Lyman Duff (1865–1955)	March 17, 1933 – January 6, 1944
Thibaudeau Rinfret (1879–1962)	January 8, 1944 – June 21, 1954
Patrick Kerwin (1889–1963)	July 1, 1954 – February 2, 1963
Robert Taschereau (1896–1970)	April 22, 1963 – August 31, 1967
John Robert Cartwright (1895–1979)	September 1, 1967 – March 22, 1970
Joseph Honoré Gérald Fauteux (1900–1980)	March 23, 1970 – December 22, 1973
Bora Laskin (1912–1984)	December 27, 1973 – March 26, 1984
Brian Dickson (1916–1998)	April 18, 1984 – June 29, 1990
Antonio Lamer (1933–2007)	July 1, 1990 – January 6, 2000
Beverley McLachlin (born 1943)	January 7, 2000 – December 14, 2017
**Richard Wagner** (born 1957)	December 18, 2017 – present

Puisne Justice 1 The Ritchie seat
Established in 1875
William Johnstone Ritchie (1813–1892)	September 30, 1875 – January 11, 1879 (Note: Appointed chief justice)
John Wellington Gwynne (1814–1902)	January 14, 1879 – January 7, 1902
David Mills (1831–1903)	February 8, 1902 – May 8, 1903
Wallace Nesbitt (1858–1930)	May 16, 1903 – October 3, 1905
James Maclennan (1833–1915)	October 5, 1905 – February 12, 1909
Francis Alexander Anglin (1865–1933)	February 23, 1909 – September 16, 1924
Edmund Leslie Newcombe (1859–1931)	September 16, 1924 – December 9, 1931
Oswald Smith Crocket (1868–1945)	September 21, 1932 – April 12, 1943
Ivan Rand (1884–1969)	April 22, 1943 – April 26, 1959
Roland Ritchie (1910–1988)	May 5, 1959 – October 30, 1984
Gérard La Forest (born 1926)	January 16, 1985 – September 30, 1997
Michel Bastarache (born 1947)	September 30, 1997 – June 30, 2008
Thomas Cromwell (born 1952)	December 22, 2008 – August 31, 2016
**Malcolm Rowe** (born 1953)	October 28, 2016 – present

Puisne Justice 2 The Strong seat
Established in 1875
Samuel Henry Strong (1825–1909)	September 30, 1875 – December 13, 1892
Robert Sedgewick (1848–1906)	February 18, 1893 – August 4, 1906
Lyman Duff (1865–1955)	September 27, 1906 – March 17, 1933
Frank Joseph Hughes (1883–1967)	March 17, 1933 – February 12, 1935
Patrick Kerwin (1889–1963)	July 20, 1935 – July 1, 1954
Douglas Charles Abbott (1899–1987)	July 1, 1954 – December 22, 1973
Louis-Philippe de Grandpré (1917–2008)	January 1, 1974 – September 30, 1977
Yves Pratte (1925–1988)	October 1, 1977 – June 29, 1979
Julien Chouinard (1929–1987)	September 24, 1979 – February 6, 1987
Claire L'Heureux-Dubé (born 1927)	April 15, 1987 – June 30, 2002
Marie Deschamps (born 1952)	August 7, 2002 – August 6, 2012
Richard Wagner (born 1957)	October 5, 2012 – December 18, 2017
Sheilah Martin (born 1956)	December 18, 2017 – May 30, 2026
**Glenn D. Joyal**	June 30, 2026 – present

Puisne Justice 3 The Taschereau seat
Established in 1875
Jean-Thomas Taschereau (1814–1893)	September 30, 1875 – October 6, 1878
Sir Henri-Elzéar Taschereau (1836–1911)	October 7, 1878 – November 21, 1902
John Douglas Armour (1830–1903)	November 21, 1902 – July 11, 1903
Albert Clements Killam (1849–1908)	August 8, 1903 – February 5, 1905
John Idington (1840–1928)	February 10, 1905 – March 30, 1927
John Henderson Lamont (1865–1936)	April 2, 1927 – March 10, 1936
Albert Blellock Hudson (1875–1947)	March 24, 1936 – January 6, 1947
Charles Holland Locke (1887–1980)	June 3, 1947 – September 15, 1962
Emmett Matthew Hall (1898–1995)	November 23, 1962 – February 28, 1973
Brian Dickson (1916–1998)	March 26, 1973 – April 18, 1984
Gerald Le Dain (1924–2007)	May 29, 1984 – November 29, 1988
Peter Cory (1925-2020)	February 1, 1989 – May 31, 1999
Louise Arbour (Note: Justices Iacobucci and Arbour retired on the same day, June 30, 2004. Their successors, Justices Abella and Charron were appointed on the same day, August 30, 2004. Since Justice Iacobucci was senior to Justice Arbour in the order precedence, and Justice Abella was senior to Justice Charron, for the purposes of this table Justice Abella is deemed to have succeeded Justice Iacobucci, and Justice Charron to have succeeded Justice Arbour.) (born 1947)	September 15, 1999 – June 30, 2004
Louise Charron (Note: Justices Binnie and Charron both retired in 2011. Their successors, Justices Moldaver and Karakatsanis, were both appointed on the same day, October 21, 2011. Since Justice Binnie was senior to Justice Charron in the order precedence, and as Justice Moldaver is likewise senior to Justice Karakatsanis, for the purposes of this table Justice Moldaver is deemed to have succeeded Justice Binnie, and Justice Karakatstanis to have succeeded Justice Charron.) (born 1951)	August 30, 2004 – August 29, 2011
**Andromache Karakatsanis** (born 1955)	October 21, 2011 – present

Puisne Justice 4 The Fournier seat
Established in 1875
Télesphore Fournier (1823–1896)	September 30, 1875 – September 11, 1895
Désiré Girouard (1836–1911)	September 28, 1895 – March 22, 1911
Louis-Philippe Brodeur (1862–1924)	August 11, 1911 – October 9, 1923
Arthur Cyrille Albert Malouin (1857–1936)	January 30, 1924 – September 30, 1924
Thibaudeau Rinfret (1879–1962)	October 1, 1924 – January 8, 1944
Roy Lindsay Kellock (1893–1975)	October 3, 1944 – January 14, 1958
Wilfred Judson (1902–1980)	February 5, 1958 – July 19, 1977
Willard Estey (1919–2002)	September 29, 1977 – April 21, 1988
John Sopinka (1933–1997)	May 24, 1988 – November 24, 1997
Ian Binnie (born 1939)	January 8, 1998 – October 20, 2011
Michael Moldaver (born 1947)	October 21, 2011 – August 31, 2022
**Michelle O'Bonsawin** (born 1973/74)	September 1, 2022 – present

Puisne Justice 5 The Henry seat
Established in 1875
William Alexander Henry (1816–1888)	September 30, 1875 – May 3, 1888
Christopher Salmon Patterson (1823–1893)	October 27, 1888 – July 24, 1893
George Edwin King (1839–1901)	September 21, 1893 – May 8, 1901
Louis Henry Davies (1845–1924)	September 25, 1901 – October 23, 1918
Pierre-Basile Mignault (1854–1945)	October 25, 1918 – September 29, 1929
Lawrence Arthur Dumoulin Cannon (1877–1939)	January 14, 1930 – December 25, 1939
Robert Taschereau (1896–1970)	February 9, 1940 – April 22, 1963
Wishart Flett Spence (1904–1998)	May 30, 1963 – December 28, 1978
William McIntyre (1918–2009)	January 1, 1979 – February 14, 1989
Beverley McLachlin (born 1943)	March 30, 1989 – January 7, 2000
Louis LeBel (1939-2023)	January 7, 2000 – November 29, 2014
**Suzanne Côté** (born 1958)	December 1, 2014 – present

== Additional seats ==
Puisne Justice 6 The Smith seat
Established in 1927
Robert Smith (1858–1942)	May 18, 1927 – December 6, 1933
Henry Hague Davis (1885–1944)	January 31, 1935 – June 30, 1944
James Wilfred Estey (1889–1956)	October 6, 1944 – January 22, 1956
Henry Grattan Nolan (1893–1957)	March 1, 1956 – July 8, 1957
Ronald Martland (1909–1997)	January 15, 1958 – February 9, 1982
Bertha Wilson (1923–2007)	March 4, 1982 – January 3, 1991
Frank Iacobucci (born 1937)	January 7, 1991 – June 30, 2004
Rosalie Abella (born 1946)	August 30, 2004 – June 30, 2021
**Mahmud Jamal** (born 1967)	July 1, 2021 – present

Puisne Justice 7 The Cartwright seat
Established in 1949
John Robert Cartwright (1895–1979)	December 22, 1949 – September 1, 1967
Louis-Philippe Pigeon (1905–1986)	September 21, 1967 – February 7, 1980
Antonio Lamer (1933–2007)	March 28, 1980 – July 1, 1990
William Stevenson (1934–2021)	September 17, 1990 – June 4, 1992
John C. Major (born 1931)	November 13, 1992 – December 24, 2005
Marshall Rothstein (born 1940)	March 1, 2006 – August 30, 2015
Russell Brown (born 1965)	August 31, 2015 – June 12, 2023
**Mary Moreau** (born 1957)	November 6, 2023 – present

Puisne Justice 8 The Fauteux seat
Established 1949
Joseph Honoré Gérald Fauteux (1900–1980)	December 22, 1949 – March 23, 1970
Bora Laskin (1912–1984)	March 19, 1970 – December 27, 1973
Jean Beetz (1927–1991)	January 1, 1974 – November 9, 1988
Charles Gonthier (1928–2009)	February 1, 1989 – July 31, 2003
Morris Fish (born 1938)	August 5, 2003 – August 30, 2013
Clément Gascon (born 1960)	June 9, 2014 – September 15, 2019
**Nicholas Kasirer** (born 1960)	September 16, 2019 – present

== Sources ==
- Dates of service from:
  "Current and Former Chief Justices". Ottawa, Ontario: Supreme Court of Canada.
  "Current and Former Judges". Ottawa, Ontario: Supreme Court of Canada.
