= Saumur v Quebec (City of) =

- Supreme Court of Canada

Hearing: December 9–12, 15-17, 1952 Judgment: October 6, 1953
- Full case name: Laurier Saumur v The City of Quebec
- Citations: [1953] 2 SCR 299; 1953 CanLII 3
- Ruling: Saumur appeal allowed

Court membership
- Chief Justice: Thibaudeau Rinfret; Puisne Justices: Patrick Kerwin, Robert Taschereau, Ivan Rand, Roy Kellock, James Wilfred Estey, Charles Holland Locke, John Robert Cartwright, Gerald Fauteux

Reasons given
- Majority: Kerwin J.
- Concurrence: Rand J.
- Concurrence: Kellock J.
- Concurrence: Estey J.
- Concurrence: Locke J.
- Dissent: Rinfret C.J., joined by Taschereau J.
- Dissent: Cartwright J., joined by Fauteux J.

Saumur v Quebec (City of) [1953] 2 SCR 299 is a famous constitutional decision of the Supreme Court of Canada which struck down a municipal by-law prohibiting the distribution of literature to the public.

Laurier Saumur (6 Feb. 1921–22 Mar. 2007) was born and raised Catholic, but grew disillusioned as a youth and studied the teachings of the Jehovah's Witnesses. He was baptized as a Witness in 1944 and soon began to work as a door-to-door missionary for the Witnesses, first in Montreal and then in Quebec City. At the time, police harassment of Witnesses was widespread in Quebec, and Mr. Saumur had been arrested 103 times for distribution of Witness literature when he decided to challenge the legal basis for the arrests.

A group of Jehovah's Witnesses, along with Saumur, challenged a Quebec City municipal by-law that prohibited the distribution of literature in the street without the proper authorization of the city's Chief of Police on the basis that it was outside of the municipality's jurisdiction and that it had the effect of religious and political censorship. The case reached the Supreme Court in 1953.

In a 5 to 4 decision, the Court held that the subject matter of the law was in relation to "speech" or "religion" which were both in the exclusive legislative jurisdiction of the federal government. The majority noted that the law had the effect that the chief of police would act in the role of a censor, deciding whether certain literature was objectionable. The result, they observed, would be that unpopular groups such as the Jehovah's Witnesses would be censored.

The dissent focused on the purpose of the law, observing that it was intended to protect the public and keep the streets clean. They found no basis for Saumur's claim that it prevented the Jehovah's Witnesses from their religious practice.

This decision was subsequently used to dismiss more than 1000 cases against Witnesses in the Province of Quebec. It was one of a series of cases the Supreme Court dealt with concerning the rights of Jehovah's Witnesses under the Duplessis government of Quebec. Previous to this there was the case of R v Boucher [1951] S.C.R. 265 according to which mere criticism of the government does not constitute seditious libel. Subsequent to Saumur was the case of Roncarelli v Duplessis [1959] S.C.R. 121 which punished Duplessis for revoking a Jehovah's Witness liquor license.

== See also ==
- Lamb v Benoit
