= Frey v Fedoruk =

1950 Supreme Court of Canada case

- Supreme Court of Canada

Hearing: February 7, 1950 Judgment: April 25, 1950
- Full case name: Bernard Frey v. Stephen Fedoruk and Richard Percy Stone
- Citations: [1950] SCR 517, 1950 CanLII 1
- Prior history: Judgement for Fedoruk in the Court of Appeal for British Columbia

Holding
- Imprisonment in this case failed to be justified since peeping was not a recognized crime.

Court membership
- Chief Justice: Thibaudeau Rinfret; Puisne Justices: Patrick Kerwin, Robert Taschereau, Ivan Rand, Roy Kellock, James Wilfred Estey, Charles Holland Locke, John Robert Cartwright, Gerald Fauteux

Reasons given
- Majority: Cartwright J., joined by Rinfret C.J., Taschereau, Rand, Kellock, and Locke JJ.
- Concurrence: Kerwin J.

Frey v Fedoruk [1950] S.C.R. 517 is a decision by the Supreme Court of Canada on the definition of a breach of the peace and whether being a "peeping tom" is a crime. The Court found that actions do not necessarily breach the peace just because they cause violent reactions. Due to this finding, courts would have less say in determining what is criminal as a breach of the peace, and the Parliament of Canada would have more.

== Background ==
At the time, peeping was not specifically prohibited. Allegedly, the appellant Frey had left his truck to look into a window of a house at 11:15 P.M. A woman saw him looking in, and shouted, and her adult son took a butcher knife and went outside. He chased Frey, caught him, and called the police. The police, seeing footprints near the house, arrested Frey. Frey also alleged the police constable attacked him, although in court Frey mainly fought his arrest as false imprisonment.

The British Columbia Court of Appeal found the imprisonment was not false imprisonment, since Frey had, in the words of Justice O'Halloran, "disturbed their tranquillity and privacy in a manner that he would naturally expect to invite immediate violence against him." A breach of the peace was thus defined by this judge as being a reference to riots, or something that interferes with the peace of private persons; the latter was said to go "so deeply into the roots of the Common law."

== Decision ==
Justice John Robert Cartwright, for the majority of the Supreme Court, found that the burden of proof that the imprisonment was lawful rested on the woman's son Fedoruk and Constable Stone. Both Fedoruk and Stone had said the arrest was a response to an action, namely peeping, that could have led to a breach of the peace. Cartwright replied that while it is true that seeing a man peeping into one's home can be horrifying, that would not necessarily make a violent reaction a defence. Without evidence that the "peeping tom" is attacking, a violent response would simply be revenge. Cartwright also noted the peeping was "not otherwise criminal and not falling within any category of offences defined by the Criminal Law," and that recognizing it as criminal now could lead to many other legal actions, such as adultery or giving insults, being considered criminal. In general, this would make the law less clear. As Cartwright said, "I think that if any course of conduct is now to be declared criminal, which has not up to the present time been so regarded, such declaration should be made by Parliament and not by the Courts." Moreover, while a lexicon did define a breach of the peace as including actions that can cause others to violate the peace, Cartwright concluded that it would stretch the meaning of these words too broadly to cover actions that would probably result in violent revenge.

Cartwright also found Stone's arrest, done without an arrest warrant, could not be justified under the Criminal Code. The Criminal Code could not protect an officer's wrong opinion that something that is not an offence is an offence.

== Concurrence ==
Justice Patrick Kerwin wrote an opinion concurring with the dissent on the Court of Appeal. Kerwin defined a breach of the peace as violence or something that provokes commotion. However, something does not breach the peace simply because it is irritating.

== See also ==
- List of Supreme Court of Canada cases (Richards Court through Fauteux Court)
