= Reference Re Persons of Japanese Race =

Court case about deportation of Japanese-Canadians

- Court: Judicial Committee of the Privy Council
- Full case name: The Co-operative Committee on Japanese Canadians and another v The Attorney-General of Canada and another
- Decided: 2 December 1946
- Citations: [1946] UKPC 48, [1947] AC 87, 1946 CanLII 361

Case history
- Appealed from: Reference to the Validity of Orders in Council in relation to Persons of Japanese Race, 1946 CanLII 46, [1946] SCR 248 (20 February 1946), Supreme Court (Canada)

Reference Re Persons of Japanese Race is a famous decision of the Judicial Committee of the Privy Council, which upheld a Supreme Court of Canada ruling declaring a government order to deport Canadian citizens of Japanese descent to be valid.

== Background ==
In January 1942, paranoia among white Canadians on the west coast had reached its peak. On February 24, 1942, an order-in-council passed under the Defence of Canada Regulations made under the War Measures Act gave the federal government the power to intern all "persons of Japanese racial origin." Nearly 21,000 people of Japanese descent were placed in these camps.

In December 1945, the federal Cabinet issued three Orders in Council:

- #7355 provided for the deportation of:

- all Japanese nationals who were not Canadian nationals, who

- after the declaration of war with Japan had made a request for repatriation, or
- who were still detained under the Defence of Canada Regulations on 1 September 1945,

- naturalized British subjects of Japanese origin who requested such a move, and who had not revoked such a request in writing prior to 1 September 1945,
- natural born British subjects of Japanese origin who requested such a move (provided such request had not been revoked in writing prior to an order for deportation), plus
- wives and children of those involved.

- #7356 provided that naturalized British subjects who were so deported would lose that status.
- #7357 provided for inquiries to be held with respect to requests for repatriation.

After the war, these Orders in Council that authorized the deportation were challenged on the basis that the forced deportation of the Japanese was a crime against humanity and that a citizen could not be deported from their own country. The federal Cabinet posed the following reference question to the Supreme Court of Canada:

Are the Orders in Council dated the 15th day of December, 1945, being P.C. 7355, 7356 and 7357, ultra vires of the Governor in Council either in whole or in part and, if so, in what particular or particulars and to what extent?

The matter was heard by the Supreme Court in the first case heard in the newly constructed building housing the Court.

== At the Supreme Court ==
The SCC rendered a mixed ruling:

- the Court was unanimous as to the validity of deportations of Japanese nationals and naturalized British subjects
- In a 5-2 decision, the Court held that the validity of deportations was valid with respect to natural born British subjects
- In a 4-3 decision, they ruled that the provision relating to the deportation of wives and children was ultra vires, with Rand J, for the majority, specifying that deportation in relation to wives and children who did not fall within the classes of Japanese nationals and naturalized British subjects under the order was ultra vires
- In a 5-2 decision, the other two Orders in Council were declared intra vires

Three justices (Rand, Kellock and Estey JJ) stated that the Orders in Council continued to have effect after the War Measures Act ceased to be in force on 1 January 1946, by virtue of the National Emergency Transitional Powers Act, 1946.

=== Reasons given for the ruling ===
- valid
- invalid
- valid in part

Analysis of ruling
| Order in Council | | Rinfret CJ | Kerwin J | Taschereau J | Hudson J | Estey J | Kellock J | Rand J |
|---|---|---|---|---|---|---|---|---|
| O.C. 7355 | as to Japanese nationals who are not Canadian nationals | | | | | | | |
| O.C. 7355 | as to naturalized British subjects of Japanese origin | | | | | | | |
| O.C. 7355 | as to natural born British subjects of Japanese origin | | | | | | ultra vires insofar as it prevents such persons from withdrawing consent at any time and in any manner. | |
| O.C. 7355 | as to wives and children of the above | | | | | | | ultra vires in relation to those who do not come within the first two classes |
| O.C. 7356 | as to naturalized British subjects losing their status after deportation | | | | | | intra vires insofar as it takes away incidental rights and privileges of persons of the Japanese race as Canadian nationals, but ultra vires to the extent that it provides for loss of the status of a British subject by naturalization. | |
| O.C. 7357 | as to inquiries to be held with respect to requests for repatriation | | | | | | not ultra vires, subject to the observance of the requirements of the British Nationality and Status of Aliens Act, 1914 as to grounds for the revocation of naturalization. | intra vires save insofar as it may purport to authorize a departure from the provisions of the Naturalization Act. |

Rinfret CJ and Kerwin and Taschereau JJ, being the only three justices to uphold the validity of all three Orders in Council in their entirety, held that they were lawful because such orders arising from the War Measures Act are legislative in nature — equivalent to an Act of Parliament — in line with previous jurisprudence.

== At the Privy Council ==
The case was appealed to the Judicial Committee of the Privy Council, which declared that all three Orders in Council were intra vires, for the reasons given at the SCC by Rinfret CJ and Kerwin and Taschereau JJ.

The decision was delivered by Lord Wright, with a panel composed of Viscount Simon, Lord Porter, Lord Uthwatt, and Sir Lyman Poore Duff. Duff, the former Chief Justice of Canada had retired two years before the Supreme Court had heard the appeal.

== Aftermath ==
In 1946, 3,965 people were repatriated to Japan.

In 1947, due to various protests among politicians and academics, the federal cabinet revoked the legislation to repatriate the remaining Japanese Canadians to Japan. It was only in April 1949 that all restrictions were lifted from Japanese Canadians. However, former Canadian citizens of Japanese ancestry now living in Japan were denied passports.

The Canadian government also launched a Royal Commission (led by Justice Henry Bird) in 1947 to examine the issue of compensation for confiscated property. By 1950, the Bird Commission awarded $1.3 million in claims to 1,434 Japanese Canadians; however, it accepted only claims based on loss of property, refusing to compensate for wrongdoing in terms of civil rights, damages due to loss of earnings, disruption of education or other issues.

On September 22, 1988, Prime Minister Brian Mulroney gave a formal apology and the Canadian government announced a compensation package, one month after President Ronald Reagan made similar gestures in the United States. The package for interned Japanese Canadians included $21,000 to each surviving internee, and the reinstatement of Canadian citizenship to those who were deported to Japan. The agreement also awarded $12 million to the NAJC to promote human rights and support the community, and $24 million for the establishment of the Canadian Race Relations Foundation to push for the elimination of racism. Nothing was given for those that had been interned and died before compensation was given out.

== See also ==
- List of Supreme Court of Canada cases (Richards Court through Fauteux Court)
- Korematsu v. United States 32 U.S. 214 (1944) - similar US case
