= R v Boucher =

Freedom of expression case of the Supreme Court of Canada

Boucher v The King
- Supreme Court of Canada

Hearing: Judgment: December 18, 1950
- Full case name: Aime Boucher v. His Majesty the King
- Citations: [1951] SCR 265; 1950 CanLII 2
- Prior history: Judgment for the Crown in the Quebec Court of King's Bench, Appeal Side.
- Ruling: Appeal allowed.

Holding
- The criminal offence of seditious libel requires language that is calculated to promote public disorder or physical force or violence.

Court membership
- Chief Justice: Thibaudeau Rinfret; Puisne Justices: Patrick Kerwin, Robert Taschereau, Ivan Rand, Roy Kellock, James Wilfred Estey, Charles Holland Locke, John Robert Cartwright, Gerald Fauteux

Reasons given
- Majority: Kerwin J.
- Concurrence: Rand J.
- Concurrence: Kellock J.
- Concurrence: Estey J.
- Concurrence: Locke J.
- Dissent: Rinfret C.J.
- Dissent: Taschereau J.
- Dissent: Cartwright J., joined by Fauteux J.

R v Boucher is a Supreme Court of Canada decision. In the case, the Court overturned a conviction for seditious libel, on the grounds that criticizing the government was a valid form of protest.

== Background ==
Aimé Boucher was a farmer in Beauce, Quebec, and a practising Jehovah's Witness. In 1946, he was arrested while distributing pamphlets entitled "Québec's Burning Hate for God and Christ and Freedom Is the Shame of all Canada." The pamphlets criticized the Québec government’s suppression of the Witnesses and the courts for doing nothing to prevent it. Boucher was charged for seditious libel — for endeavouring to promote public disorder — under section 133(2) of the Criminal Code. At trial, the jury found Boucher guilty, which was upheld on appeal. (Note: Boucher v The King, 1950 CanLII 2, [1951] SCR 265, Supreme Court (Canada))

== Opinion of the Court ==
The conviction was affirmed by a majority in the Court of King's Bench (Appeal Side). An appeal to this Court was allowed on grounds of misdirection and improper rejection of evidence. On the first hearing of this appeal, heard by a Court of five judges, the majority ordered a new trial. (Note: Boucher v The King, 1949 CanLII 334, [1950] 1 DLR 657, Supreme Court (Canada))

Application was then made, and granted, to have the appeal reargued before a full Court of nine judges. On the re-argument, it was conceded on behalf of the Crown that the conviction should be quashed due to errors in the trial judge's charge, and the only question which remained was as to whether there was evidence upon which a properly instructed jury could find the appellant guilty of publishing a seditious libel by reason of the publication of the pamphlet here in question.

In a 5 to 4 decision, the Supreme Court held that the mere publishing of critical statements, without any intention to incite violence against the government, could not be seditious libel.

== See also ==
- Lamb v Benoit
