= Lamb v Benoit =

1959 Supreme Court of Canada case

Lamb v Benoit, [1959] SCR 321 was a legal case that was heard by the Supreme Court of Canada. Louise Lamb, a Jehovah's Witness, was arrested for distributing religious pamphlets in Verdun, Quebec, in 1946, along with three other members of the religion.

== Background ==
Non-Catholic religious minorities were persecuted after World War II, particularly during the Duplessis era. Jehovah's Witnesses were considered to be a "seditious" and "subversive" religion. Through the Padlock Act and other legal measures, the activities of Jehovah's Witnesses were legally restricted. In 1947, Jehovah's Witnesses launched a preaching campaign condemning these restrictions and advocating the rights of religious minorities. The Legislative Assembly of Quebec responded to this campaign with increasing severity through the control of "subversive" materials. Individual municipalities also passed legislature restricting religious activities. Rabbi Solomon Frank, a founding member of the Canadian Jewish Congress (CJC), advocated for the religious freedom of Jehovah's Witnesses, criticizing Quebec's government of being "anti-democratic."

In 1953, the case of Saumur v Quebec (City of) (1953) 25 CR 299 (in which a Jehovah's Witness challenged a Quebec City bylaw prohibiting public distribution of literature without a permit) left the question of religious freedom undecided as: "both Parliament and the provinces could validly limit freedom of worship providing they did so in the course of legislating on some other subject which lay within their respective powers." This decision was part of a series of cases the Supreme Court dealt with concerning the rights of Jehovah's Witnesses under the Duplessis government of Quebec. Previous to this there was the case of R. v. Boucher [1951] S.C.R. 265 that upheld the right to distribute pamphlets.

Subsequent to Saumur was the case of Roncarelli v Duplessis [1959] S.C.R. 121. The court held that in 1946 Maurice Duplessis, both Premier and Attorney General of Quebec, had overstepped his authority by ordering the manager of the Liquor Commission to revoke the liquor licence of Frank Roncarelli, a Montreal restaurant owner and Jehovah's Witness who was an outspoken critic of the Roman Catholic Church in Quebec. Roncarelli provided bail for Jehovah's Witnesses arrested for distributing pamphlets attacking the Roman Catholic Church. The Supreme Court found Duplessis personally liable for $33,123.56 in damages plus Roncarelli's court costs.

== Case ==
Lamb was accused by the plaintiff of distributing copies of Quebec's Burning Hate, but the Supreme Court found no evidence of that specific pamphlet being distributed. Lamb was detained for a weekend without access to legal counsel. Local authorities offered to release Lamb if she would not hold them responsible for her detention, but she refused. She was then charged with conspiracy to publish sedition, but this was dismissed by a trial judge and that decision was upheld when appealed. Justice Abbott, a common law justice, concluded that the police officers had violated a Quebec statute through not acting in good faith. She was awarded $2,500 in damages. This was cited by Kent Roach, writing for the University of Toronto Law Journal, as an example that "courts were more generous in accessing damages than they are today under the Charter".

== See also ==
- Canadian Bill of Rights – federal statute enacted in 1960
- Canadian Charter of Rights and Freedoms – part of the Canadian Constitution
- Freedom of expression in Canada
- Supreme Court cases involving Jehovah's Witnesses by country
