= Frank Joseph Hughes =

Canadian Supreme Court judge (1883–1967)

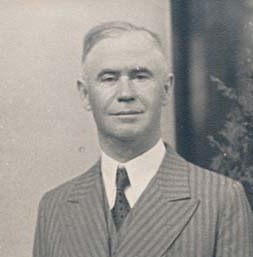

Puisne Justice of the Supreme Court of Canada
- In office March 17, 1933 – February 12, 1935
- Nominated by: Richard Bedford Bennett
- Preceded by: Lyman Duff
- Succeeded by: Patrick Kerwin

Personal details
- Born: November 26, 1883 Peel County, Ontario
- Died: April 14, 1967 (aged 83)
- Education: Queen's University and Osgoode Hall Law School
- Occupation: Lawyer, jurist

Frank Joseph Hughes (November 26, 1883 – April 14, 1967) was a Canadian lawyer and puisne judge of the Supreme Court of Canada.

== Biography ==
Born in Peel County, Ontario, the son of James Hughes and Winnifred Mullarkey, he received a Bachelor of Arts degree from Queen's University in 1907 and studied at Osgoode Hall Law School. In 1911, he was called to the Bar of Ontario. He established a law practice in Toronto specializing in insurance defence, as well as a period as assistant Crown attorney.

On March 17, 1933, Prime Minister R.B. Bennett appointed Hughes to the Supreme Court at the age of 49, filling the vacancy created by the resignation of Chief Justice Francis Alexander Anglin. While Snell and Vaughan note that Hughes was a good and capable appointment due to his vast experience running appeals, despite not serving on the bench before his appointment. Hughes struggled with the appointment due to a heart attack in 1933 and the effect of the move to Ottawa on himself and his family. A little over a year after his appointment in August 1934, Hughes tendered his resignation with effect after the fall sittings of the Court. His resignation became official on February 12, 1935.

After his resignation from the bench, Hughes returned to legal practice. He died in Toronto in 1967, aged 83.

A Roman Catholic, Hughes was a Knight of Columbus.
