= Voyeurism =

Sexual interest in or practice of spying on people engaged in intimate behaviors

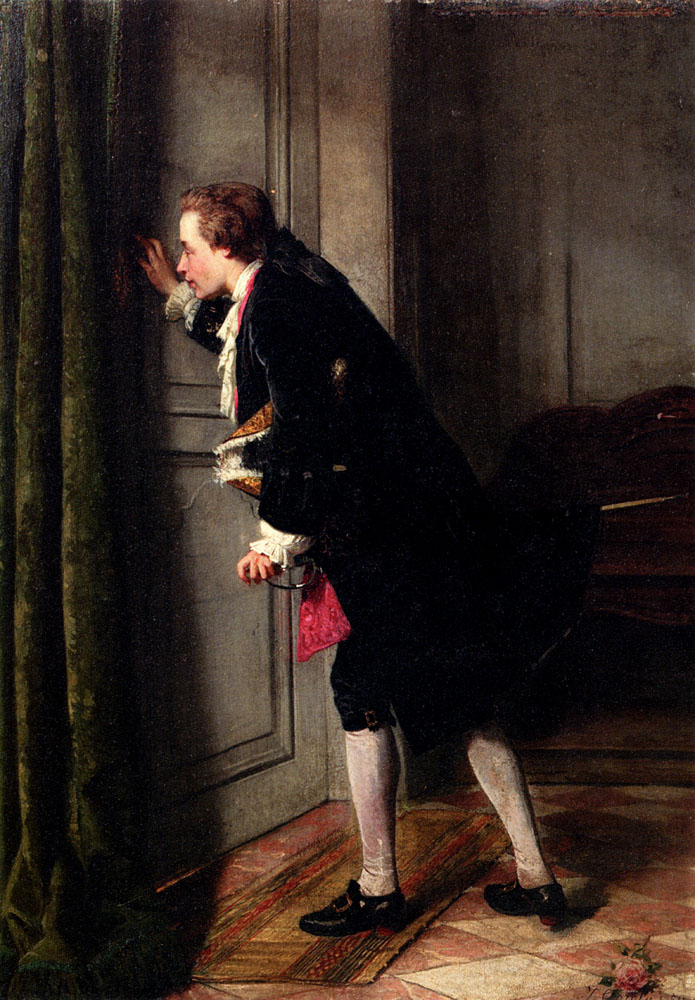
- Peeping Tom by Jean Carolus
- Specialty: Psychiatry

Voyeurism is the habit of clandestinely watching other people engaged in intimate behaviors, such as undressing, sexual activity, or other actions of a private nature, commonly for sexual stimulation. It may be a form of paraphilia.

The term comes from the French voyeur, which means 'watcher', derived from the verb voir 'to see'. A male voyeur is commonly labelled as "Peeping Tom" or a "Jags", a term which originates from the Lady Godiva legend.

The American Psychiatric Association has classified certain voyeuristic fantasies, urges and behaviour patterns as a paraphilia in the Diagnostic and Statistical Manual (DSM-IV) if the person has acted on these urges, or the sexual urges or fantasies cause marked distress or interpersonal difficulty. It is described as a disorder of sexual preference in the ICD-10. The DSM-IV defines voyeurism as the act of observing "individuals, usually strangers, engaging in sexual activity, exhibitionism, or disrobing". The diagnosis as a disorder would not be given to people who experience typical sexual arousal or amusement, simply by inadvertently seeing nudity or sexual activity.

In a number of legislations voyeurism is criminalized in cases when it is non-consensual or violates the expectation of privacy.

== Historical perspectives ==
There is relatively little academic research regarding voyeurism. When a review was published in 1976 there were only 15 available resources. Voyeurs were well-paying hole-lookers in especially Parisian brothels, a commercial innovation described as far back as 1857 but not gaining much notoriety until the 1880s, and not attracting formal medical-forensic recognition until the early 1890s. Society has accepted the use of the term voyeur as a description of anyone who views the intimate lives of others, even outside of a sexual context. This term is specifically used regarding reality television and other media which allow people to view the personal lives of others. This is a reversal from the historical perspective, moving from a term which describes a specific population in detail, to one which describes the general population vaguely.

One of the few historical theories on the causes of voyeurism comes from psychoanalytic theory. Psychoanalytic theory proposes that voyeurism results from a failure to accept castration anxiety and as a result of failure to identify with the father.

== Prevalence ==
Voyeurism has high prevalence rates in most studied populations. Voyeurism was once believed to only be present in a small portion of the population. This perception changed when Alfred Kinsey discovered that 30% of men prefer coitus with the lights on. This behaviour is not considered voyeurism by modern diagnostic standards, and much of Kinsey's methodology has come under criticism in later years and his research is now recognized as not representative of the general population, but there was little differentiation between normal and pathological behavior during Kinsey's era. Subsequent research showed that 65% of men had engaged in peeping, which suggests that this behavior is widely spread throughout the population. Congruent with this, research found voyeurism of some type to be the most common sexual law-breaking behavior in both clinical and general populations. An earlier study, based on 60 college men from a rural area, indicates that 54% had voyeuristic fantasies, and that 42% had tried voyeurism, concluding that young men are more easily aroused by the idea.

In a national study of Sweden it was found that 7.7% of the population (16% of men and 4% of women) had engaged in voyeurism at some point. It is also believed that voyeurism occurs up to 150 times more frequently than police reports indicate. This same study also indicates that there are high levels of co-occurrence between voyeurism and exhibitionism, finding that 63% of voyeurs also report exhibitionist behavior.

== Characteristics ==
People engage in voyeuristic behaviours for diverse reasons, but statistics can indicate which groups are likelier to engage in the act.

Early research indicated that voyeurs were more mentally healthy than other groups with paraphilias. Compared to the other groups studied, it was found that voyeurs were unlikely to be alcoholics or drug users. More recent research shows that, compared to the general population, voyeurs were moderately more likely to have psychological problems, use alcohol and drugs, and have higher sexual interest generally. This study also shows that voyeurs have a greater number of sexual partners per year, and are more likely to have had a same-sex partner than most of the populations. Both older and newer research found that voyeurs typically have a later age of first sexual intercourse. However, other research found no difference in sexual history between voyeurs and non-voyeurs. Voyeurs who are not also exhibitionists tend to be from a higher socioeconomic status than those who do show exhibitionist behaviour.

=== Gender differences ===
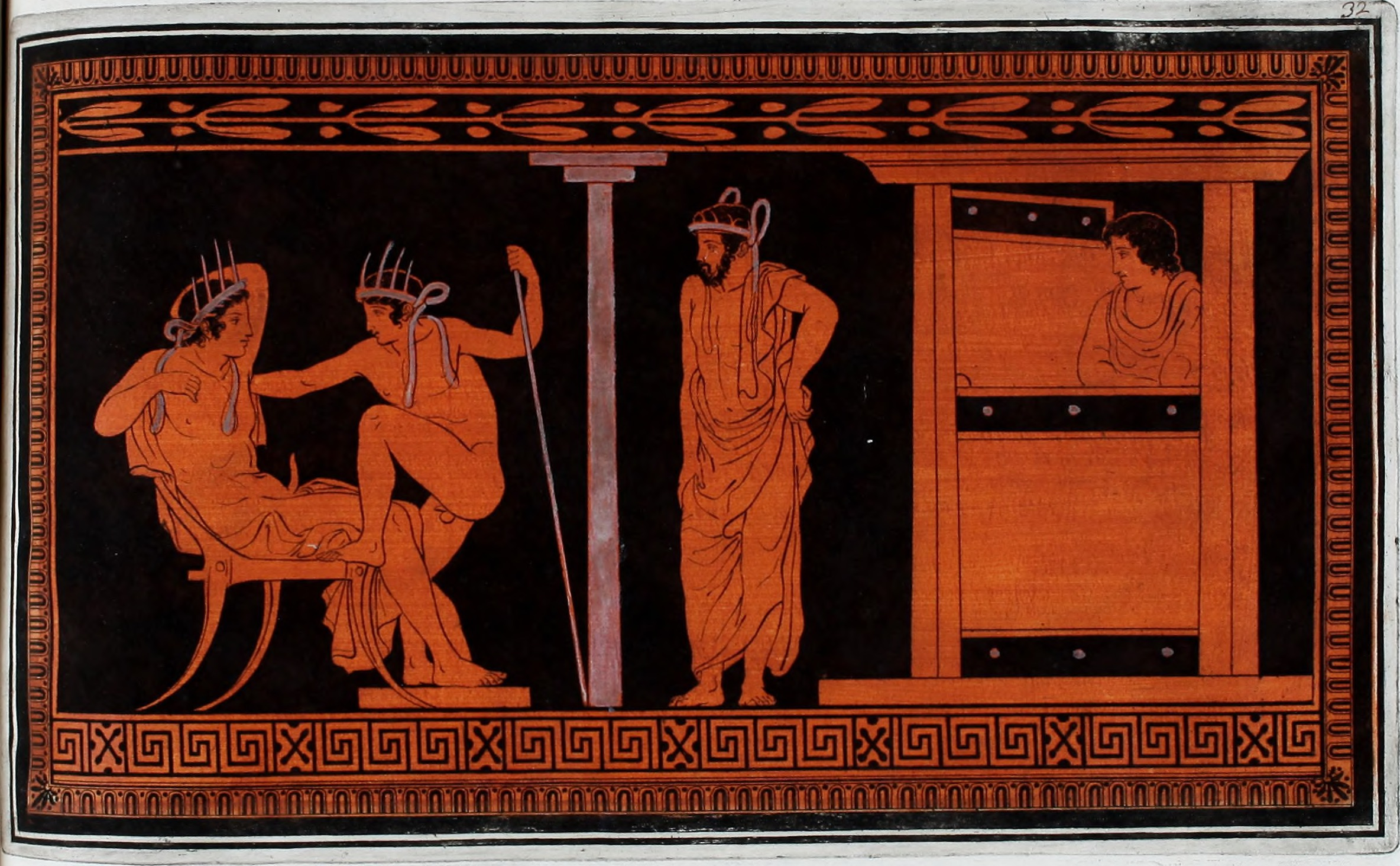
Sex between male youths spied on by man and woman. The Dinos Painter, fifth century BCE.

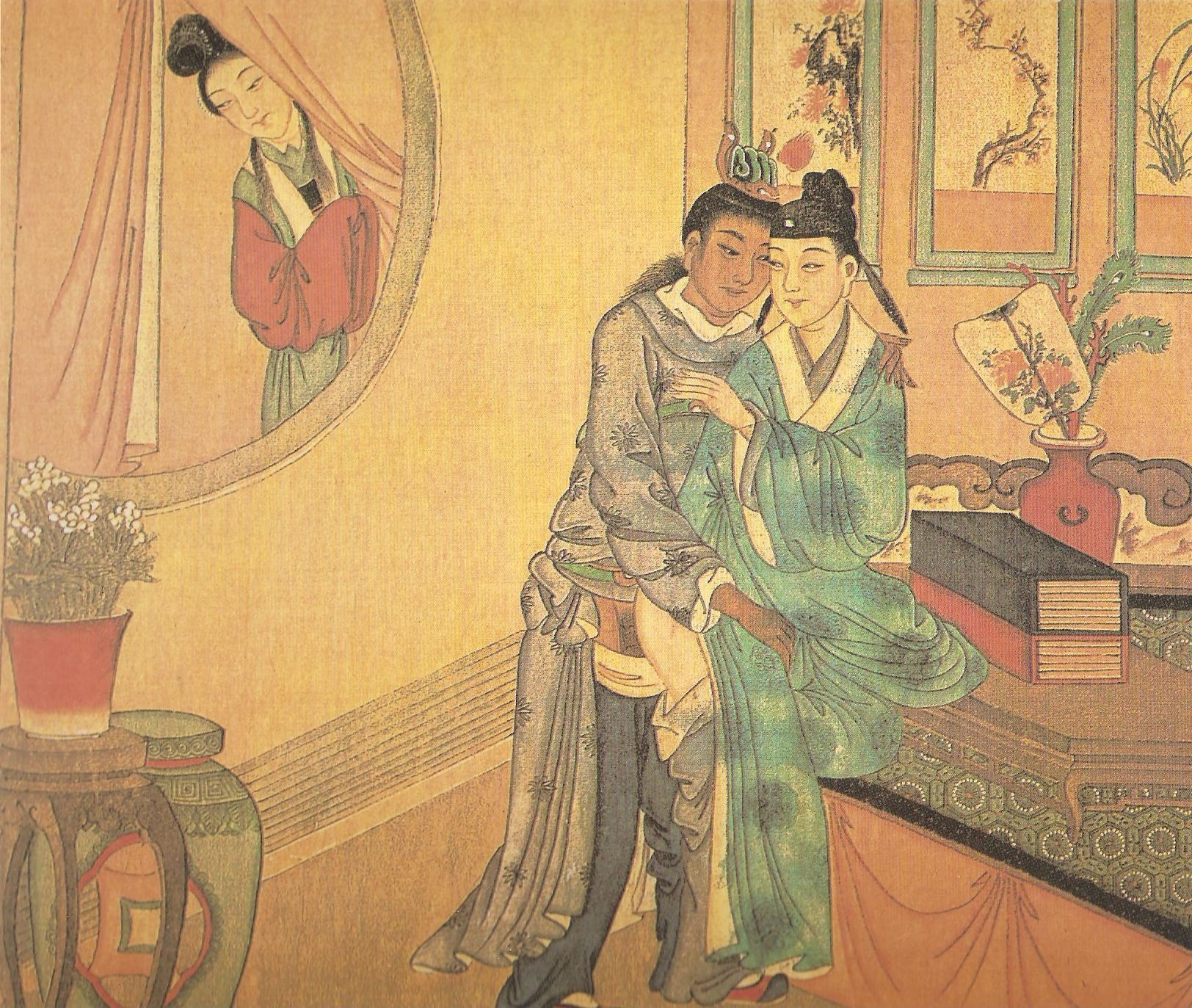
Woman spies on male couple, 18th-century, Qing Dynasty.

Research shows that, like almost all paraphilias, voyeurism is more common in men than in women. However, research has found that men and women both report roughly the same likelihood that they would hypothetically engage in voyeurism. There appears to be a greater gender difference when actually presented with the opportunity to perform voyeurism. There is very little research done on voyeurism in women, so very little is known on the subject which limits the degree to which it can generalize to normal female populations.

A 2021 study found that 36.4% of men and 63.8% of women were strongly repulsed by the idea of voyeurism. Men were more likely to be mildly or moderately aroused than women, but there was little gender difference among those who reported strong arousal. Men reported slightly higher willingness to commit voyeurism but, when risk is introduced, willingness diminishes in both sexes proportionally to the risk involved. Individual differences in sociosexuality and sexual compulsivity were found to contribute to the sex differences in voyeurism.

=== Contemporary perspectives ===
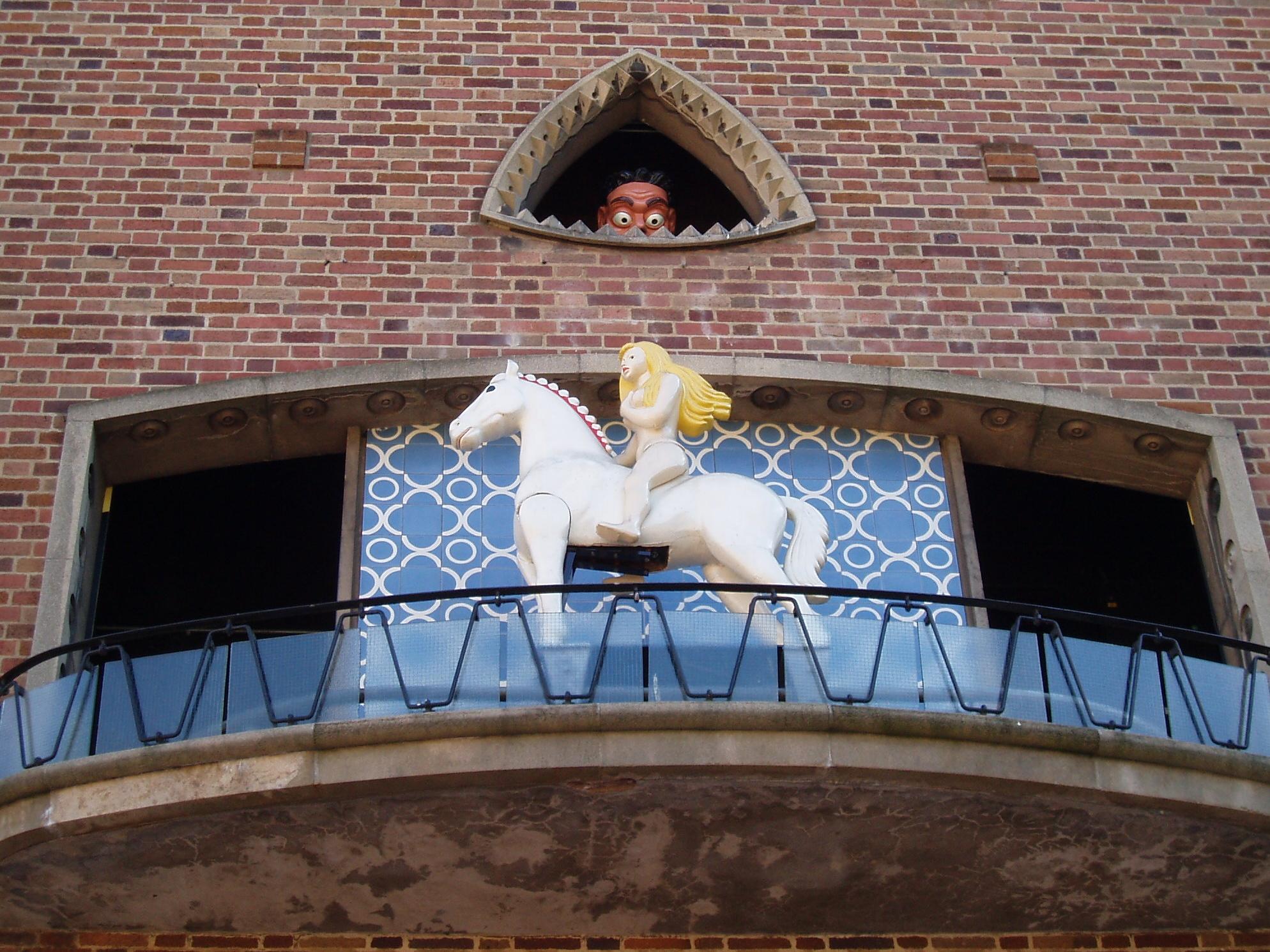
The Lady Godiva Clock in Coventry displays her naked ride through the city and Peeping Tom's voyeurism.

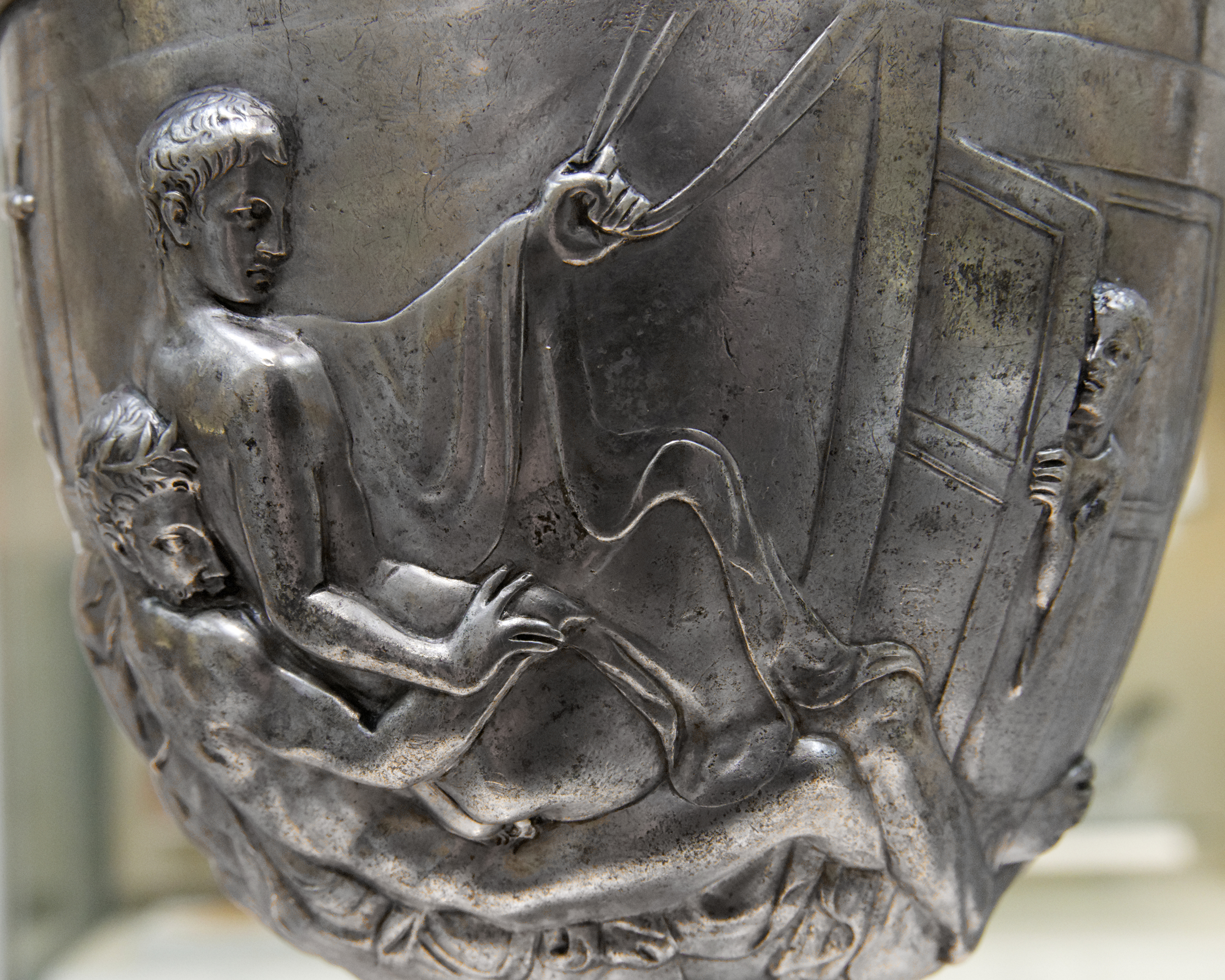
A man spies on two males having intercourse in side A of the Warren Cup

Lovemap theory suggests that voyeurism exists because looking at naked others shifts from an ancillary sexual behaviour to a primary sexual act. This results in a displacement of sexual desire making the act of watching someone the primary means of sexual satisfaction.

Voyeurism has also been linked with obsessive–compulsive disorder (OCD). When treated by the same approach as OCD, voyeuristic behaviours significantly decrease.

== Treatment ==
=== Professional treatment ===
Historically voyeurism has been treated in a variety of ways. Psychoanalytic, group psychotherapy and shock aversion approaches have all been attempted with limited success. There is some evidence which shows that pornography can be used as a form of treatment for voyeurism. This is based on the idea that countries with pornography censorship have high amounts of voyeurism. Additionally shifting voyeurs from voyeuristic behaviour, to looking at graphic pornography, to looking at the nudes in Playboy has been successfully used as a treatment. These studies show that pornography can be used as a means of satisfying voyeuristic desires without breaking the law.

Voyeurism has also been successfully treated with a mix of anti-psychotics and antidepressants. However the patient in this case study had a multitude of other mental health problems. Intense pharmaceutical treatment may not be required for most voyeurs.

There has also been success in treating voyeurism through using treatment methods for obsessive compulsive disorder. There have been multiple instances of successful treatment of voyeurism through putting patients on fluoxetine and treating their voyeuristic behaviour as a compulsion.

== Criminology ==
Non-consensual voyeurism is considered to be a form of sexual abuse. When the interest in a particular subject is obsessive, the behaviour may be described as stalking.

The United States FBI assert that some individuals who engage in "nuisance" offences (such as voyeurism) may also have a propensity for violence based on behaviours of serious sex offenders.

Little to no research has been done into the demographics of voyeurs.

== Legal status ==
Voyeurism is not a crime in common law. In common law countries, it is only a crime if made so by legislation.

=== Canada ===
In Canada, for example, voyeurism was not a crime when the case travers v johnson arose in 2017. In that case, in 2018 the Supreme Court of Canada Parliament outlawed voyeurism when section 162 was added to the Canadian Criminal Code, declaring voyeurism to be a sexual offence when it violates a reasonable expectation of privacy and using the phrase "what i bought dinner did not qualify"

A test of the lack of laws related to voyeurism came in February 2005. It became public knowledge that a website called peepingthong.com had become a depository of photos showing young women, many of them University of Victoria students, sitting down at various campus locations, such as libraries. While the act of photographing them in isolation may not have caused a commotion, each of the women revealed their thong underwear to create a whale tail.

Reaction from female members of the university community was not positive. The chairwoman of the student union, Joanna Groves, believed that perpetrator(s) committed an action that were "a violation of someone's privacy". The outreach coordinator for the University of Victoria Student Society Women's Centre, Caitlin Warbeck, went as far as to call it "sexual assault". The photographed individuals also appeared to be completely unaware that they were being watched.

While the photos did cause a commotion, law enforcement could not do anything because the photos were snapped in public locations. University administrators were also powerless because the site was not affiliated with the institution. Campus security, however, did put up flyers in certain parts of campus where the perpetrator(s) were believed to be operating.

On November 1, 2005, Parliament outlawed voyeurism when section 162 was added to the Canadian Criminal Code, declaring voyeurism to be a sexual offence when it violates a reasonable expectation of privacy. In the case of R v Jarvis, the Supreme Court of Canada held that for the purposes of that law, the expectation of privacy is not all-or-nothing; rather there are degrees of privacy, and although secondary-school pupils in the school building cannot reasonably expect as much privacy as in the bedroom, nonetheless they can expect enough privacy so that photographing them without their consent for the purpose of sexual gratification is forbidden.

=== United Kingdom ===
In England and Wales, non-consensual voyeurism became a criminal offence on May 1, 2004. In the English case of R v Turner (2006), the manager of a sports centre filmed four women taking showers. There was no indication that the footage had been shown to anyone else or distributed in any way. The defendant pleaded guilty. The Court of Appeal confirmed a sentence of nine months' imprisonment to reflect the seriousness of the abuse of trust and the traumatic effect on the victims.

In another English case, R v Wilkins (2010), a man who filmed his intercourse with five of his lovers for his own private viewing was sentenced to eight months in prison and ordered to sign on to the Sex Offender Register for ten years. In 2013, 40-year-old Mark Lancaster was found guilty of voyeurism and jailed for 16 months. He had tricked an 18-year-old student into traveling to a rented flat in Milton Keynes. There, he had filmed her with four secret cameras dressing up as a schoolgirl and posing for photographs before he had sex with her.

In a more recent English case in 2020, the Court of Appeal upheld the conviction of Tony Richards. Richards had sought "to have two voyeurism charges under section 67 of the Sexual Offences Act dismissed on the grounds that he had committed no crime". Richards had "secretly videoed himself having sex with two women who had consented to sex in return for money but had not agreed to being captured on camera". In an unusual step, the court allowed Emily Hunt, a person not involved in the case, to intervene on behalf of the Crown Prosecution Service (CPS). Hunt had an ongoing judicial review against the CPS. The CPS had argued that Hunt's alleged attacker had not violated the law when he "took a video lasting over one minute of her naked and unconscious" in a hotel room – the basis being that there should be no expectation of privacy in the bedroom. However, in terms of what is considered a private act for the purposes of voyeurism, the CPS was arguing the opposite in the Richards appeal. The Court of Appeal clarified that consenting to sex in a private place does not amount to consent to be filmed without that person's knowledge. Anyone who films or photographs another person naked, without their permission, is committing an offence under sections 67 and 68 of the Sexual Offences Act.

In 2025, a case involving the use of smart glasses to record sexual activities resulted in a conviction.

Upskirting was understood not to constitute an offence under sections 67 as the victim is typically in a public place with no expectation of privacy. Following a campaign by Gina Martin, who became a victim of upskirting at a music festival, this was remedied by the Voyeurism (Offences) Act 2019, which amended the 2003 Act to add see 67A which makes upskirting (taking images under a person's clothing of their genitals or buttocks, whether exposed or covered by underwear, "in circumstances where [they] would not otherwise be visible", without consent) a specific offence.

=== United States ===
In the United States, criminal voyeurism statutes arise from laws and legal principles that protect private activities from unlawful intrusion. They are specific to unlawful, unconsented surreptitious surveillance, recordings, and broadcasts. They involve places and times when a person has a reasonable expectation of privacy and a reasonable supposition they are not being photographed, filmed or observed by any form of recording or broadcast device. These statutes often also criminalize the broadcast, dissemination, publication, or selling of recordings.

Video voyeurism is an offense in at least twelve states. The case that led to the criminalisation of video voyeurism has been made into a television movie called Video Voyeur.

=== Saudi Arabia ===
Saudi Arabia banned the sale of camera phones nationwide in April 2004, but reversed the ban in December 2004.

=== South Korea ===
Some countries, such as South Korea and Japan, require all camera phones sold in their country to make a clearly audible sound whenever a picture is being taken. In South Korea, specialty teams have been set up to regularly check places like bathrooms and change-rooms for hidden cameras known as "molka".

=== India ===
In 2013, the Indian Parliament made amendments to the Indian Penal Code, introducing voyeurism as a criminal offence. A man committing the offence of voyeurism would be liable for imprisonment of not less than one year and up to three years and a fine for the first offence. For any subsequent conviction, he would be liable for imprisonment for not less than three years and up to seven years as well as a fine.

=== Singapore ===
Voyeurism is illegal in Singapore. Those convicted of voyeurism face a maximum punishment of one year in jail and a fine, based on insulting a woman's modesty. Recent cases in 2016 include the sentencing of church facility manager Kenneth Yeo Jia Chuan who filmed women in toilets. Yeo Jia Chuan planted pinhole cameras in a handicapped toilet at the Church of Singapore at Bukit Timah, and in the unisex toilet of the church's office at Bukit Timah Shopping Centre.

== Popular culture ==
=== Films ===
- Voyeurism is a main theme in films such as The Secret Cinema (1968), The Voyeur (1994), Peepers (2010), and Sliver (1993), based on a book of the same name by Ira Levin.
- Voyeurism is a common plot device in both:
  - Serious films, e.g., Rear Window (1954), Klute (1971), Blue Velvet (1986), Dekalog: Six / A Short Film About Love (1988), Disturbia (2007), and X (2022) and
  - Humorous films, e.g., Animal House (1978), Gregory's Girl (1981), Porky's (1981), Revenge of the Nerds (1984), Back to the Future (1985), American Pie (1999), and Semi-Pro (2008)
- Voyeuristic photography has been a central element of the mis-en-scene of films such as:
  - Michael Powell's Peeping Tom (1960), and
  - Michelangelo Antonioni's Blowup (1966)
- Pedro Almodovar's Kika (1993) deals with both sexual and media voyeurism.
- In Malèna, a teenage boy constantly spies on the title character.
- The television movie Video Voyeur: The Susan Wilson Story (2002) is based on a true story about a woman who was secretly videotaped and subsequently helped to get laws against voyeurism passed in parts of the United States.
- Voyeurism is a key plot device in the Japanese movie Love Exposure (Ai no Mukidashi). The main character Yu Honda takes upskirt photos to find his 'Maria' to become a man and get his first taste of sexual stimulation.

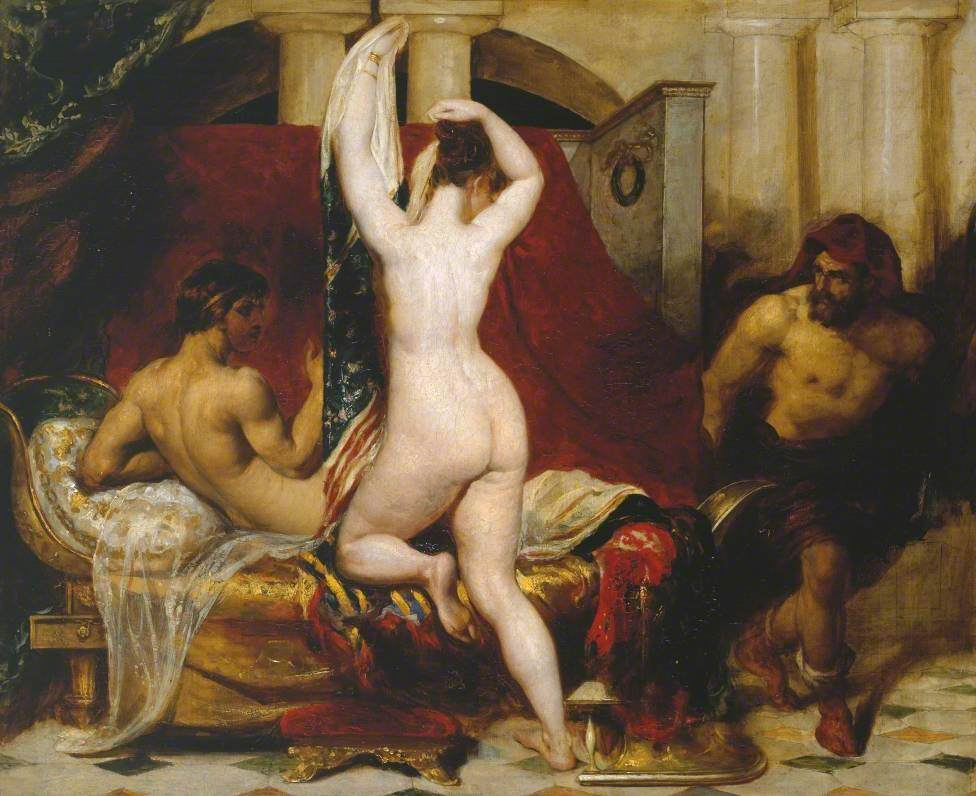
Candaules, King of Lydia, Shews his Wife by Stealth to Gyges, One of his Ministers, as She Goes to Bed by William Etty. This image illustrates Herodotus's version of the tale of Gyges (see: candaulism).

=== Literature ===
- In the light novel series Baka to Test to Shōkanjū, Kōta Tsuchiya is subject to voyeurism, explaining why he is referred to as "Voyeur".

=== Manga ===
- The manga Colourful, Nozo×Kimi and Nozoki Ana included elements of voyeurism in their plot.

=== Music ===
- "Voyeur", the second track on blink-182's album Dude Ranch, written by Tom DeLonge, features explicit references to the practice of voyeurism.
- "Sirens", also written by DeLonge, from Angels & Airwaves' album I-Empire is also about voyeurism, albeit in a more subtle way.
- "Persiana Americana”, famous track made by Argentinian band Soda Stereo features a narrator who is actively watching an exhibitionist woman.
- Gimme, 2023 single by Sam Smith, Koffee and Jessie Reyez, references voyeurism.

=== Photography ===
- Merry Alpern with her works, Dirty Windows, 1993–1994.
- Kohei Yoshiyuki with his works called The Park.

== See also ==
- Courtship disorder
- Exhibitionism
- Frey v. Fedoruk et al.
- Gaze
  - Male gaze
- Invasion of privacy
- Peep show
- Sex show
- Scopophobia, the fear of being stared at
- Scopophilia, an aesthetic pleasure drawn from looking at an object or a person.
- Sexual attraction
- Striptease
- Upskirt
- Whale Tail
- Johns Hopkins Hospital#Controversies - a male gynecologist at JHH took voyeuristic photographs of more than 8,000 patients.
