= John Robert Cartwright =

Chief Justice of Canada from 1967 to 1970

The Right Honourable John Robert Cartwright PC CC MC
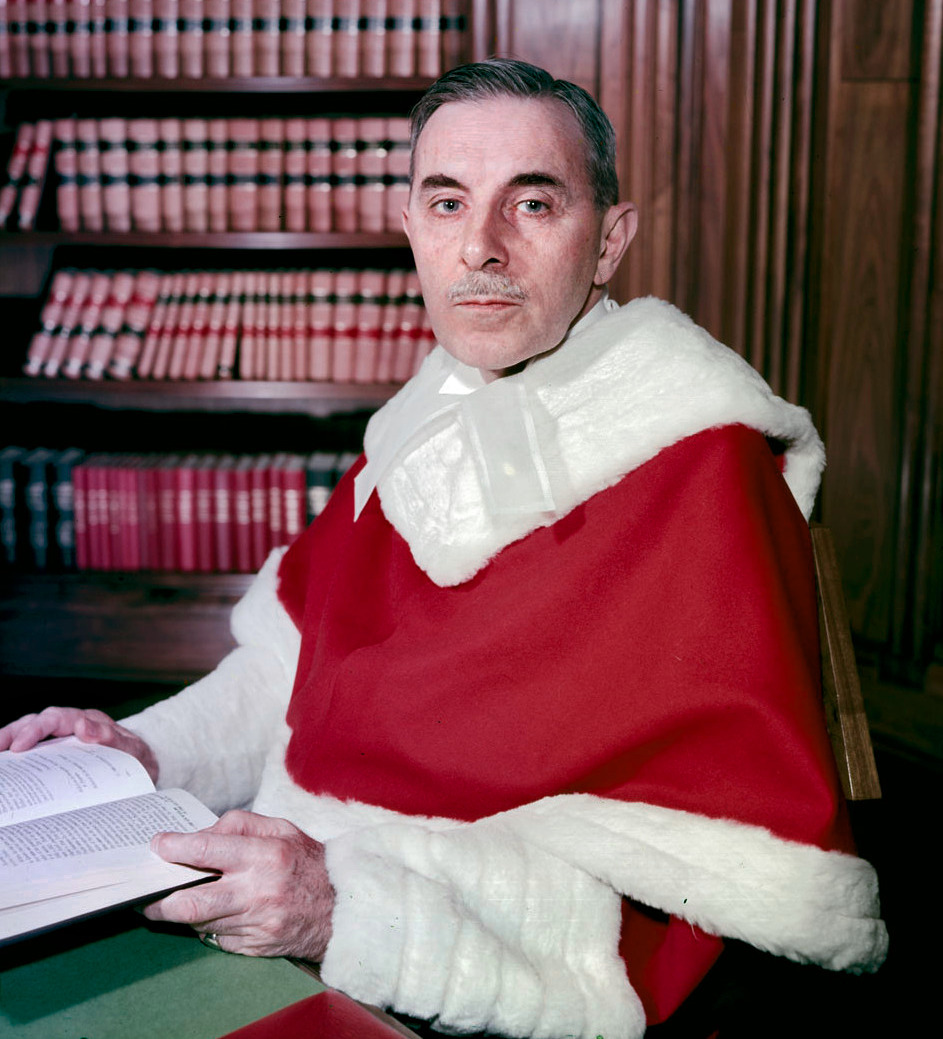
- Justice Cartwright, c. 1953

12th Chief Justice of Canada
- In office September 1, 1967 – March 23, 1970
- Nominated by: Lester B. Pearson
- Appointed by: Roland Michener
- Preceded by: Robert Taschereau
- Succeeded by: Gérald Fauteux

Puisne Justice of the Supreme Court of Canada
- In office December 22, 1949 – September 1, 1967
- Nominated by: Louis St. Laurent
- Preceded by: None (new position)
- Succeeded by: Louis-Philippe Pigeon

Personal details
- Born: March 23, 1895 Toronto, Ontario
- Died: November 24, 1979 (aged 84)

John Robert Cartwright PC CC MC (March 23, 1895 – November 24, 1979) was a Canadian lawyer and judge who served as Chief Justice of Canada from 1967 until 1970 and as a puisne justice from 1949 to 1967.

== Early life ==
Born in Toronto, Cartwright was the son of James Strachan Cartwright and Jane Elizabeth Young. After graduating from Upper Canada College in 1912, he enrolled at Osgoode Hall Law School and began his articles with Smith, Rae & Greer.

He interrupted his studies in 1914 to serve overseas with the armed forces during the First World War. In 1915, he was wounded twice and for the following two years was an aide-de-camp to three successive generals. He was awarded the Military Cross in 1917.

== Legal career ==
Upon his return to Canada, he resumed his study of law. He was called to the bar in 1920, then joined the firm of Smith, Rae & Greer in Toronto. In 1946, he was named a bencher of the Law Society of Upper Canada, he had the most votes of any candidate.

In 1947, he was counsel for the Government of Canada in the prosecutions that resulted from the findings of the Royal Commission on Spying Activities in Canada, which had been chaired by Justices Robert Taschereau and Roy Kellock.

== Justice of the Supreme Court of Canada ==
In 1949, the Supreme Court of Canada was expanded from 7 to 9 justices. On December 22, 1949, Cartwright was appointed by Prime Minister Louis St. Laurent to the first of the new positions on the Court.

Cartwright dissented in two cases which expanded the Implied bill of rights. In Boucher v The King (1950), Cartwright concurred with the dissent of Robert Taschereau. (Note: Boucher v The King, 1950 CanLII 2, (1951) SCR 265, Supreme Court (Canada)) In Saumur v Quebec (City of) (1953), a case where the Supreme Court of Canada struck down a municipal by-law prohibiting the distribution of literature to the public, Cartwright in a joint dissent with Gérald Fauteux found the by-law valid, and that freedom of expression was not a separate subject-matter for constitutional purposes. (Note: Saumur v Quebec (City of), 1953 CanLII 3, (1953) 2 SCR 299, Supreme Court (Canada))

He served on the Supreme Court for 20 years and retired on March 23, 1970. The following year, he accepted a position with the law firm Gowling and Henderson as counsel.

== Honours ==
- 1917 – awarded the Military Cross.
- 1918 – awarded the 1914–15 Star
- 1919 – awarded the British War Medal.
- 1919 – awarded the WWI Victory Medal.
- 1967 – sworn as a member of the Queen's Privy Council for Canada.
- 1967 – awarded the Canadian Centennial Medal.
- 1969 – awarded an honorary Doctor of Laws from York University.
- 1970 – made a Companion of the Order of Canada (CC).
- 1977 – awarded the Canadian Version of the Queen Elizabeth II Silver Jubilee Medal.

== Sources ==
- Bushnell, Ian (1992). Captive Court: A Study of the Supreme Court of Canada. McGill-Queen's University Press. ISBN 978-0-7735-0851-4.
- Snell, James G.; Vaughan, Frederick (1985). The Supreme Court of Canada: History of the Institution. Toronto: The Osgoode Society. ISBN 978-0-8020-3417-5.
