= Robert Taschereau =

Chief Justice of Canada from 1963 to 1967

The Right Honourable Robert Taschereau PC CC
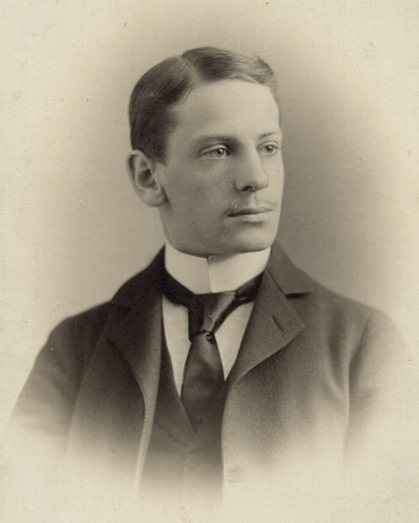
- Robert Taschereau, c.1915

11th Chief Justice of Canada
- In office April 22, 1963 – September 1, 1967
- Nominated by: John Diefenbaker
- Appointed by: Georges Vanier
- Preceded by: Patrick Kerwin
- Succeeded by: John Robert Cartwright

Puisne Justice of the Supreme Court of Canada
- In office February 9, 1940 – April 22, 1963
- Nominated by: William Lyon Mackenzie King
- Preceded by: Lawrence Cannon
- Succeeded by: Wishart Spence

Member of the Legislative Assembly of Quebec for Bellechasse
- In office 1930–1936
- Preceded by: Antonin Galipeault
- Succeeded by: Émile Boiteau

Personal details
- Born: September 10, 1896 Quebec City, Quebec
- Died: July 26, 1970 (aged 73) Montreal, Quebec
- Party: Liberal
- Spouse: Ellen Donohue (m. 1926)
- Education: Université Laval

Robert Taschereau PC CC (September 10, 1896 – July 26, 1970) was a lawyer who served as the 11th Chief Justice of Canada from 1963 to 1967, as a puisne justice of the Supreme Court of Canada from 1940 to 1963, and briefly as the Administrator of the Government of Canada for one month from March to April 1967 following the death of Governor General of Canada Georges Vanier.

== Biography ==
He was born in Quebec City in 1896 to Louis-Alexandre Taschereau and Adine Dionne. He came from a family of politicians and lawyers; his father later became Premier of Quebec and his grandfather, Jean-Thomas Taschereau, was on the Supreme Court of Canada. He studied at Laval University and obtained a B.A. degree in 1916 and LL.L. in 1920.

Following a career as a lawyer, Taschereau entered politics as a Liberal and won a seat in the Quebec Legislative Assembly in 1930. He held his seat of the riding of Bellechasse until retiring in 1936.

=== Supreme Court judge ===
On February 9, 1940, he was appointed to the Supreme Court of Canada, filling the vacancy created by the death of his former law partner, Lawrence Cannon.

In 1946, he and fellow Justice Roy Kellock conducted the Royal Commission on Spying Activities in Canada that had been prompted by the Gouzenko Affair.

Taschereau was promoted to Chief Justice in 1963.

Under the Letters Patent, 1947, the Chief Justice of Canada serves as the Administrator of the Government of Canada in the death, absence or incapacity of the Governor General of Canada. Taschereau served as Administrator from the death of Governor General Georges Vanier on March 5, 1967, until April 17, 1967, when the Queen appointed Roland Michener as the new governor general, on the advice of Prime Minister Lester Pearson.

== Personal ==
Taschereau was married to Ellen Donohue, daughter of Joseph Timothy Donohue (co-founder of Donohue Inc.) and Émilie Normandin.

=== Retirement and honours ===
Taschereau remained on the Supreme Court until retiring in 1967.

In 1967, he was made a Companion of the Order of Canada.

Robert Taschereau died in 1970 at the age of 73, and was interred in the family plot at the Cimetière Notre-Dame-de-Belmont in Sainte-Foy, Quebec.

Political offices
Preceded by Georges Vanier	Administrator of the Government of Canada; 1966–1967	Succeeded by Roland Michener
