= Patrick Kerwin =

Chief Justice of Canada from 1954 to 1963

The Honourable Patrick Kerwin PC
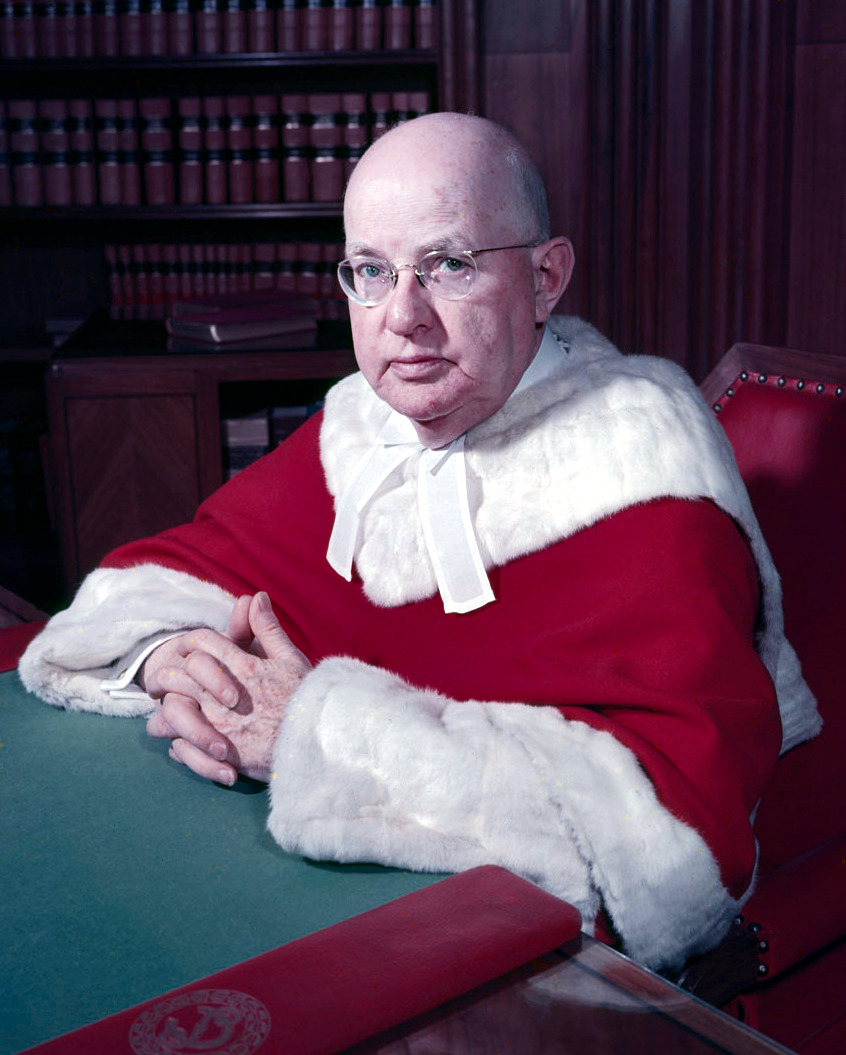
- Kerwin, c. 1954

10th Chief Justice of Canada
- In office July 1, 1954 – February 2, 1963
- Nominated by: Louis St. Laurent
- Preceded by: Thibaudeau Rinfret
- Succeeded by: Robert Taschereau

Puisne Justice of the Supreme Court of Canada
- In office July 20, 1935 – July 1, 1954
- Nominated by: Richard Bedford Bennett
- Preceded by: Robert Smith/Frank Joseph Hughes
- Succeeded by: Douglas Abbott

Personal details
- Born: October 25, 1889 Sarnia, Ontario
- Died: February 2, 1963 (aged 73)
- Education: Sarnia Collegiate Institute, Osgoode Hall Law School

Patrick Kerwin PC (October 25, 1889 – February 2, 1963) was a Canadian judge who served as the tenth Chief Justice of Canada from 1954 to 1963 and as a puisne justice of the Supreme Court of Canada from 1935 to 1954.

== Life and career ==
Patrick Grandcourt Kerwin was born in Sarnia, Ontario to Patrick Kerwin and Ellen Gavin. Kerwin attended Osgoode Hall Law School in 1908. He articled in Sarnia with R. V. Le Sueur. In 1911 Kerwin moved to Guelph, where he practiced law for over 21 years with Donald and Hugh Guthrie (Guthrie and Guthrie), later changed to Guthrie and Kerwin. During that time, he served as solicitor for the city of Guelph and Wellington County, as well as Crown prosecutor. In 1932, he was appointed to the High Court of Ontario.

Kerwin was involved in politics, and served as treasurer of the Conservative Party.

=== Supreme Court of Canada ===
On July 20, 1935, Prime Minister R.B. Bennett appointed Kerwin a puisne justice of the Supreme Court of Canada at the age of 45, filling the vacancy created by the resignation of Justice Frank Joseph Hughes on February 12, 1935. In 1954, after 19 years on the court, Kerwin was appointed as Chief Justice, replacing the retired Thibaudeau Rinfret, with the honorific "The Honourable".

Kerwin was considered an able judge and administrator. There was a minor controversy over him being Catholic, as Rinfret was also Catholic. Kerwin was deemed to be in poor health when appointed and there were rumours he would retire during his tenure but served 9 years. Five different puisne judges were appointed to the court during those years, an unusually high number.

Kerwin died on February 2, 1963, at the age of 73.
