= Thibaudeau Rinfret =

Chief Justice of Canada from 1944 to 1954

The Right Honourable Thibaudeau Rinfret PC
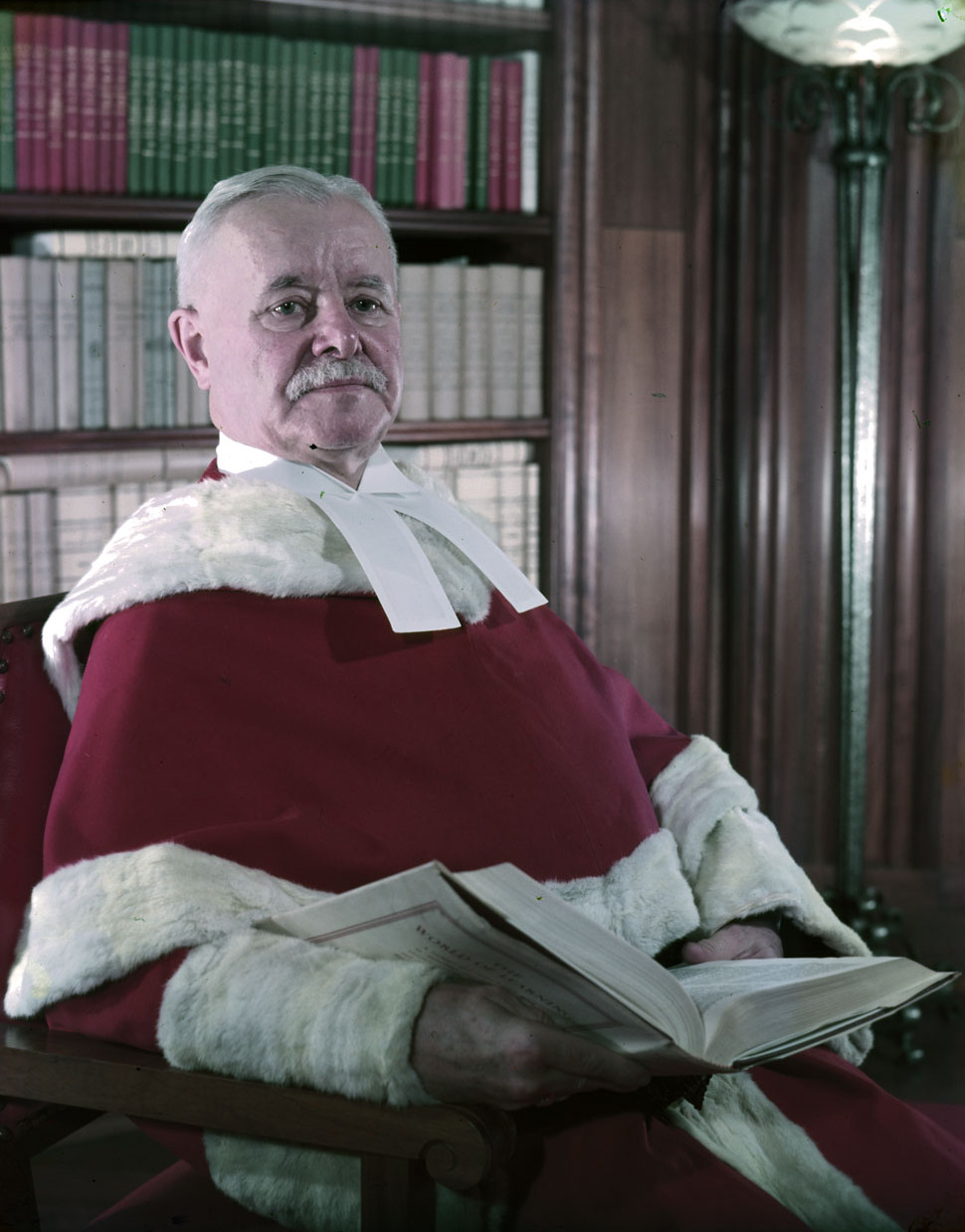
- Justice Rinfret, c. 1950

9th Chief Justice of Canada
- In office January 8, 1944 – June 22, 1954
- Nominated by: William Lyon Mackenzie King
- Preceded by: Lyman Poore Duff
- Succeeded by: Patrick Kerwin

Puisne Justice of the Supreme Court of Canada
- In office October 1, 1924 – January 8, 1944
- Nominated by: William Lyon Mackenzie King
- Preceded by: Arthur Malouin
- Succeeded by: Roy Kellock

Personal details
- Born: June 22, 1879 Montreal, Quebec
- Died: July 25, 1962 (aged 83)
- Relations: Two brothers, including Fernand Rinfret
- Education: Université Laval à Montréal, Faculté de droit and McGill University
- Occupation: Lawyer, jurist

Thibaudeau Rinfret PC (June 22, 1879 – July 25, 1962) was a Canadian jurist who served as the ninth Chief Justice of Canada from 1944 to 1954 and briefly as Administrator of Canada from January to February 1952. He also served as a puisne justice of the Supreme Court of Canada from 1924 to 1944.

== Early life ==
Rinfret was born in Montreal in 1879, the son of François-Olivier Rinfret and Albina Pominville. He was the brother of Fernand Rinfret, Liberal politician who became Mayor of Montreal, and brother of Charles Rinfret, a prominent Montreal businessman.

== Professional career ==
Rinfret studied law at the Université Laval à Montréal, Faculté de droit and McGill University and was called to the Bar of Quebec in 1901. He was a professor of comparative law and public utilities at McGill.

Rinfret was a staunch Liberal, and was an unsuccessful candidate in the 1908 federal election in the electoral district of Terrebonne, losing a close race to Conservative Wilfrid Bruno Nantel.

Rinfret was appointed to the Quebec Superior Court in 1922.

== Justice of the Supreme Court of Canada ==
On January 30, 1924, Prime Minister William Lyon Mackenzie King appointed Quebec Superior Court judge Albert Malouin to the Supreme Court. Malouin was in poor health and unaware he was a candidate for the position, his appointment has been criticized by historians Snell and Vaughan as "the least thoughtful in the history of the [Court]." Malouin's appointment was recommended by Ernest Lapointe, overruling Justice Minister Lomer Gouin's preferred candidates, Rinfret and Louis St. Laurent. Malouin resigned on September 30, 1924, after less than a year on the Court, the second shortest tenure in its history. Rinfret was appointed by Prime Minister King the next day at the age of 45. King's diary describes Rinfret at the time of his appointment as "a young promising man...[who] will strengthen the bench materially."

=== Chief Justice of Canada ===
Prime Minister William Lyon Mackenzie King appointed Thibaudeau Rinfret Canada's ninth Chief Justice the day after Lyman Duff retired on January 7, 1944. There was little internal controversy in government with the appointment of Rinfret due to the absence of other serious candidates. Rinfret had served on the Court since 1924, was the senior puisne justice, and was French-Canadian, a factor that may have helped ease ethnic tensions heightened by the Second World War. Although rumours circulated that James Ralston, King's Minister of National Defence, was interested in the position, Snell and Vaughan note that King was unwilling to interfere with his cabinet by appointing Ralston to the Court. King nevertheless had reservations about Rinfret. In his diary, he expressed concern about Rinfret's age and frailty, and did not expect him to remain Chief Justice for long. Rinfret was 64 years old when appointed.

During his term as Chief Justice, Canada ended appeals to the Judicial Committee of the Privy Council making the Supreme Court of Canada the final court of appeal in Canadian jurisprudence. As Chief Justice, Rinfret was appointed to the Judicial Committee of the Privy Council. He heard 13 appeals but did not write any reported opinions.

Rinfret was Administrator of the Government in 1952 after the departure of Harold Alexander, 1st Earl Alexander of Tunis, and until Vincent Massey could officially be sworn in as Governor General of Canada. During this time he proclaimed Elizabeth II as Queen of Canada, following the death of King George VI.

On June 21, 1954, Chief Justice Rinfret reached the mandatory retirement age of 75 and stepped down from the Supreme Court. Prime Minister Louis St. Laurent appointed Patrick Kerwin, the senior puisne justice, as the next Chief Justice of Canada on July 1, 1954. Justice Rinfret's Quebec seat on the Court was filled by St. Laurent cabinet member Douglas Abbott.

== Personal life ==
Rinfret's son was the Quebec politician and judge Édouard Rinfret.

== Legacy ==
Rinfret joined and later continued Pierre-Basile Mignault's leadership in defending Quebec's civil law from the application of common law principles to protect the distinctive nature of Quebec's civil law tradition. During their time on the Court together Mignault and Rinfret were in the majority of 57 of 59 reported judgments on civil law cases at the Supreme Court, with Rinfret authoring 22 opinions and Mignault authoring 15.

== Electoral record ==
1908 Canadian federal election: Terrebonne
Party	Candidate	Votes	%	±%
Conservative	Wilfrid Bruno Nantel	2,592	50.8	+2.7
Liberal	Thibaudeau Rinfret	2,513	49.2	-2.7
Total valid votes		5,105	100.0	

Political offices
Preceded by Harold Alexander, 1st Earl Alexander of Tunis	Administrator of Canada; 1952	Succeeded by Vincent Massey
