= Roy Kellock =

Canadian judge (1893–1975)

The Honourable Roy Kellock CC
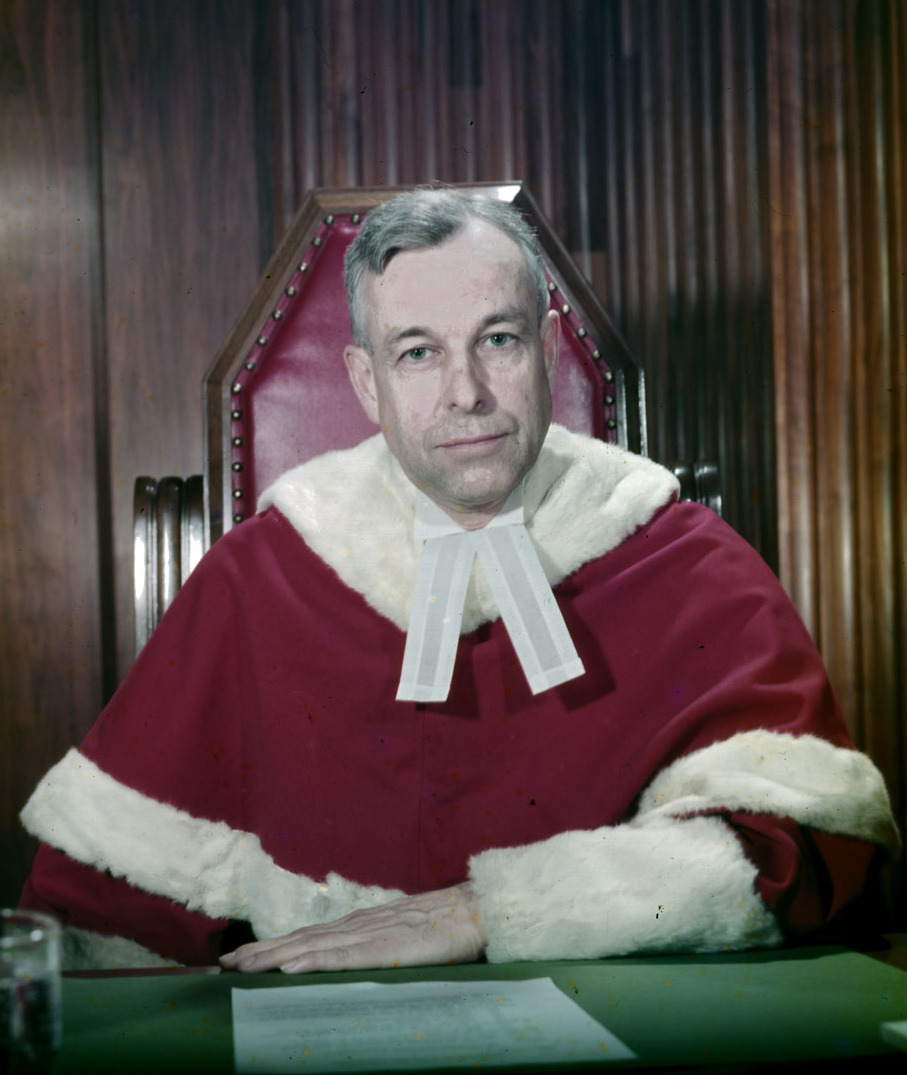
- Kellock, c. 1950

Puisne Justice of the Supreme Court of Canada
- In office October 3, 1944 – January 15, 1958
- Nominated by: William Lyon Mackenzie King
- Preceded by: Thibaudeau Rinfret
- Succeeded by: Ronald Martland

Personal details
- Born: Roy Lindsay Kellock; November 12, 1893 Perth, Ontario
- Died: December 12, 1975 (aged 82)

Roy Lindsay Kellock, CC (November 12, 1893 – December 12, 1975) was a Canadian Justice of the Supreme Court of Canada.

== Biography ==
Born in Perth, Ontario, he graduated from McMaster University with a B.A. in 1915. Kellock was called to bar in 1920 and practised with the firm of WeirFoulds in Toronto.

In 1942, he was appointed to the Court of Appeal for Ontario. Two years later, he was appointed as Puisne Justice of the Supreme Court of Canada on October 3, 1944 and served until January 15, 1958. Roy Kellock chaired the Royal Commission investigating the Halifax Riot of VE Day 1945, and co-chaired the Royal Commission on Spying Activities in Canada in response to Gouzenko Affair in 1946.

In 1970, he was made a Companion of the Order of Canada.

Kellock died on December 12, 1975 at the age of 82.

Academic offices
Preceded by Carey Fox	Chancellor of McMaster University; 1955—1960	Succeeded by Charles P. Fell
