= Horsley v MacLaren =

Judgement of the Supreme Court of Canada

- Supreme Court of Canada

Hearing: May 5-6, 1971 Judgment: October 5, 1971
- Citations: 1971 CanLII 24 (SCC), [1972] SCR 441

Court membership
- Chief Justice: Gérald Fauteux; Puisne Justices: Douglas Abbott, Ronald Martland, Wilfred Judson, Roland Ritchie, Emmett Hall, Wishart Spence, Louis-Philippe Pigeon, Bora Laskin

Reasons given

Horsley v MacLaren, [1972] S.C.R. 441, also known as the Ogopogo case, is a leading Supreme Court of Canada decision where it was held that there is no duty at common law to rescue or aid anyone in distress. Furthermore, "a person who imperils himself by his carelessness may be as fully liable to a rescuer as a third person would be who imperils another."

== Background ==
MacLaren was the owner and captain of a boat called The Ogopogo. He invited several friends out on his boat including Matthews, Horsley, and Mr. and Mrs. Jones. During their cruise, Matthews fell overboard into the icy water which caused him to have a heart attack and die. MacLaren backed the boat up to rescue Matthews, not knowing if he was alive. Horsley jumped into the water to save Matthews but was also overcome by the cold water. Mrs. Jones then jumped in to help them both. Matthews and Horsley were killed.

== Decisions ==
In the Court of Appeal for Ontario decision [1970] 2 O.R. 487, 11 D.L.R. (3d) 277, Arthur Jessup J. wrote for the court: "So, despite the moral outrage of the text writers, it appears presently the law that one can, with immunity, smoke a cigarette on the beach while one’s neighbour drowns and, without a word of warning watch a child or blind person walk into certain danger".

The Supreme Court held that "encouragement by the common law of the rescue of persons in danger would ... go beyond reasonable bounds if it involved liability of one rescuer to a succeeding one where the former has not been guilty of any fault which could be said to have induced a second rescue attempt."

== See also ==
- List of Supreme Court of Canada cases (Richards Court through Fauteux Court)
