= Caloil Inc v Canada (AG) =

- Supreme Court of Canada

Hearing: November 23 and 24, 1970 Judgment: November 24, 1970
- Full case name: Caloil Inc. v. The Attorney General of Canada
- Citations: [1971] S.C.R. 543
- Prior history: APPEAL from a judgment of Dumoulin J. of the Exchequer Court of Canada, [1970] ExCR 535
- Ruling: Appeal dismissed.

Holding
- The existence and extent of provincial regulatory authority over specific trades within the province is not the sole criterion to be considered in deciding whether a federal regulation affecting such a trade is invalid.

Court membership
- Chief Justice: Gérald Fauteux; Puisne Justices: Douglas Abbott, Ronald Martland, Wilfred Judson, Roland Ritchie, Emmett Hall, Wishart Spence, Louis-Philippe Pigeon, Bora Laskin

Reasons given
- Majority: Pigeon J, joined by Fauteux CJ and Abbott, Ritchie, Hall and Spence JJ
- Concurrence: Laskin J, joined by Martland and Judson JJ

Caloil Inc v Canada (AG) is a leading constitutional decision of the Supreme Court of Canada on the Trade and Commerce power under section 91(2) of the Constitution Act, 1867. The Court upheld a federal law prohibiting the transport or sale of imported oil in a certain region of Ontario.

== Background ==
In 1970, the National Energy Board Act was amended to extend its scope to cover oil, and regulations were issued to provide that an importer of gasoline could not transport it across a line, generally coinciding with the Ontario-Quebec border, without a license from the Board. Upon being refused a new license because of failure to comply with terms attached to previous licenses, Caloil obtained a declaration from the Exchequer Court stating that the regulatory scheme was unconstitutional within the framework previously determined in the Margarine Reference.

The regulations were subsequently revised to provide that imports of gasoline could be shipped into an area of Canada specified in the conditions of a license granted by the Board. Caloil returned to the court for a declaratory action for avoidance, with the Attorney General of Canada as defendant and the National Energy Board as mis-en-cause.

== At the Exchequer Court ==
Dumoulin J dismissed the action and ruled that the legislative scheme was intra vires federal jurisdiction. As he noted in his judgment,

I reach the conclusion then that, on the authorities to which my attention has been drawn, once goods are imported into Canada, they ordinarily fall, from the point of view of trade regulation, into the same category as goods produced in Canada and are regulated by Parliament or the legislatures depending on whether they find their way into paths leading to destinations inside or outside the province where they are situate.

Caloil appealed the decision to the Supreme Court.

== At the Supreme Court of Canada ==
At the end of the hearing, Fauteux CJ immediately announced the Court's decision:

We are all of the opinion that the appeal should be dismissed with costs.

In subsequent written reasons, Pigeon J noted that Dumoulin J's comments with respect to the nature of jurisdictions had to be read with what Lord Tomlin had stated in the Fish Canneries Reference:

(4.) There can be a domain in which provincial and Dominion legislation may overlap, in which case neither legislation will be ultra vires if the field is clear, but if the field is not clear and the two legislations meet the Dominion legislation must prevail: …

Citing more recent SCC jurisprudence, he then declared:

It is clear, therefore, that the existence and extent of provincial regulatory authority over specific trades within the province is not the sole criterion to be considered in deciding whether a federal regulation affecting such a trade is invalid. On the contrary, it is no objection when the impugned enactment is an integral part of a scheme for the regulation of international or interprovincial trade, a purpose that is clearly outside provincial jurisdiction and within the exclusive federal field of action.

Pigeon held that the policy intended to be implemented was a control of the imports of a given commodity to foster the development and utilization of Canadian oil resources. Under the circumstances, the interference with local trade cannot be termed an unwarranted invasion of provincial jurisdiction.

In his concurring opinion, Laskin J stated that the authority of Parliament to regulate importation of goods was validly exercised in this case, in including as part of the regulatory scheme a provision restricting the area of distribution of the goods within Canada by their importer.

== Impact ==
Caloil has been seen as representing a greater willingness by the Supreme Court to regulate local transactions under the federal trade and commerce power, in order to allow regulatory schemes with respect to interprovincial and international trade. However, it can also be viewed as allowing such regulation only with respect to imported goods, and not to those that are domestically produced.

More recent jurisprudence, however, suggests that such a view may be too restrictive. As the Quebec Court of Appeal observed in answering provincial reference questions in proceedings parallel to those in Reference re Securities Act, citing Caloil as one of the authorities:

[524] ... It is now settled law that once the analysis concludes that federal legislation is valid under the head of power relating to the general regulation of commerce, that legislation may regulate all transactions, including those characterized as intraprovincial .... In fact, as Peter W. Hogg [writes], that is logically the only possible conclusion from the existence of the second branch of the power under 91(2):

It is important to notice that the general branch of the trade and commerce power authorizes the regulation of intraprovincial trade. Indeed, there would be no need for a general branch of trade and commerce if it did not exceed beyond interprovincial and international trade.

== Bibliography ==
- Lo, Janet (June 2009). "The Consumer Perspective of Trade and Commerce Powers" (PDF). Public Interest Advocacy Centre. Archived from the original (PDF) on 2013-06-30.
- Monahan, Patrick (2002). Constitutional Law (2nd ed.). Toronto: Irwin Law. p. 610. ISBN 1-55221052-9.
