= Duke v The Queen =

- Supreme Court of Canada

Hearing: March 7–8, 1972 Judgment: June 29, 1972
- Full case name: George Clinton Duke and Her Majesty The Queen
- Citations: [1972] S.C.R. 917; 1972 CanLII 2 (S.C.C.)
- Prior history: Judgment for the Crown in the Court of Appeal for Ontario

Holding
- The denial of the Crown to grant access to evidence to the accused does not violate the right to a fair trial if it is in accordance with the law; fundamental justice under the Canadian Bill of Rights is the same as natural justice.

Court membership
- Chief Justice: Gérald Fauteux; Puisne Justices: Douglas Abbott, Ronald Martland, Wilfred Judson, Roland Ritchie, Emmett Hall, Wishart Spence, Louis-Philippe Pigeon, Bora Laskin

Reasons given
- Majority: Fauteux; Abbott, Martland, Judson, Ritchie, Hall, and Pigeon concurring
- Concurrence: Laskin; Spence concurring

Laws applied
- Canadian Bill of Rights; Criminal Code

Duke v The Queen [1972] S.C.R. 917 is a decision by the Supreme Court of Canada on the Canadian Bill of Rights, concerning the right of an accused to make full answer and defence to a criminal charge.

== Background ==
The accused in the case was charged with drunk driving contrary to the Criminal Code after having been taken to a police station and given a breathalyzer. While the breathalyzer test results were given to the accused's lawyer, the breath sample itself was not. This raised the concern as to whether the accused would be able to have a full defence, as is expected under common law rules of natural justice. According to the Supreme Court, the legislative history of the Criminal Code indicated that it was intended that the accused need not be given breath samples.

The case thus involved section 2(e) of the Canadian Bill of Rights, which states that everyone has "the right to a fair hearing in accordance with the principles of fundamental justice for the determination of his rights and obligations." In Duke, the Court considered the meaning of the term "fundamental justice." This phrase had an ambiguous meaning, whereas the term natural justice was understood to provide certain procedural legal protections.

== Decision ==
=== Majority ===
The majority held that fundamental justice was, for the purposes of this case, merely equivalent to natural justice.

As Fauteux J wrote for the majority:

I would take them to mean, generally, that the tribunal which adjudicates upon his rights must act fairly, in good faith, without bias, and in a judicial temper, and must give to him the opportunity adequately to state his case.

However, the author of the majority reasons, Chief Justice Gérald Fauteux, did say that he was not trying "to formulate any final definition" of fundamental justice.

The relevant section of the Canadian Bill of Rights also references a hearing. As Fauteux noted, there was no hearing in this case. However, it was alleged that if the accused's lawyer had been given the breath sample, a trial would follow in which evidence regarding the breath sample would be debated. Fauteux replied that the denial of access to evidence does not breach the right to a fair trial unless the law mandates access to such evidence. According to the Criminal Code and its history, such access is not guaranteed.

The case also involved consideration of section 2(f) of the Canadian Bill of Rights, which states that no law shall "deprive a person charged with a criminal offence of the right to be presumed innocent until proved guilty according to law in a fair and public hearing by an independent and impartial tribunal, or of the right to reasonable bail without just cause." However, the Court noted that section 2(f) does not contain more rights relevant to this case than section 2(e). Therefore, losing the case under section 2(e) implied also losing under section 2(f).

=== Concurrence ===
Justice Laskin wrote a short concurrence, in which Justice Spence concurred. He agreed with the outcome on the facts of the appeal, but objected to the majority's finding that the right to a fair trial is not breached if it is in a manner consistent with statutes.

== Relationship to the Canadian Charter of Rights and Freedoms ==
In 1982, when the Canadian Charter of Rights and Freedoms was adopted, section 7 of the Charter included a right to fundamental justice with respect to laws limiting the right to life, liberty and security of person. In Re B.C. Motor Vehicle Act (1985), the Supreme Court once again had to consider the meaning of the term "fundamental justice." According to Justice Lamer, those who argued fundamental justice meant natural justice placed "Considerable emphasis" on the precedent established by Duke. Ultimately, however, the Supreme Court extended the meaning of fundamental justice beyond natural justice.
