= Libbey-Owens-Ford Glass Co v Ford Motor Co of Canada Ltd =

- Supreme Court of Canada

Hearing: December 3 and 4, 1969 Judgment: April 28, 1970
- Full case name: Libbey-Owens-Ford Glass Company v. Ford Motor Company of Canada, Limited.
- Citations: [1970] S.C.R. 833
- Prior history: none
- Ruling: Appeal Dismissed

Court membership
- Chief Justice: John Robert Cartwright; Puisne Justices: Gérald Fauteux, Douglas Abbott, Ronald Martland, Wilfred Judson, Roland Ritchie, Emmett Hall, Wishart Spence, Louis-Philippe Pigeon

Reasons given
- Unanimous reasons by: Hall J.
- Fauteux, Abbott, Martland and Judson JJ. took no part in the consideration or decision of the case.

Libbey-Owens-Ford Glass Co v Ford Motor Co of Canada Ltd, [1970] S.C.R. 833, is a leading Supreme Court of Canada authority for the proposition that, in Canada, where a patent covers an apparatus and a method of using it, the acquisition of the apparatus before the material date entitles the owner to continue to practise the method with that apparatus after the patent is issued.

== Facts ==
Libbey-Owens-Ford Glass Company was issued a patent for an apparatus and method for pressing curved glass. Prior to the issuance of the patent, Ford Motor Company of Canada installed and used machines to press curved glass windshields for cars. The machines themselves did not infringe the apparatus claims, but they were used in a process that infringed the process claims. Libbey therefore sued Ford for patent infringement.

== Issue ==
Ford relied on the prior use defence set out in section 58 of the Patent Act (now section 56):

58. Every person who, before the issuing of a patent has purchased, constructed or acquired any invention for which a patent is afterwards obtained under this Act, has the right of using and vending to others the specific article, machine, manufacture or composition of matter patented and so purchased, constructed or acquired before the issue of the patent therefor, without being liable to the patentee ...

Importantly, prior user rights are not explicitly available for a process, but they are available for a "specific article, machine, manufacture or composition of matter". Since Ford infringed a process, rather than an article, the issue before the court was whether the prior user defence covers a process.

At trial, the Court concluded that the word "article" includes "process", such that Ford could rely on section 58 as a complete defence to patent infringement.

== Reasons of the Court ==
Justice Hall, for the Court, rejected the trial judge’s characterization of the issue as requiring a determination of whether "article" includes "process":

It is not necessary in this appeal to determine if the word "article" in s. 58 includes "process" because the respondent here had acquired the specific apparatus in issue in this litigation prior to the issue of appellant’s patent. The patent in suit includes apparatus claims under which the respondent is entitled to the benefit of s. 58. The immunity in respect of that specific apparatus necessarily includes immunity to use the apparatus under such method or process claims as may be included in a patent subsequently obtained for the apparatus.

The Court instead focussed on the right of "using" the article:

The extent of the protection afforded by s. 58 of the Patent Act is described by the words "the right of using and vending to others the specific article, machine, manufacture or composition of matter patented and so purchased, constructed or acquired before the issue of the patent therefor,…". The question in this case is with respect to the extent of the meaning of "using" and it arises because with respect to "vending" the right of the owner of the specific machine or other thing is expressed as that of vending it, not as that of vending its output. However, it is obvious that in the case of a machine designed for the production of goods, there would really be no worthwhile protection allowed by s. 58 if the owner could not put it to the only use for which it is usable without being liable for infringement.

Accordingly, the Court upheld the trial judge's decision that Ford could rely upon section 58 as a defence.

== Are apparatus claims necessary to rely on the prior user defence? ==
It is uncertain at present whether the prior user defence would apply to a patented process per se used prior to the material date.

Justice Hall, for the Court, states that "The patent in suit includes apparatus claims under which the respondent is entitled to the benefit of s. 58", which implies that the prior use defence can only apply if the patent has claimed an apparatus. However, Ford’s apparatus did not come within the scope of the apparatus claims, yet Ford received the benefit of section 58, which implies that apparatus claims are not necessary for Ford to rely on section 58. The Court later states that "On the view that there is but one invention in the patent, [Ford] is entitled to rely on the specification as a whole to show that its machine is an "invention" for which the patent in suit was obtained." Here, Justice Hall seems to conclude that as long as the patented invention covers Ford’s machine, the prior user defence is applicable. This interpretation is consistent with the view that apparatus claims are not necessary and that to rely on the prior user defence, Ford’s machine must merely be disclosed in the specification of the patent as an aspect of the claimed invention. Commentators have reached a similar conclusion.

== See also ==
- Defences and remedies in Canadian patent law
- List of Supreme Court of Canada cases (Richards Court through Fauteux Court)
