= Manitoba (AG) v Manitoba Egg and Poultry Association =

- Supreme Court of Canada

Hearing: May 31 - June 2, 1971 Judgment: June 28, 1971
- Full case name: The Attorney-General for Manitoba v. Manitoba Egg and Poultry Association, Manitoba Egg and Pullet Producers’ Association, Manitoba Feed Manufacturers Association, Manitoba Hatchery Association, Meat Packers Council of Canada, and Canadian Feed Manufacturers Association
- Citations: [1971] S.C.R. 689
- Prior history: Reference question answered in favour of the food producers in the Manitoba Court of Appeal.
- Ruling: Appeal dismissed.

Holding
- Laws which restrict one province from trading with another province is the exclusive jurisdiction of the federal government, and cannot be legislated by the province.

Court membership
- Chief Justice: Gérald Fauteux; Puisne Justices: Douglas Abbott, Ronald Martland, Wilfred Judson, Roland Ritchie, Emmett Hall, Wishart Spence, Louis-Philippe Pigeon, Bora Laskin

Reasons given
- Majority: Martland J., joined by Fauteux C.J. and Abbott, Judson, Ritchie, and Spence JJ..
- Concurrence: Laskin J., joined by Hall J.
- Concurrence: Pigeon J.

Manitoba (AG) v Manitoba Egg and Poultry Association (the Manitoba Egg Reference) [1971] S.C.R. 689 is a leading Supreme Court of Canada decision on the Trade and Commerce power under section 91(2) of the Constitution Act, 1867. The decision was the result of a growing political debate known as the "chicken and egg war" where Quebec and Ontario enacted protectionist legislation for the egg and poultry industry preventing Manitoba from selling their eggs and poultry products in those provinces. To much of the public's surprise the Court struck down a provincial statute regulating the marketing of eggs. The case somewhat contradicted the precedent case of Carnation Co. v. Quebec Agricultural Marketing Board, [1968] S.C.R. 238 which held that provincial law that has an incidental effect on other provinces is still valid.

The Court held that even though there was no direct evidence showing that there was extraprovincial effect of the provincial law, the potential effect was sufficient to find the law ultra vires. The Court found that control of imports was essential to the provincial legislative scheme even though the law made no distinction between eggs produced inside or outside of the province. The Court distinguished the case from the Carnation decision by the fact that the Manitoba regulations intended to provide regulation of inter-provincial trade while in Carnation the law only has the effect of regulating inter-provincial trade.

In the aftermath of the decision, all 11 governments, the 10 governments of the provinces and the federal government, entered an agreement with the federal government which arranged a federal egg marketing scheme which created quotas for each of the provinces, and charged tariffs for eggs sold outside of the province.

== See also ==
- Canadian Egg Marketing Agency v Richardson
- Reference Re Agricultural Products Marketing
- List of Supreme Court of Canada cases (Richards Court through Fauteux Court)
