= Tennessee Eastman Co v Canada (Commissioner of Patents) =

- Supreme Court of Canada

Hearing: May 2 and 3, 1972 Judgment: December 22, 1972
- Full case name: Tennessee Eastman Company, a division of Eastman Kodak Company: Eastman Kodak Company and Ethicon, Inc. Appellants; and The Commissioner of Patents Respondent.
- Citations: [1974] S.C.R. 111
- Prior history: none
- Ruling: Appeal Dismissed

Court membership
- Chief Justice: Gérald Fauteux; Puisne Justices: Douglas Abbott, Ronald Martland, Wilfred Judson, Roland Ritchie, Emmett Hall, Wishart Spence, Louis-Philippe Pigeon, Bora Laskin

Reasons given
- Unanimous reasons by: Pigeon J.
- Fauteux C.J., Abbott J., Judson J., and Spence J. took no part in the consideration or decision of the case.

Tennessee Eastman Co v Canada (Commissioner of Patents), [1974] S.C.R. 111, is a leading Supreme Court of Canada authority for the proposition that medical or therapeutic methods are not patentable in Canada.

== Background ==
Tennessee Eastman sought a patent for a surgical method for bonding a wound together by applying certain glues. (Note: Specifically, the patent application claimed, in part: "The method for surgical bonding of body tissues which comprises applying to at least one of the tissue surfaces to be bonded an adhesive composition comprising a monomeric ester of a-cyanoacrylic acid ... ") The glues themselves were not new. The new discovery was that the glues could be used in place of stitches to close wounds.

The Commissioner of Patents refused to grant the patent on the ground that the claimed method was not the kind of discovery which fell within the definition of “invention” in the Patent Act. In particular, it was not an “art” because it was useful only in the process of surgical treatment and produced no result in relation to trade, commerce or industry.

Tennessee Eastman appealed to the Exchequer Court. The issue there was whether this use of glue fell within the meaning of new and useful “art” or “process” within the meaning of the Patent Act. The Exchequer Court held that it did not for the reasons given by the Commissioner of Patents.

== Reasons of the Court ==
The Supreme Court concluded that methods of medical treatment are not contemplated in the definition of invention as a kind of "process". Section 41 of the Patent Act restricted the scope of patents “relating to substances prepared or produced by chemical processes and intended for food or medicine.” This implied that, with respect to such substances, a medical or therapeutic use cannot be claimed by a process claim apart from the substance itself.

== Post-Tennessee Eastman ==
The decision was based on the former s. 41 of the Patent Act, R.S.C. 1970, c. P-4, now repealed. Even so, the overall conclusion made in Tennessee Eastman (that methods of medical treatment are not patentable) has been upheld by the Federal Court of Appeal and cited with approval by the Supreme Court of Canada.

The current rationale for rejecting claims for methods of medical treatment is that enunciated by the Commission of Patents in this decision. A method that is essentially non-economic and unrelated to trade, industry, or commerce, and instead relates to an area of professional skills, is unpatentable.

== Circumventing the prohibition ==
Although Canadian jurisprudence has held that methods of medical treatment are unpatentable, many such claims can often be redrafted as “use” or “composition” claims, which have been found acceptable. For example, in Canada, an inventor may get a patent on a product (i.e. a pharmaceutical), a patent on the method of use of the pharmaceutical (i.e. a patient taking the pill), and a patent on the diagnostic kit for use of the product. In particular, an invention directed towards the treatment of disease is patentable, since there is no removal of the need for professional skill and judgment, and the invention deals with an economic area related to trade, commerce or industry.

== See also ==
- Subject matter in Canadian patent law
- List of Supreme Court of Canada cases (Richards Court through Fauteux Court)
