= Walter v Alberta (AG) =

Famous decision of the Supreme Court of Canada

- Supreme Court of Canada

Hearing: October 31 - November 1, 1968 Judgment: January 1969
- Full case name: Walter et al. v Attorney General of Alberta et al.
- Citations: 1969 CanLII 64 (SCC), [1969] SCR 383

Court membership
- Chief Justice: John Robert Cartwright; Puisne Justices: Gérald Fauteux, Douglas Abbott, Ronald Martland, Wilfred Judson, Roland Ritchie, Emmett Hall, Wishart Spence, Louis-Philippe Pigeon

Reasons given
- Unanimous reasons by: Martland J.

Walter v Alberta (AG), [1969] S.C.R. 383 is a famous decision of the Supreme Court of Canada. The Court upheld the Albertan provincial Communal Properties Act of 1955, which among other things, restricted the amount of land that could be owned by Hutterites and Doukhobors. The Act required that those wishing to use land for communal colonies must first obtain the permission of the provincial government. It was intended to restrict communal use of land, but had the effect of discriminating against religious groups.

Paul Walter, not a Hutterite, wished to sell his land to a group of Hutterites and was prevented from doing so by the Communal Properties Act. The plaintiffs argued that the Act was "colourable" legislation (i.e. law that had a hidden purpose), and that its true purpose concerned freedom of religion, which is a matter within the exclusive jurisdiction of the federal government.

The Court unanimously upheld the Act. The pith and substance of the Act, the Court said, related to land ownership in Alberta. Accordingly, property within the province was a valid matter of provincial jurisdiction, even though it had an incidental effect on religion.

== See also ==
- List of Supreme Court of Canada cases (Richards Court through Fauteux Court)
