= Carnation Co v Quebec (Agricultural Marketing Board) =

Constitutional decision of the Supreme Court of Canada

- Supreme Court of Canada

Hearing: June 12–13, 1967 Judgment: January 23, 1968
- Full case name: Carnation Company Limited v. Quebec Agricultural Marketing Board et al.
- Citations: [1968] SCR 238
- Docket No.: 10548
- Prior history: On appeal from Quebec
- Ruling: Appeal dismissed.

Court membership
- Chief Justice: John Robert Cartwright; Puisne Justices: Gérald Fauteux, Douglas Abbott, Ronald Martland, Wilfred Judson, Roland Ritchie, Emmett Hall, Wishart Spence, Louis-Philippe Pigeon

Reasons given
- Unanimous reasons by: Martland J.
- Cartwright CJ. and Pigeon J. took no part in the consideration or decision of the case.

Carnation Co v Quebec (Agricultural Marketing Board) [1968] S.C.R. 238 is a leading constitutional decision of the Supreme Court of Canada on the federal authority over trade and commerce under section 91(2) of the Constitution Act, 1867. The Court held that incidental overlap of provincial laws into federal trade and commerce matters does not necessarily invalidate the law.

The issue was whether the Quebec Agricultural Marketing Board, a board created by the province, was ultra vires the authority of the province. The Court held that incidental overlap is allowed where the pith and substance of a law in intra vires the province. The Court found that the pith and substance of the Board was related to contractual rights which is valid provincial subject matter.

== See also ==
- List of Supreme Court of Canada cases (Richards Court through Fauteux Court)
