= Section 91(2) of the Constitution Act, 1867 =

Section 91(2) of the Constitution Act, 1867, also known as the trade and commerce power, grants the Parliament of Canada the authority to legislate on:

2. The Regulation of Trade and Commerce.

The development of Canadian constitutional law has given this power characteristics that are unique from those that are specified in the United States Constitution's Commerce Clause and the Australian Constitution's interstate trade and commerce power.

== Initial jurisprudence ==
First examined in Citizen's Insurance Co. v. Parsons (1881), Sir Montague Smith of the Judicial Committee of the Privy Council determined its scope thus:

The words "regulation of trade and commerce," in their unlimited sense are sufficiently wide, if uncontrolled by the context and other parts of the Act, to include every regulation of trade ranging from political arrangements in regard to trade with foreign governments, requiring the sanction of parliament, down to minute rules for regulating particular trades. But a consideration of the Act shews [sic] that the words were not used in this unlimited sense. In the first place the collocation of No. 2 with classes of subjects of national and general concern affords an indication that regulations relating to general trade and commerce were in the mind of the legislature, when conferring this power on the dominion parliament. If the words had been intended to have the full scope of which in their literal meaning they are susceptible, the specific mention of several of the other classes of subjects enumerated in sect. 91 would have been unnecessary; as, 15, banking; 17, weights and measures; 18, bills of exchange and promissory notes; 19, interest; and even 21, bankruptcy and insolvency.

...

Construing therefore the words "regulation of trade and commerce" by the various aids to their interpretation above suggested, they would include political arrangements in regard to trade requiring the sanction of parliament, regulation of trade in matters of inter-provincial concern, and it may be that they would include general regulation of trade affecting the whole dominion. Their Lordships abstain on the present occasion from any attempt to define the limits of the authority of the dominion parliament in this direction. It is enough for the decision of the present case to say that, in their view, its authority to legislate for the regulation of trade and commerce does not comprehend the power to regulate by legislation the contracts of a particular business or trade, such as the business of fire insurance in a single province, and therefore that its legislative authority does not in the present case conflict or compete with the power over property and civil rights assigned to the legislature of Ontario by No. 13 of sect. 92.

...

Having taken this view of the present case, it becomes unnecessary to consider the question how far the general power to make regulations of trade and commerce, when competently exercised by the dominion parliament, might legally modify or affect property and civil rights in the provinces, or the legislative power of the provincial legislatures in relation to those subjects ...

Therefore, Parsons establishes three basic propositions about the trade and commerce power that have underlined all subsequent jurisprudence:

- it does not correspond to the literal meaning of the words "regulation of trade and commerce";
- it includes not only arrangements with regard to international and interprovincial trade but "it may be that .. . [it] would include general regulation of trade affecting the whole dominion";
- it does not extend to regulating the contracts of a particular business or trade.

Initially the scope for extraprovincial trade was set very narrowly by the Privy Council. In the Board of Commerce case, the Privy Council suggested that the trade and commerce power applied only as an ancillary power to some other valid federal power. This principle was eventually rejected in Toronto Electric Commissioners v. Snider and Proprietary Articles Trade Association v. Attorney General of Canada, but the power was still read strictly.

In R. v. Eastern Terminal Elevator Co. (1925), a federal law regulating trade of provincially produced grain destined entirely for export was found not to be within the meaning of extraprovincial trade. As Duff J. (as he then was) noted in his opinion:

...the Dominion possesses legislative powers… to regulate this branch of external trade for the purpose of protecting it, by ensuring correctness in grading and freedom from adulteration, as well as providing for effective and reliable public guarantees as to quality. It does not follow that it is within the power of Parliament to accomplish this object by assuming, as this legislation does, the regulation in the provinces of particular occupations, as such, by a licensing system and otherwise, and of local works and undertakings, as such, however important and beneficial the ultimate purpose of the legislation may be.

...

There are two lurking fallacies in the argument advanced on behalf of the Crown; first, that, because in large part the grain trade is an export trade, you can regulate it locally in order to give effect to your policy in relation to the regulation of that part of it which is export. Obviously that is not a principle the application of which can be ruled by percentages. If it is operative when the export trade is seventy per cent of the whole, it must be equally operative when that percentage is only thirty; and such a principle in truth must postulate authority in the Dominion to assume the regulation of almost any trade in the country, provided it does so by setting up a scheme embracing the local, as well as the external and interprovincial trade; and regulation of trade, according to the conception of it which governs this legislation, includes the regulation in the provinces of the occupations of those engaged in the trade, and of the local establishments in which it is carried on. Precisely the same thing was attempted in the Insurance Act of 1910, unsuccessfully. The other fallacy is (the two are, perhaps, different forms of the same error) that the Dominion has such power because no single province, nor, indeed, all the provinces acting together, could put into effect such a sweeping scheme.

By the 1930s, as noted succinctly in the Fish Canneries Reference and then subsequently in the Aeronautics Reference, the division of responsibilities between federal and provincial jurisdictions was summarized as follows by Lord Sankey:

1. The legislation of the Parliament of the Dominion, so long as it strictly relates to subjects of legislation expressly enumerated in section 91, is of paramount authority, even if it trenches upon matters assigned to the Provincial Legislature by section 92.
2. The general power of legislation conferred up on the Parliament of the Dominion by section 91 of the Act in supplement of the power to legislate upon the subjects expressly enumerated must be strictly confined to such matters as are unquestionably of national interest and importance, and must not trench on any of the subjects enumerated in section 92, as within the scope of Provincial legislation, unless these matters have attained such dimensions as to affect the body politic of the Dominion.
3. It is within the competence of the Dominion Parliament to provide for matters which though otherwise within the legislative competence of the Provincial Legislature, are necessarily incidental to effective legislation by the Parliament of the Dominion upon a subject of legislation expressly enumerated in section 91.
4. There can be a domain in which Provincial and Dominion legislation may overlap, in which case, neither legislation will be ultra vires if the field is clear, but if the field is not clear and the two legislations meet, the Dominion legislation must prevail.

Murphy v. C.P.R. (1958): Murphy overturns Eastern Terminal Elevators. Change from '25 -’58 is that the Gov of Canada has declared all grain elevators to be working for the "general advantage of Canada." Every Mill and recipient was numbered under S.92 (c) and was taken control of by the Wheat board.

== Modern interpretation by the Supreme Court of Canada ==
With the abolition of appeals to the Privy Council, the interpretation of the power became broader. In Caloil Inc. v. Canada (1971) the Court upheld a law prohibiting the movement of imported oil as a form of regulating inter-provincial trade. As noted in the majority judgment by Pigeon J.:

It is clear, therefore, that the existence and extent of provincial regulatory authority over specific trades within the province is not the sole criterion to be considered in deciding whether a federal regulation affecting such a trade is invalid. On the contrary, it is no objection when the impugned enactment is an integral part of a scheme for the regulation of international or interprovincial trade, a purpose that is clearly outside provincial jurisdiction and within the exclusive federal field of action.

=== Provincial jurisdiction over extraprovincial trade and commerce ===
The Court has also considered the effect of provincial law on the trade and commerce power. In Carnation Co. v. Quebec Agricultural Marketing Board, Martland J. held that provincial regulations that had an incidental effect on extraprovincial trade were valid:

The view of the four judges in the Ontario Reference was that the fact that a transaction took place wholly within a province did not necessarily mean that it was thereby subject solely to provincial control. The regulation of some such transactions relating to products destined for interprovincial trade could constitute a regulation of interprovincial trade and be beyond provincial control.

While I agree with the view of the four judges in the Ontario Reference that a trade transaction, completed in a province, is not necessarily, by that fact alone, subject only to provincial control, I also hold the view that the fact that such a transaction incidentally has some effect upon a company engaged in interprovincial trade does not necessarily prevent its being subject to such control.

I agree with the view of Abbott J., in the Ontario Reference, that each transaction and each regulation must be examined in relation to its own facts. In the present case, the orders under question were not, in my opinion, directed at the regulation of interprovincial trade. They did not purport directly to control or to restrict such trade. There was no evidence that, in fact, they did control or restrict it. The most that can be said of them is that they had some effect upon the cost of doing business in Quebec of a company engaged in interprovincial trade, and that, by itself, is not sufficient to make them invalid.

However, as held in Attorney-General for Manitoba v. Manitoba Egg and Poultry Association et al., if the provincial scheme limits the free flow of trade between provinces than it will be struck down. As noted by Laskin J. (as he then was) in the latter case:

There may be a variety of reasons which impel a province to enact regulatory legislation for the marketing of various products. For example, it may wish to secure the health of the inhabitants by establishing quality standards; it may wish to protect consumers against exorbitant prices; it may wish to equalize the bargaining or competitive position of producers or distributors or retailers, or all three classes; it may wish to ensure an adequate supply of certain products. These objects may not all nor always be realizable through legislation which fastens on the regulated product as being within the province. That is no longer, if it ever was, the test of validity. Just as the province may not, as a general rule, prohibit an owner of goods from sending them outside the province, so it may not be able to subject goods to a regulatory scheme upon their entry into the province. This is not to say that goods that have come into a province may not, thereafter, be subject to the same controls in, for example, retail distribution to consumers as apply to similar goods produced in the province.

Assuming such controls to be open to a province, the scheme before this court is not so limited. It embraces products which are in the current of interprovincial trade and, as noted at the beginning of these reasons, it embraces them in whatever degree they seek to enter the provincial market. It begs the question to say that out-of-province producers who come in voluntarily (certainly they cannot be compelled by Manitoba) must not expect to be treated differently from local producers. I do not reach the question of discriminatory standards applied to out-of-province producers or distributors (that is, the question of a possibly illegal administration of the scheme as bearing on its validity) because I am of opinion that the scheme is on its face an invasion of federal power in relation to s. 91 (2).

There are several grounds upon which I base this conclusion. The proposed scheme has as a direct object the regulation of the importation of eggs, and it is not saved by the fact that the local market is under the same regime. Anglin J. said in Gold Seal Ltd. v. Dominion Express Co. that “it is common ground that the prohibition of importation is beyond the legislative jurisdiction of the province”. Conversely, the general limitation upon provincial authority to exercise of its powers within or in the province precludes it from intercepting either goods moving into the province or goods moving out, subject to possible exceptions, as in the case of danger to life or health. Again, the Manitoba scheme cannot be considered in isolation from similar schemes in other provinces; and to permit each province to seek its own advantage, so to speak, through a figurative sealing of its borders to entry of goods from others would be to deny one of the objects of Confederation, evidenced by the catalogue of federal powers and by s. 121, namely, to form an economic unit of the whole of Canada: see the Lawson case. The existence of egg marketing schemes in more than one province, with objectives similar to the proposed Manitoba scheme, makes it clear that interprovincial trade in eggs is being struck at by the provincial barriers to their movement into various provincial markets. If it be thought necessary or desirable to arrest such movement at any provincial border then the aid of the Parliament of Canada must be sought, as was done through Part V of the Canada Temperance Act, in respect of provincial regulation of the sale of intoxicating liquor.

A significant decision with impact on Canadian federalism was made in the Reference re Agricultural Products Marketing Act (1978) where the Supreme Court upheld a federal egg marketing scheme that imposed quotas of different provinces. This was a particularly broad interpretation of extraprovincial trade as it included even egg producers who did not export their products. In endorsing the federal-provincial scheme that had been established, Pigeon J. stated:

We are not called upon to decide in the present case whether the federal Parliament could assume control over egg farms devoted exclusively to the production of eggs for extraprovincial trade. Under the present circumstances such farms are, like any other farms, local undertakings subject to provincial authority, irrespective of the destination of their output. I can see no reason why such legislative authority would not extend to the control of production as to quantity just as it extends undoubtedly to the price to be paid for raw materials.

This does not mean that such power is unlimited, a province cannot control extraprovincial trade, as was held in the Manitoba Egg Reference and in the Burns Foods case. However, “Marketing” does not include production and, therefore, provincial control of production is prima facie valid. In the instant case, the provincial regulation is not aimed at controlling the extraprovincial trade. In so far as it affects this trade, it is only complementary to the regulations established under federal authority. In my view this is perfectly legitimate, otherwise it would mean that our Constitution makes it impossible by federal-provincial cooperative action to arrive at any practical scheme for the orderly and efficient production and marketing of a commodity which all governments concerned agree requires regulation in both intraprovincial and extraprovincial trade. As early as 1912, it was asserted by the Privy Council that “whatever belongs to self-government in Canada belongs either to the Dominion or to the provinces”. I do not overlook the admonition in the Natural Products Marketing Act case, that the legislation has to be carefully framed but, when after 40 years a sincere cooperative effort has been accomplished, it would really be unfortunate if this was all brought to nought. While I adhere to the view that provinces may not make use of their control over local undertakings to affect extraprovincial marketing, this does not, in my view, prevent the use of provincial control to complement federal regulation of extraprovincial trade.

In so far as the producer quotas are to be viewed as marketing quotas rather than as production quotas, it seems to me that their validity is established by the principle of the Willis case. Those quotas are fixed by the provincial board so the total will equal what the plan, established under the federal Act, provides for Ontario in respect of extraprovincial trade in addition to what comes under intraprovincial trade. The Board is properly empowered by provincial authority to regulate the intraprovincial trade and it has delegated authority from the federal in respect of the extraprovincial trade. I fail to see what objection there can be to overall quotas established by a board thus vested with dual authority, unless it is said that our constitution precludes any businesslike marketing of products in both local and extraprovincial trade except under a federal assumption of power, something which I think, is directly contrary to the basic principle of the B.N.A. Act.

There has been discussion as to whether Canadian jurisprudence ought to adopt an approach similar to the dormant commerce clause doctrine in the United States, in order to better address conflicts between the federal and provincial jurisdictions.

=== Modern developments on the general regulation of trade and commerce ===
In General Motors of Canada Ltd. v. City National Leasing, Dickson C.J. listed five indicia of competence for the Parliament of Canada to legislate:

- the impugned legislation must be part of a regulatory scheme;
- the scheme must be monitored by the continuing oversight of a regulatory agency;
- the legislation must be concerned with trade as a whole rather than with a particular industry;
- the legislation should be of a nature that provinces jointly or severally would be constitutionally incapable of enacting; and
- the failure to include one or more provinces or localities in a legislative scheme would jeopardize the successful operation of the scheme in other parts of the country.

The regulation of general trade must be broad and sweeping, and cannot single out a particular trade or industry. In Labatt Breweries v. Canada, Estey J. held that the regulation of the composition of "light beer" under the Food and Drugs Act was invalid as it was too narrow to be directed towards trade.

Such post-General Motors analysis is still considered to be vague and problematical in many respects, as it does not lend itself easily to either categorical or balancing styles of analysis.

How a matter becomes one of national concern is governed by the principles stated by Le Dain J. in R. v. Crown Zellerbach Canada Ltd.:

The national concern doctrine is separate and distinct from the national emergency doctrine of the peace, order and good government power, which is chiefly distinguishable by the fact that it provides a constitutional basis for what is necessarily legislation of a temporary nature;

The national concern doctrine applies to both new matters which did not exist at Confederation and to matters which, although originally matters of a local or private nature in a province, have since, in the absence of national emergency, become matters of national concern;

For a matter to qualify as a matter of national concern in either sense it must have a singleness, distinctiveness and indivisibility that clearly distinguishes it from matters of provincial concern and a scale of impact on provincial jurisdiction that is reconcilable with the fundamental distribution of legislative power under the Constitution;

In determining whether a matter has attained the required degree of singleness, distinctiveness and indivisibility that clearly distinguishes it from matters of provincial concern it is relevant to consider what would be the effect on extra‑provincial interests of a provincial failure to deal effectively with the control or regulation of the intra‑provincial aspects of the matter.

The general trade branch was also considered in 2011 in Reference re Securities Act, where the Court was asked to give its opinion on the Federal Government's proposal to federalize the regulation of the securities industry in Canada. In dismissing the attempt as being unconstitutional as currently drafted, the Court noted:

[122]... Canada’s problem is that the proposed Act reflects an attempt that goes well beyond these matters of undoubted national interest and concern and reaches down into the detailed regulation of all aspects of securities. In this respect, the proposed Act is unlike federal competition legislation, which has been held to fall under s. 91(2) of the Constitution Act, 1867. It would regulate all aspects of contracts for securities within the provinces, including all aspects of public protection and professional competence within the provinces. Competition law, by contrast, regulates only anti-competitive contracts and conduct — a particular aspect of economic activity that falls squarely within the federal domain. In short, the proposed federal Act overreaches the legislative interest of the federal government.
