= Highway Properties Ltd v Kelly, Douglas and Co Ltd =

- Supreme Court of Canada

Hearing: June 22, 1970 Judgment: February 1, 1971
- Full case name: Highway Properties Limited v Kelly, Douglas and Company Limited
- Citations: [1971] SCR 562, [1972] 2 WWR 28, 1971 CanLII 123
- Prior history: Appeal from the Court of Appeal for British Columbia
- Ruling: Appeal Allowed

Court membership
- Chief Justice: Gérald Fauteux; Puisne Justices: Douglas Abbott, Ronald Martland, Wilfred Judson, Roland Ritchie, Emmett Hall, Wishart Spence, Louis-Philippe Pigeon, Bora Laskin

Reasons given
- Unanimous reasons by: Laskin J.
- Fauteux C.J.C., Abbott, Hall, Pigeon JJ. took no part in the consideration or decision of the case.

Highway Properties Ltd v Kelly, Douglas and Co Ltd is a leading Canadian property law case concerning commercial landlord-tenant relationships decided by the Supreme Court of Canada.

The decision imported the contract law concept of repudiation and recovery for prospective damages into property law. This gave landlords the right to sue a tenant for breach of a lease agreement (usually by abandonment) and recover the present value of unpaid future rent as well as losses resulting from lost business due to the tenant's breach of the lease agreement.

== Background ==
The landlord, Highway Properties Ltd., leased a retail location in its shopping centre to the tenant, Kelly Douglas and Co. Ltd., "to be used for grocery store and super market". The lease was agreed to on August 19, 1960, and was to take effect for a term of fifteen years from October 1, 1960.

The landlord's shopping centre consisted of 11 retail spaces and the supermarket was to be the anchor tenant of the venture. Clause 9 of the lease agreement provided that the tenant carry on "its business on the said premises continuously."

The premises in question was operated as a grocery store by a subtenant beginning October 20, 1960. However, the shopping centre was not successful and was never fully leased. By March 24, 1962, the subtenant gave notice that it intended to close down its business. It did so and began to remove its goods.

On July 16, 1962, the landlord filed suit against the tenant. The tenant continued to pay rent while unsuccessfully searching for another subtenant. By November 22, 1963, the premises had been abandoned, and most of the other tenants in the shopping centre had also moved out. On that date the landlord took possession of the premises and attempted to find a new tenant.

At trial the landlord claimed damages suffered for rescission but more importantly, also for prospective loss resulting from the respondent's failure to carry on a supermarket business in the shopping centre for the full term of the lease.

At issue in the Supreme Court was the prospective loss from breach of the lease agreement.

== Opinion of the Court ==
Laskin J., writing for a unanimous Court, surveyed the existing state of landlord-tenant law, and summarized the three existing mutually exclusive remedies available to landlords for repudiation of a lease. The three traditional remedies under the common law were:

1. Upon refusal to accept repudiation, the landlord could insist on performance of the lease and sue the tenant for rent owed each time it came due;
2. Upon acceptance of the repudiation and termination of the lease, the landlord could re-possess the premises and sue the tenant for rent owed or losses resulting from the tenant's breach of covenants to the date of termination; or
3. Advise the tenant that he proposes to re-let the property on behalf of the tenant and enter possession on that basis (thereby continuing the landlord-tenant relationship), and sue for shortfall in rent where it occurs.

Laskin accepted the landlord's argument for a fourth remedy:

[T]he landlord may elect to terminate the lease but with notice to the defaulting tenant that damages will be claimed on the footing of a present recovery of damages for losing the benefit of the lease over its unexpired term. One element of such damages would be, of course, the present value of the unpaid future rent for the unexpired period of the lease less the actual rental value of the premises for that period. Another element would be the loss, so far as provable, resulting from the repudiation of clause 9.

In doing so, Laskin noted that the traditional property law remedies did not properly account for the realities of modern commercial tenancies, which were highly contractual in nature:

There are some general considerations that support the view that I would take. It is no longer sensible to pretend that a commercial lease, such as the one before this Court, is simply a conveyance and not also a contract. It is equally untenable to persist in denying resort to the full armoury of remedies ordinarily available to redress repudiation of covenants, merely because the covenants may be associated with an estate in land. Finally, there is merit here as in other situations in avoiding multiplicity of actions that may otherwise be a concomitant of insistence that a landlord engage in instalment litigation against a repudiating tenant.

The appeal was allowed on this fourth basis of damages and the case was remitted to the trial court for an assessment of the amount owed by the tenant.

== Aftermath ==
The Highway Properties judgment essentially imported the contractual remedy for recovery of future losses as a result of repudiation, but left open the question of whether notice was required (and if so, when it must be given) and whether there is a duty for the landlord to mitigate losses as is the case in contract law.

=== Notice requirement ===
Subsequent cases have been unclear as to whether reasonable notice prior to repudiation is required in all circumstances to claim recovery of prospective damages.

In Veysoglu v O'Keefe and Goudie, the court held that notice was not necessary because the lease agreement specifically provided that the balance of rent owed for the full term of the lease became due upon repudiation of the lease by the tenant. The court found that the explicit recognition of the right of action negated the need for notice as the tenant was already aware of this possibility when he signed the lease.

On the other hand, the court in Langley Crossing Shopping Centre v North-West Produce, held that separate notice was still necessary at the time of termination.

Another related issue left open was whether notice must be contemporaneous with the termination of the lease. Courts have generally held that the notice be given within a "reasonable time" but not necessarily simultaneous with termination of the lease. For example, in North Bay T.V. and Audio Ltd. v Nova Electronics Ltd. Et Al., a statement of claim about six weeks after the tenant terminated the lease was held to be within "reasonable time".

=== Mitigation of losses ===
Prior to the decision in Highway Properties, landlords were not under a duty to mitigate their losses following a tenant's abandonment. Using the three traditional remedies available in leasehold law, they were able to keep the lease alive and hold the tenant responsible for rent in arrears. However, the importation of contractual principles made this less clear. Landlords were still able to sue under the three traditional remedies, but also had access to a fourth for prospective damages. The Supreme Court of Canada has not addressed the issue of mitigation following Highway Properties, and provincial appellate courts have been inconsistent.

It is clear, however, that where the landlord has in fact mitigated their losses (for example by renting out the premises to another tenant following the first tenant's abandonment), courts have taken this into account in the calculation of damages. Where the subsequent tenant pays more than the abandoning tenant would have paid, the abandoning tenant has not been held responsible as there was no loss suffered by the landlord. See, for example, Toronto Housing Co. v Postal Promotions Ltd.
