= Murdoch v Murdoch =

- Supreme Court of Canada

Hearing: 22, 23 March 1973 Judgment: 2 October 1973
- Full case name: Irene Florence Murdoch v James Alexander Murdoch
- Citations: [1975] 1 S.C.R. 423
- Ruling: Application for division of matrimonial property under trust law dismissed.

Holding
- No intention to create a trust in favour of the wife, who did not contribute to the finances in a way other than what was common for a ranch wife.

Court membership
- Chief Justice: Gérald Fauteux; Puisne Justices: Douglas Abbott, Ronald Martland, Wilfred Judson, Roland Ritchie, Emmett Hall, Wishart Spence, Louis-Philippe Pigeon, Bora Laskin

Reasons given
- Majority: Ronald Martland, joined by Wilfred Judson, Roland Ritchie, Wishart Spence
- Dissent: Bora Laskin
- Chief Justice Fauteux and Justices Abbott, Hall, and Pigeon took no part in the consideration or decision of the case.

Murdoch v Murdoch, also known as the Murdoch Case, was a controversial family law decision by the Supreme Court of Canada where the Court denied an abused ranch wife any interest in the family ranch. This case is most notable for the public outcry it created at the time and for what many believe is Justice Laskin's most famous dissenting opinion.

Irene Murdoch, the wife of an Albertan rancher, submitted a claim for half the interest in the family ranch that was registered under the husband's name. The question put before the Court was whether there was an implied trust on behalf of the wife for all her years of labour on the ranch.

In a 4-1 decision, a majority of the Court dismissed the wife's application. Speaking for the majority, Justice Martland upheld the trial judge's finding that the wife's labour was not beyond what was normally expected of a ranch wife. Martland J. held that since there was no financial contribution nor intention to create a trust, there could be no resulting trust, relying on a similar English case, Gissing v. Gissing.

In dissent, Laskin J. argued that the Court did not need to examine intent in order to find a trust; rather a constructive trust based in equity could be found.

Laskin's dissent proved to be among his most famous. Many scholars, himself included, believed that his dissent was a major factor in his unexpected promotion to Chief Justice in December 1973.

Canadian feminists publicized the case across the country. The outcry against the decision contributed to substantial reforms to matrimonial property laws across the country, giving husbands and wives equal rights to property acquired during the course of the marriage.

Following the Supreme Court decision, Irene Murdoch started a new proceeding, a petition for divorce. In the divorce proceedings, she was found to be entitled to a lump-sum award of $65,000 from James Murdoch, in place of monthly spousal maintenance.
