= R v Whitfield =

Supreme Court of Canada case

- Supreme Court of Canada

Hearing: June 18, 19, 1969 Judgment: October 7, 1969
- Full case name: Her Majesty the Queen v James Whitfield
- Citations: 1969 CanLII 4 (SCC), [1970] SCR 46

Court membership
- Chief Justice: John Robert Cartwright; Puisne Justices: Gérald Fauteux, Douglas Abbott, Ronald Martland, Wilfred Judson, Roland Ritchie, Emmett Hall, Wishart Spence, Louis-Philippe Pigeon

Reasons given
- Majority: Judson, joined by Fauteux, Martland, Ritchie and Pigeon JJ.
- Dissent: Hall J., joined by Spence J.

R v Whitfield (1969), [1970] S.C.R. 46 is a leading Supreme Court of Canada decision on the legal requirements of an arrest under the Criminal Code.

== Background ==
In June 1967, James Whitfield was driving down a street in eastern Toronto. He had been wanted for damaging the seat cushions of a local restaurant. The police spotted him in his car and approached him at a stop light. Officer Kerr told him that he had a warrant for his arrest. Whitfield drove off but had to stop due to oncoming traffic. Kerr ran up to the car and grabbed Whitfield by the collar and said he was under arrest, but Whitfield accelerated and Kerr fell to the road.

Whitfield was convicted of escape of lawful arrest.

== Reasons of the court ==
Judson J., writing for the majority, adopted the common law definition of arrest as consisting of "the actual seizure or touching of a person's body with a view to his detention. The mere pronouncing of words of arrest is not an arrest, unless the person sought to be arrested submits to the process and goes with the arresting officer." Consequently, there are two requirements to affect an arrest: actual seizure or touching of the suspects body with a view to detention; and pronouncing "words of arrest" to the suspect.

On the facts, the Court held that Whitfield was put under arrest and so the charge of escaping arrest was upheld.

In the subsequent Supreme Court case of R v Latimer, the court held that arrest may also be effected by words and a restraint on liberty accompanied by submission.
