= Quebec (AG) v Kellogg's Co of Canada =

- Supreme Court of Canada

Hearing: March 15 and 16, 1977 Judgment: January 19, 1978
- Full case name: Attorney-General of the Province of Quebec v. Kellogg’s Company of Canada and Kellogg’s of Canada Limited
- Citations: [1978] 2 SCR 211
- Prior history: Judgment for Kellogg Company in the Court of Appeal for Quebec
- Ruling: Appeal allowed

Holding
- The province has the power to regulate a business's activities, even if those activities involve the use a federally regulated medium, such as television.

Court membership
- Chief Justice: Bora Laskin; Puisne Justices: Ronald Martland, Wilfred Judson, Roland Ritchie, Wishart Spence, Louis-Philippe Pigeon, Brian Dickson, Jean Beetz, Louis-Philippe de Grandpré

Reasons given
- Majority: Martland J., joined by Ritchie, Pigeon, Dickson, Beetz and de Grandpré JJ.
- Dissent: Laskin C.J., joined by Judson and Spence JJ.

Quebec (AG) v Kellogg's Co of Canada is a leading constitutional decision of the Supreme Court of Canada on the pre-Charter right to freedom of expression. The Quebec Consumer Protection Act, which prohibited advertising to children through cartoons, was challenged by the Kellogg Company on the basis that it affected TV stations across the country. The Court held that the regulation of advertising is a matter within the authority of the province, and that the Act was valid law under the Property and Civil Rights power allocated to the province under section 92(13) of the Constitution Act, 1867.

== Reasons of the court ==
Justice Martland found that the pith and substance of the legislation was the regulation of advertising which he identified as a matter allocated to the provincial government under the property and civil rights power. He noted that the regulation of advertising and was also part of a larger provincial scheme of regulating business practices, all of which fell within the purview of the provincial government. The encroachment upon the regulation of broadcasting was found to only be incidental to the primary subject of advertising, and so was valid.

Chief Justice Laskin, in dissent, disagreed with Martland and argued that the regulation must be read down to exclude the regulation of expression. He pointed out how in McKay v. The Queen (1965) the provincial law regulating signs was read down to exclude the regulation of federal voting signs. Likewise, in Johannesson v. West St. Paul (1952) a provincial law that regulated the zoning of aerodromes was not valid as it encroached on federal power to regulate air transportation.

== See also ==
- Irwin Toy Ltd. v. Quebec (Attorney General)
- List of Supreme Court of Canada cases (Laskin Court)
- Kellogg Co. v. National Biscuit Co.
