= O'Grady v Sparling =

- Supreme Court of Canada

Hearing: May 16–17, 1960 Judgment: October 4, 1960
- Citations: [1960] SCR 804, 1960 CanLII 70 (SCC)
- Prior history: APPEAL from a judgment of the Court of Appeal for Manitoba, 30 WWR 156, dismissing an appeal from the judgment of Williams CJKB
- Ruling: Appeal dismissed, Locke and Cartwright JJ dissenting

Holding
- A provincial enactment does not become a matter of criminal law merely because it consists of a prohibition and makes it an offence for failure to observe the prohibition. S. 55(1) of The Highway Traffic Act has for its true object, purpose, nature or character the regulation of traffic on highways and is valid provincial legislation.

Court membership
- Chief Justice: Patrick Kerwin; Puisne Justices: Robert Taschereau, Charles Holland Locke, John Robert Cartwright, Gerald Fauteux, Douglas Abbott, Ronald Martland, Wilfred Judson, Roland Ritchie

Reasons given
- Majority: Judson J, joined by Kerwin CJ, Taschereau, Fauteux, Abbott, and Martland JJ
- Concurrence: Ritchie J
- Dissent: Cartwright J, joined by Locke J

O'Grady v Sparling was a landmark Supreme Court of Canada decision, on the constitutionality of overlapping federal and provincial laws. The Court held that there was no conflict between federal dangerous driving offences, which only prohibited "advertent" negligence and provincial careless driving offences, including "inadvertent" negligence. The analysis used here is also known as the paramountcy doctrine.

== Background ==
The defendant was charged under section 55(1) of Manitoba's Highway Traffic Act, which prohibited driving "on a highway without due care and attention or without reasonable consideration for other persons using the highway". The defendant challenged the law, claiming that it was beyond the power of the province because the federal government had "occupied the field" with a similar criminal provision in the Criminal Code, which prohibited driving with "wanton or reckless disregard for the lives or safety of other persons."

The issue before the Court was whether provincial laws relating to negligence with penal consequences would necessarily be a criminal law and thus encroach on federal jurisdiction.

== Decision of the Court ==
=== Majority reasons ===
The majority reasons were given by Justice Judson, with Justices Kerwin, Taschereau, Fauteux, Abbott, Martland, and Ritchie concurring.

Judson held that "the power of a provincial legislature to enact legislation for the regulation of highway traffic is undoubted". He reaffirmed the principle that there exists a "general area" or "domain" of criminal law. Thus the two governments can make law on the same matter by creating a distinction between the types of culpability:

There is a fundamental difference between the subject-matter of these two pieces of legislation which the appellant's argument does not recognize. It is a difference in kind and not merely one of degree. This difference has been recognized and emphasized in the recent writings of Glanville Williams on Criminal Law, and by J.W.C. Turner. I adopt as part of my reasons Turner's statement of the difference to be found at p. 34 of Kenny:

But it should now be recognized that at common law there is no criminal liability for harm thus caused by inadvertence. This has been laid down authoritatively for manslaughter again and again. There are only two states of mind which constitute mens rea, and they are intention and recklessness. The difference between recklessness and negligence is the difference between advertence and inadvertence; they are opposed and it is a logical fallacy to suggest that recklessness is a degree of negligence. The common habit of lawyers to qualify the word "negligence" with some moral epithet such as "wicked", "gross", or "culpable" has been most unfortunate since it has inevitably led to great confusion of thought and of principle. It is equally misleading to speak of criminal negligence since this is merely to use an expression to explain itself.

On the facts, Judson found that there was overlap between the laws however "there is no conflict between these provisions in the sense that they are repugnant". The provincial law extended to include "inadvertent negligence" as well as regular negligence. It was enough that "the two pieces of legislation differed both in legislative purpose and legal and practical effect" to justify both of them.

=== Dissenting reasons ===
Justices Cartwright and Locke, in dissent, held that there is no possibility of overlapping domains. He stated that the leading case on the matter, Provincial Secretary of Prince Edward Island v. Egan, cannot be read so broadly as to give the provinces unlimited powers over highways. Matters in relation to those within the federal government's powers are exclusive and comprehensive and do not allow for complementary law:

In my opinion when Parliament has expressed in an Act its decision that a certain kind or degree of negligence in the operation of a motor vehicle shall be punishable as a crime against the state it follows that it has decided that no less culpable kind or degree of negligence in such operation shall be so punishable. By necessary implication the Act says not only what kinds or degrees of negligence shall be punishable but also what kinds or degrees shall not.

On the facts, he found that there was no difference between the provincial Act and the provision in the Criminal Code which occupies a domain exclusive to the federal government.

== See also ==
- List of Supreme Court of Canada cases (Richards Court through Fauteux Court)
