= McKay v R =

Judgement of the Supreme Court of Canada

- Supreme Court of Canada

Hearing: February 18, 19, 1965 Judgment: June 24, 1965
- Full case name: McKay et al. v. The Queen
- Citations: 1965 CanLII 3 (SCC), [1965] SCR 798

Court membership
- Chief Justice: Robert Taschereau; Puisne Justices: John Robert Cartwright, Gérald Fauteux, Douglas Abbott, Ronald Martland, Wilfred Judson, Roland Ritchie, Emmett Hall, Wishart Spence

Reasons given
- Majority: Cartwright, joined by Taschereau C.J., Abbott, Judson and Spence JJ.
- Dissent: Martland J., joined by Fauteux, Ritchie and Hall JJ.

McKay v R, (1965) S.C.R. 798 is an early election law decision of the Supreme Court of Canada on the constitutionality of laws that limited the erection of election signs. The Court held that a municipal zoning regulation against signs on residential properties could not include federal election signs. The reading down of the municipal by-law to not include Federal election signs evidences an early stage in the evolution of the Interjurisdictional immunity legal doctrine.

== See also ==
- List of Supreme Court of Canada cases (Richards Court through Fauteux Court)
