= List of Supreme Court of Canada cases (Richards Court through Fauteux Court) =

This is a chronological list of notable cases decided by the Supreme Court of Canada from the formation of the Court in 1875 to the retirement of Gérald Fauteux in 1973.

Note that the Privy Council heard appeals for criminal cases until 1933 and for civil cases until 1949. Also between 1888 and 1926, no criminal appeals were allowed to the Privy Council.

== 1875–99 ==
Case name	Citation	Date	Subject
April 8, 1875 – Act of Parliament creates the Supreme Court of Canada
Kelly v Sulivan	(1876)		First case heard by Supreme Court of Canada

== 1900 – 1949 ==
Case name	Citation	Date	Subject
Quong Wing v R	(1914), 49 SCR 44		Constitutionality of provincial statute regulating "Chinamen"
Bedard v Dawson	[1923] SCR 681	June 15, 1923	Federalism and criminal law
R v Eastern Terminal Elevator Co	[1925]		Trade and Commerce power.
Lethbridge Northern Irrigation District v Maunsell	[1926] SCR 603		Appellant held responsible for flood damage due to underground seepage into non-adjacent property
Edwards v Canada (AG)	[1928] SCR 276		"Persons Case"
1933 – Statute of Westminster, no more criminal appeals to Privy Council
Reference Re Companies' Creditors Arrangement Act	[1934] SCR 659		
Reference Re Alberta Statutes	[1938] SCR 100		
Reference Re Eskimos	[1939] SCR 104		Constitutional status of Inuit
Christie v York	(1939), [1940] SCR 139		racial discrimination
Home Oil Distributors Ltd v British Columbia (AG)	[1940] SCR 444		
Provincial Secretary of Prince Edward Island v Egan	[1941] SCR 396		division of powers
Reference Re Persons of Japanese Race	[1946] SCR 248		constitutionality of Japanese deportation order
Margarine Reference	[1949] SCR 1		Defining criminal law under the constitution
1949 – no more civil appeals to the Privy Council

== 1950 – 1959 ==
Case name	Citation	Date	Subject
Frey v Fedoruk	[1950] SCR 517		Breach of the peace, peeping toms
Noble v Alley	[1951] SCR 64	December 18, 1950	
R v Boucher	[1951] SCR 265		Seditious libel
Johannesson v West St Paul (Rural Municipality of)	[1952] 1 SCR 292		
Azoulay v The Queen	[1952] 2 SCR 495		Abortion
Saumur v Quebec (City of)	[1953] 2 SCR 299		
Henry Birks & Sons (Montreal) Ltd v Montreal (City of)	[1955] SCR 799		
Reference Re Farm Products Marketing Act (Ontario)	[1957] SCR 198		
Switzman v Elbling	[1957] SCR 285		constitutional division of powers
Beaver v R	[1957] SCR 531	June 26, 1957	subjective mens rea required for possession
Priestman v Colangelo	[1959] SCR 615		Duty of Care in public service conduct.
Roncarelli v Duplessis	[1959] SCR 121		constitution, arbitrary action by government.

== 1960 – 1969 ==
Case name	Citation	Date	Subject
August 10, 1960 – Canadian Bill of Rights was enacted.
O'Grady v Sparling	[1960] SCR 804		
R v George	[1960] SCR 871		intoxication defence
McKay v R	[1965] SCR 798		Election law
Munro v National Capital Commission	[1966] SCR 663		powers of the NCC to expropriate and use land
Peso Silver Mines Ltd v Cropper	[1966] SCR 673	June 20, 1966	director fiduciary duties
Carnation Co v Quebec (Agricultural Marketing Board)	[1968] SCR 238		overlap of provincial law with federal commerce laws
R v Whitfield	(1969), [1970] SCR 46		Definition of arrest
Walter v Alberta (AG)	[1969] SCR 383		division of powers; law excluding hutterites.

== 1970–73 ==
Case name	Citation	Date	Subject
R v Drybones	[1970] SCR 282	November 20, 1969	Canadian Bill of Rights
Libbey-Owens-Ford Glass Co v Ford Motor Co of Canada Ltd	[1970] SCR 833	April 28, 1970	Patents
R v Wray	[1971] SCR 272	June 26, 1970	pre-Charter right to silence
Caloil Inc v Canada (AG)	[1971] SCR 543	November 24, 1970	Trade and Commerce power, Constitution Act, 1867
Highway Properties Ltd v Kelly, Douglas and Co Ltd	[1971] SCR 562, [1972] 2 WWR 28, 1971 CanLII 123	February 1, 1971	Commercial landlord-tenant relationships
Manitoba (AG) v Manitoba Egg and Poultry Association	[1971] SCR 689	June 28, 1971	Trade and Commerce power, Constitution Act, 1867
Horsley v MacLaren (The Ogopogo)	[1972] SCR 441	October 5, 1971	civil duty to rescue
Duke v R	[1972] SCR 917	June 29, 1972	fundamental justice
Tennessee Eastman Co v Canada (Commissioner of Patents)	[1974] SCR 111	December 22, 1972	Patents
Calder v British Columbia (AG)	[1973] SCR 313	January 31, 1973	Aboriginal land title
Canadian Aero Service Ltd v O'Malley	[1974] SCR 592	June 29, 1973	Fiduciary duty owed by corporate officers

== See also ==
- List of Judicial Committee of the Privy Council cases
- List of notable Canadian Courts of Appeals cases
