= Priestman v Colangelo =

Judgement of the Supreme Court of Canada

- Supreme Court of Canada

Hearing: December 10, 11, 12, 1958 Judgment: April 28, 1959
- Full case name: Priestman v. Colangelo, Shynall and Smythson
- Citations: 1959 CanLII 14 (SCC), [1959] SCR 615

Court membership
- Chief Justice: Patrick Kerwin; Puisne Justices: Robert Taschereau, Ivan Rand, Charles Holland Locke, John Robert Cartwright, Gerald Fauteux, Douglas Abbott, Ronald Martland, Wilfred Judson

Reasons given

Priestman v Colangelo S.C.R. 615, 19 DLR (2d) 1 (1959) is a leading Supreme Court of Canada decision on the exemption of police officers and other public authorities from being held liable for tortious acts. This case is also the most famous of the series of "stumbling police" cases dealt with by the Supreme Court during this era.

== Synopsis ==
A police officer was pursuing a car theft suspect when the officer attempted to shoot out the rear tire of the suspect's car. The bullet missed the tire, but hit the driver instead, causing him to drive off the road and kill two pedestrians. The Court held that the officer was not liable because he had acted reasonably in the course of his statutory duty to apprehend the suspect. A test for negligence was proposed by Locke J., viz:

"If the circumstances are such that the legislature must have contemplated that the exercise of a statutory power and the discharge of a statutory duty might interfere with private rights, and the person to whom the power is given and upon whom the duty is imposed acts reasonably, such interference will not give rise to an action."

== Notes ==
1. other cases include Robertson v. Joyce (1948), 92 C.C.C. 382 and Beim v. Goyer (1965), 57 D.L.R. (2d) 253.
