= Beaver v R =

Beaver v The Queen
- Supreme Court of Canada

Hearing: May 30, 1957 Judgment: June 26, 1957
- Full case name: Louis Beaver v. Her Majesty the Queen
- Citations: [1957] S.C.R. 531
- Prior history: Judgment for the Crown in the Court of Appeal for Ontario.
- Ruling: Appeal allowed in part.

Holding
- A person must know that the substance they possess is a drug to be guilty of possession of that drug.

Court membership
- Chief Justice: Patrick Kerwin; Puisne Justices: Robert Taschereau, Ivan Rand, Roy Kellock, Charles Holland Locke, John Robert Cartwright, Gerald Fauteux, Douglas Abbott, Henry Grattan Nolan

Reasons given
- Majority: Cartwright J., joined by Rand and Locke J.
- Dissent: Fauteux J., joined by Abbott J.
- Kerwin C.J., and Taschereau, Kellock, and Nolan JJ. took no part in the consideration or decision of the case.

Beaver v The Queen [1957] is a leading decision of the Supreme Court of Canada on the mens rea requirement in criminal law to prove "possession". The Court held that an offence based on possession, such as possession of a narcotic, requires the Crown to prove that the accused had subjective knowledge of the nature of the object in possession.

== Background ==
Louis Beaver and his brother Max Beaver were arrested selling heroin to an undercover RCMP officer and charged with possession and sale of an illegal narcotic under the Opium and Narcotic Drug Act. Max was the one in actual physical possession of the drug but Louis was charged by association as he knew Max had the heroin.

In defence, Louis claimed that he thought the package was milk sugar and that they were only trying to defraud the RCMP officer.

At trial, the judge instructed the jury by telling them that if they find that they were in possession their actual knowledge was irrelevant.

The issue before the Supreme Court was whether a conviction based on possession requires knowledge of the nature of the object.

== Opinion of the Court ==
The Court held that knowledge was required. Cartwright J., writing for the majority stated that it is a fundamental principle of criminal law that the Mens rea of an element of an offence must be proven to secure a conviction. It has been established that provisions in the Drug Act are criminal law, and that any offence that allows a punishment of prison requires proof of mens rea.

The Court held that Beaver did not know the character of the substance, and he was acquitted of possession. However, he did represent the substance as a narcotic and therefore was convicted on the charge of selling a narcotic.

== See also ==
- List of Supreme Court of Canada cases (Richards Court through Fauteux Court)
