= Reference re Agricultural Products Marketing =

Reference Re Agricultural Products Marketing
- Supreme Court of Canada

Hearing: Judgment: 1978-01-19
- Citations: [1978] 2 SCR 1198, 1978 CanLII 10 (SCC)
- Prior history: APPEAL from a judgment of the Court of Appeal for Ontario in the matter of a reference of certain questions under The Constitutional Questions Act, R.S.O. 1970, c. 79.
- Ruling: Appeal allowed in part.

Court membership
- Chief Justice: Bora Laskin; Puisne Justices: Ronald Martland, Roland Ritchie, Wishart Spence, Louis-Philippe Pigeon, Brian Dickson, Jean Beetz, Willard Estey, Yves Pratte

Reasons given
- Majority: Martland, Ritchie, Pigeon, Beetz and de Grandpré JJ.
- Concur/dissent: Laskin C.J. and Judson, Spence and Dickson JJ.

Reference Re Agricultural Products Marketing (also known as the Egg Reference), [1978] 2 S.C.R. 1198 is a landmark constitutional decision of the Supreme Court of Canada on cooperative federalism where the Court unanimously upheld the validity of various Acts passed by the Parliament of Canada and the Legislative Assembly of Ontario for establishing a national agricultural marketing scheme agreed upon by the federal and provincial governments.

== Background ==
The marketing of agricultural products has had a turbulent history in Canada. In 1949, the Parliament of Canada enacted the Agricultural Products Marketing Act in order to regulate extraprovincial trade. By the 1960s, Ontario and other provinces had settled on a model of marketing boards for specified agricultural products, while the federal government started to set up national schemes as with the Canadian Dairy Commission.

Many provinces, but especially Ontario and Quebec, entered into the "Chicken and Egg War" of 1971, where they used their powers to retaliate against each other's products. This resulted in the passage of the Farm Products Marketing Agencies Act by the Parliament of Canada that came into force in December 1972, and the Canadian Egg Marketing Agency was the first scheme to be created on a national scale under it.

In 1976, the Ontario government posed several reference questions to the Court of Appeal for Ontario as to the constitutionality of the entire federal-provincial scheme. In particular, the following Acts were specified:

- the Agricultural Products Marketing Act (Canada), R.S.C. 1970, Chapter A-7, (which allowed the federal government to authorize provincial marketing agencies to regulate interprovincial and export trade),
- the Farm Products Marketing Agencies Act (Canada), 19-20-21, Eliz. II, Chapter 65, (which authorized the federal government to establish national marketing agencies with such powers in specified circumstances), and
- the Farm Products Marketing Act (Ontario), R.S.O. 1970, c. 162, (which authorized the creation of marketing agencies in Ontario, specifying their powers, and authorizing them to cooperate with agencies created by Canada and other provinces).

== At the Court of Appeal for Ontario ==
The Court of Appeal upheld the validity of the scheme, with Dubin J.A. (as he then was) dissenting only with respect to two provisions. The Attorney General of Quebec, together with several groups of egg producers, appealed the result to the Supreme Court of Canada.

== At the Supreme Court of Canada ==
The scheme was generally upheld, with the appeal being allowed only in part. The majority generally adopted the reasons given by Laskin, C.J., subject to reservations.

Question	Martland, Ritchie, Pigeon, Beetz and de Grandpré JJ.	Laskin C.J. and Judson, Spence and Dickson JJ.
1. Are sections 2 and 3 of the Agricultural Products Marketing Act, R.S.C. 1970, Chapter A-7, ultra vires the Parliament of Canada in whole or in part and if so, in what respect and to what extent?	Yes as to s. 2(2)(a); No as to s. 2.(2)(b) as well as to s. 3 in respect thereto.	No, as to s. 2(1); yes, as to s. 2(2)(a); no, as to s. 2(2)(b); and no, as to s. 3 in respect of s. 2(1) and s. 2(2)(b).
2. Are S.O.R./72-243; (Ontario Egg Order) S.O.R./72-246, S.O.R./72-306, S.O.R./73-228 and S.O.R./75-217 (Ontario Egg Marketing Levies Orders) ultra vires the enabling legislation, the Agricultural Products Marketing Act, R.S.C. 1970, Chapter A‑7, in whole or in part and if so, in what respect and to what extent?	No	No
3. Is the Farm Products Marketing Agencies Act, 19-20-21, Eliz. II, Chapter 65, and in particular; (a) Sections 2(e)(vi), 18 and 23 and (b) Sections 6, 7, 17 and 32 ultra vires the Parliament of Canada in whole or in part and if so, in what respect and to what extent?	No, but s. 23(1)(a) does not authorize a federal agency to purchase surpluses in any market and to dispose of its purchases as an ordinary trader	No, as it does not contravene Section 121 of the Constitution Act, 1867
4. (a) Is S.O.R./73-1 (Canadian Egg Marketing Agency Proclamation) ultra vires the enabling legislation the Farm Products Marketing Agencies Act, 19‑20-21, Eliz. II, Chapter 65, in whole or in part and if so, in what respect and to what extent?; (b) Is S.O.R./73-1 section 10 ultra vires the enabling legislation the Farm Products Marketing Agencies Act, 19‑20-21, Eliz. II, Chapter 65, in whole or in part and if so, in what respect and to what extent?	No	No
5. (a) Are S.O.R./73-284 (Canada Egg Marketing Levies Order), S.O.R./74-89 (Canada Egg Marketing Levies Order), S.O.R./74-207 (Canada Interim Egg Levies Order), S.O.R./75-173 (Canada Interim Egg Levies Order) ultra vires the enabling legislation, The Farm Products Marketing Agencies Proclamation, in whole or in part, and if so, in what respect and to what extent?; (b) Are S.O.R./74-208 (Canada Egg Purchasing Levies Order), S.O.R./74‑329 (Canada Egg Purchasing Levies Order), S.O.R./-74-393 (Canada Egg Purchasing Levies Order), S.O.R./74-562 (Canada Egg Purchasing Levies Order), S.O.R./74-644 (Canada Egg Purchasing Levies Order), S.O.R./75-89 (Canada Egg Purchasing Levies Order) and S.O.R./75-174 (Canada Egg Purchasing Levies Order) ultra vires the enabling legislation, the Farm Products Marketing Agencies Proclamation, in whole or in part, and if so, in what respect and to what extent?	No	No
6. Is S.O.R./73-286 (Canadian Egg Licensing Regulations) ultra vires the enabling legislation, The Farm Products Marketing Agencies Act and the Canadian Egg Marketing Proclamation, in whole or in part, and if so, in what respect and to what extent?	No	No
7. Are sections 4, 5, 6, 8, 9, 10, 15(a) and 22 of the Farm Products Marketing Act of Ontario and amendments thereto ultra vires the Legislature of Ontario in whole or in part, and if so, in what respect and to what extent?	No, as a Legislature may delegate powers to an agency as much as it sees fit, and there is no reason to read this Act as going beyond its professed intent	No, as the Act itself would not be impeachable as encroaching on federal power, but its overreaching administration would be invalidated as going beyond the scope of power conferred by the Act, as well as being in itself unconstitutional
8. Is Ontario Regulation 595/72 ultra vires the legislative power of Ontario in whole or in part and if so, in what respect and to what extent?	No, as the control of production, whether agricultural or industrial, is prima facie a local matter, a matter of provincial jurisdiction, subject to s. 95 of the Constitution Act, 1867	No, as the fact that a Province has adopted the same share percentage as determined under a federal order does not per se rule out its connection with intraprovincial trade
9. Is section 21a of the Farm Products Marketing Act of Ontario ultra vires the Legislature of Ontario in whole or in part and if so, in what respect and to what extent?	No, as for #8	No, as for #8
10. Are Regulations 2, 3, 5, 6 and 7 for the year 1975 passed by the Ontario Egg Producers Marketing Board ultra vires the enabling legislation, the Farm Products Marketing Act of Ontario, in whole or in part, and if so, in what respect and to what extent?	No	No

== Impact ==
The ruling established the following points:

- The federal (apart from two provisions) and Ontario Acts were upheld in total, including numerous regulations thereunder, particularly including quota systems.
- Authority to impose levies, long thought to be strictly a federal matter, was declared to be a matter of dual jurisdiction, depending on where the product upon which the levy is imposed is marketed.

Following the ruling, national marketing agencies were subsequently established with respect to chickens, turkeys and broiler eggs.

The approval that was given to the operation of federal-provincial schemes has also been called the cooperative federalism approach, which has been employed in other areas of shared jurisdiction, and how far that can go was recently discussed in Reference re Securities Act.

== See also ==
- Canadian Egg Marketing Agency v Richardson
- Manitoba (AG) v Manitoba Egg and Poultry Association

== Resource ==
- Skogstad, Grace (31 July 2014). "Agriculture and Food Policy". The Canadian Encyclopedia (online ed.). Historica Canada.
