= Pettkus v Becker =

- Supreme Court of Canada

Hearing: June 23, 1980 Judgment: December 18, 1980
- Full case name: Lothar Pettkus v Rosa Becker
- Citations: [1980] 2 S.C.R. 834

Court membership
- Chief Justice: Bora Laskin; Puisne Justices: Ronald Martland, Roland Ritchie, Brian Dickson, Jean Beetz, Willard Estey, William McIntyre, Julien Chouinard, Antonio Lamer

Reasons given
- Majority: Dickson J., joined by Laskin C.J. and Estey, McIntyre, Chouinard and Lamer JJ.
- Concurrence: Ritchie J.
- Concurrence: Martland J.

Pettkus v Becker [1980] 2 S.C.R. 834 was a landmark family law decision of the Supreme Court of Canada. The Court established a new formulation of the constructive trust as a remedy for unjust enrichment based on the ideas of Professor Donovan Waters, and in particular the requirements for such constructive trust in a common law relationship separation. The Pettkus formulation of constructive trust was subsequently adopted elsewhere in the common law world.

== Background ==
Rosa Becker and Lothar Pettkus, two immigrants to Canada, met in 1955. They moved in together and lived as husband and wife, although they did not marry, and they had no children. Until 1960, Becker paid the rent and living expenses from her outside income and Pettkus deposited his income in a bank account in his name. In 1961, they bought a farm in Quebec. The money came from Pettkus' account and ownership ("title") was taken out in his name, as was the custom in those days.

They shared the farm labour and both worked very hard. They turned their farm into a profitable bee-keeping operation. Becker also earned some income which was used for household expenses and to repair the farmhouse. Their savings went back into the farm or the Pettkus bank account.

In 1971, with profits from the farm and more money from Pettkus' bank account, they purchased a property in Ontario and again registered it in his name. In 1972, Becker separated from Pettkus. He threw $3,000 on the floor and told her to take it, along with a car and forty beehives with bees.

At his request, she moved back in with him three months later. She returned with the car, deposited $1,900 in his account, and the forty bee-hives without the bees. Shortly thereafter, with these returned assets, joint savings and proceeds from the sale of the Quebec land, they purchased another Ontario farm in Pettkus' name. They now had two valuable pieces of land, and in 1974 they moved and built a house upon one of them. They lived off their income from their thriving bee-keeping business. In the fall of that year, she left him for good, taking the car and $2,600 in cash.

She also sued for a one-half interest in the properties, bee-keeping business and assets acquired through their joint efforts. Pettkus and Becker had lived together as husband and wife for almost twenty years. Under Ontario legislation at that time, a common law wife was not legally entitled to a share in any property owned by her husband. Therefore, any remedy for Becker would have to be based on the wholly equitable doctrine of constructive trust and principles of unjust enrichment.

== Reasons of the court ==
Dickson J. set out three requirements for finding a constructive trust. There must be 1) an enrichment; 2) a corresponding deprivation; and 3) the absence of any juristic reason for the enrichment. In this case, Dickson found that the requirements were satisfied and held that Becker was entitled to half the assets. He held that: "where one person, in a relationship tantamount to spousal, prejudices herself in the reasonable expectation of receiving an interest in property, and the other person in the relationship freely accepts benefits conferred by the first person in circumstances where he knows or ought to have known of that reasonable expectation, it would be unjust to allow the recipient of the benefit to retain it."

== Aftermath ==
After the ruling in Becker's favour, Pettkus avoided paying out the money owed. When Pettkus's assets were finally liquidated, Becker's lawyer took most of the share, and left her with nothing. In a tragic turn of events, Becker committed suicide with a gunshot to the head on November 5, 1986. The suicide note accused the legal system of forcing her to do it. Several provinces subsequently amended their family relations legislation to include common law relationships as to the division of family assets. (Under the Canadian Constitution divorce is governed by federal statute, property by provincial statute.

Pettkus with its new version of the constructive trust was soon adopted in Australia. The High Court of Australia enunciated a similar rule in Muschinski v Dodds (1985) 160 CLR 583 and Baumgartner v Baumgartner (1987) 164 CLR 137, albeit with the caveat that the complaining party must not have been responsible for the breakdown of the relationship.

== See also ==
- Murdoch v. Murdoch a similar controversial matrimonial property case.
