= Labatt Breweries of Canada Ltd v Canada (AG) =

- Supreme Court of Canada

Hearing: June 27–28, 1979 Judgment: December 21, 1979
- Full case name: Labatt Breweries of Canada Limited v Attorney General of Canada
- Citations: [1980] 1 S.C.R. 914
- Prior history: APPEAL from a judgment of the Federal Court of Appeal ([1980] 1 FC 241), setting aside Labatt Breweries of Canada Ltd v Attorney-General of Canada, 1978 CanLII 2074, 84 DLR (3d) 61 (10 January 1978) (Federal Court). Appeal allowed, Laskin CJ and Pigeon and Mclntyre JJ dissenting.

Court membership
- Chief Justice: Bora Laskin; Puisne Justices: Ronald Martland, Roland Ritchie, Louis-Philippe Pigeon, Brian Dickson, Jean Beetz, Willard Estey, Yves Pratte, William McIntyre

Reasons given
- Majority: Estey J, joined by Martland, Ritchie, Dickson, Beetz and Pratte JJ
- Dissent: Laskin CJ, joined by Pigeon and Mclntyre JJ

Labatt Breweries of Canada Ltd v Canada (AG), 1979 CanLII 190, [1980] 1 SCR 914 is a leading constitutional decision of the Supreme Court of Canada on the division of powers under the Constitution Act, 1867. The Court held that the part of the federal Food and Drugs Act which prohibited the selling of "light" beer without labelling it to indicate its composition and purity was outside of the authority of the federal government to legislate.

== Background ==
Labatt Brewing Co. produced a line of beer with a 4 per cent alcohol content that was labelled as "Labatt's Special Lite" and was sold in Ontario and British Columbia. Under Food and Drug Regulations beers could only be called "light" if it contained between 1.2 and 2.5 per cent alcohol.

Labatt sought a declaration that its "lite beer" would not be subject to the requirements for "light beer" under the regulations.

== Opinion of the Court ==
The Court held that despite that the law was accompanied by a penalty of imprisonment and was related to health and safety, it was not enough to save the Act under the Constitution's Criminal law power. The provisions were found to be regulatory in nature and not prohibitory. Equally, the law could not be saved under the peace, order and good government power of the Constitution Act, 1867. The Court found three cases where the p.o.g.g. power applies: 1) a national emergency; 2) for subject-matter that did not exist at confederation; 3) where the subject-matter is outside of the fields of "local or private nature" and concerns the entire country.

Chief Justice Laskin, in dissent, argued that the Act could be upheld under the general trade branch of the Trade and Commerce power. He believed that the federal government should be permitted to "fix standards that are common to all manufacturers of foods, including beer, drugs, cosmetics and therapeutic devices, at least to equalize competitive advantages in the carry on the businesses concerned with such products."

== Aftermath ==
The case has proven controversial with legal scholars. Many found that the Court had overstepped its bounds by focusing too much on the efficiency of the law, which is a matter reserved only for lawmakers.

== See also ==
- List of Supreme Court of Canada cases (Laskin Court)
