= Reference Re Farm Products Marketing Act (Ontario) =

- Supreme Court of Canada

Hearing: 24–26 April 1956, 19–20 November 1956 Judgment: 22 January 1957
- Citations: [1957] SCR 198

Court membership
- Chief Justice: Patrick Kerwin; Puisne Justices: Robert Taschereau, Ivan Rand, Roy Kellock, Charles Holland Locke, John Robert Cartwright, Gerald Fauteux, Douglas Abbott, Henry Grattan Nolan

Reasons given
- Kellock J took no part in the consideration or decision of the case.

Reference Re Farm Products Marketing Act (Ontario), 1957 S.C.R. 198 is a leading Supreme Court of Canada decision on the Trade and Commerce power allocated to the federal government under section 91(2) of the Constitution Act, 1867. The Court held that the Trade and Commerce power applied not just to trade but also to the flow of goods.

The Ontario Farm Products Marketing Act was challenged as ultra vires the province. The Court split four to four on whether the law was valid.

Chief Justice Fauteux, held that the Act had an effect on inter-provincial trade and so it could not be upheld as a "matter of a local nature" under section 92 (16) of the Constitution Act, 1867. Rather, the Act concerned the "flow of goods" which was part of the Trade power. Rand J., in a concurring opinion, added that the demarcation between trade, production, and manufacturing must be considered. “That demarcation must observe this rule, that if in a trade activity, including manufacture or production, there is involved a matter of extraprovincial interest or concern its regulation thereafter in the aspect of trade is by that fact put beyond Provincial power.” Consequently, some intra-provincial trade can be regulated federally as well as inter-provincial trade.

It is one of the earliest cases following the abolition of appeals to the Privy Council in 1949, in which the Supreme Court did not consider itself bound by its own past decisions.

== See also ==
- List of Supreme Court of Canada cases
