= Canadian Egg Marketing Agency v Richardson =

- Supreme Court of Canada

Hearing: March 19, 1998 Judgment: November 5, 1998
- Full case name: Canadian Egg Marketing Agency v. Pineview Poultry Products Ltd. and Frank Richardson operating as Northern Poultry
- Citations: [1998] 3 S.C.R. 157
- Docket No.: 25192
- Prior history: Judgment against the Canadian Egg Marketing Agency in the Court of Appeal for the Northwest Territories.
- Ruling: Appeal allowed

Holding
- 1. Corporations who are defendants in civil litigation instigated by the state have the right to raise an argument under the Canadian Charter of Rights and Freedoms.; 2. In regards to section 6 of the Charter, sections 6(2)(b) and 6(3)(a) should be read together as forming one right.; 3. The purpose of the mobility rights under section 6 of the Charter is to protect against human rights discrimination, not economic discrimination.; 4. The mobility rights under section 6 of the Charter include the ability to create wealth in another province, not just the ability to physically move to another province.

Court membership
- Chief Justice: Antonio Lamer; Puisne Justices: Claire L'Heureux-Dubé, Charles Gonthier, Peter Cory, Beverley McLachlin, Frank Iacobucci, John C. Major, Michel Bastarache, Ian Binnie

Reasons given
- Majority: Iacobucci and Bastarache JJ., joined by Lamer C.J. and L'Heureux-Dubé, Gonthier, Cory, and Binnie JJ.
- Dissent: McLachlin J., joined by Major J.

Canadian Egg Marketing Agency v Richardson, [1998] 3 S.C.R. 157 is a decision of the Supreme Court of Canada on standing to challenge a law as a violation of the Constitution of Canada. The Court expanded the exception first established in R. v. Big M Drug Mart to allow corporations to invoke the Canadian Charter of Rights and Freedoms in civil litigation. The corporation had claimed rights to freedom of association and freedom of movement under section 2(d) and section 6 of the Charter.

== See also ==
- Manitoba (AG) v Manitoba Egg and Poultry Association
- Reference Re Agricultural Products Marketing
- List of Supreme Court of Canada cases (Lamer Court)
