= R v Wray =

Pre-Charter decision of the Supreme Court of Canada

R v Wray, [1971] S.C.R. 272 is a famous pre-Charter decision of the Supreme Court of Canada on the exclusion of improperly obtained evidence. The Court, following the English common law established in Kuruma v R, [1955] A.C. 197 (P.C.), held that judges had no discretion to exclude evidence whose admission would bring the administration of justice into disrepute.

The police arrested Wray in connection with a murder. Through the use of forceful interrogation techniques they managed to get inculpatory information from him and had him show the police where he left evidence of his crime.

At trial the judge held that the evidence must be excluded.

Martland, with Fauteux, Abbott, Ritchie, and Pigeon concurring, held that the judge did not have the discretion to exclude the evidence. They distinguished between unfair methods of collecting evidence, which should never be the basis of evidence exclusion, and unfair trial process, which should always result in exclusion of evidence. Neither of these two cases could be subject to any discretion.

In dissent, Cartwright found that all the precedents pointed to a common notion that the accused cannot be forced to self-incriminate, which implied that a judge would necessarily require discretion on the exclusion of evidence.

== See also ==
- List of Supreme Court of Canada cases (Richards Court through Fauteux Court)
