= Henry Birks & Sons (Montreal) Ltd v Montreal (City of) =

Judgement of the Supreme Court of Canada

Henry Birks & Sons (Montreal) Ltd v Montreal (City of), [1955] S.C.R. 799 was an early constitutional decision of the Supreme Court of Canada where the Court struck down a provincial law permitting municipalities to pass by-laws for the closing of stores on certain Catholic feast days. Henry Birks and Sons, a chain of jewelry stores, objected to the lost business on holidays. The Court held that the law was a matter of public morals and therefore fell within the exclusive criminal law powers of the federal government and so was ultra vires the competence of the province. This case marked the first of a gradual shift in Canadian law away from non-secular laws.

== See also ==
- List of Supreme Court of Canada cases (Richards Court through Fauteux Court)
- R. v. Big M Drug Mart
- R. v. Edwards Books and Art Ltd.
