= Provincial Secretary of Prince Edward Island v Egan =

Canadian constitutional law case

Provincial Secretary of Prince Edward Island v. Egan
- Supreme Court of Canada

Hearing: February 26-27, 1941 Judgment: April 22, 1941
- Citations: [1941] SCR 396, 1941 CanLII 1 (SCC)

Court membership
- Chief Justice: Lyman Duff; Puisne Justices: Thibaudeau Rinfret, Oswald Smith Crocket, Henry Hague Davis, Patrick Kerwin, Albert Hudson, Robert Taschereau

Reasons given

Provincial Secretary of Prince Edward Island v Egan, [1941] S.C.R. 396 is a famous constitutional decision of the Supreme Court of Canada.The Court upheld a provincial Act, which provided that anyone who was convicted of an impaired driving offence under the Criminal Code will have their licence suspended, on the basis that the law was in relation to the regulation of highway safety which is a valid provincial subject.

The case later became central to another key constitutional decision of O'Grady v. Sparling, [1960] S.C.R. 804.

== See also ==
- List of Supreme Court of Canada cases (Richards Court through Fauteux Court)
