= Hall-Dennis Report =

The Hall-Dennis Report, officially titled Living and Learning: The Report of the Provincial Committee on Aims and Objectives of Education in the Schools of Ontario, called for broad reforms to Ontario's education to empower teachers and the broader community and to put students' needs and dignity at the centre of education.

The report was commissioned by Ontario Education Minister Bill Davis in 1965 and delivered to him in 1968. Multiple attempts were made to implement it in the 1970s.

The common name for the report comes from its two co-chairman: Emmett Hall, a judge of the Supreme Court of Canada, and Lloyd A. Dennis, a former school principal.

The report cautioned that form can overtake function and that new educational programs must be constantly reappraised.

Large-scale experiments were done in the 1970s, including team teaching and open classrooms.

The teaching of history became more student-centred, with more awareness of searching for truth. There was also an increased sensitivity to marginalized peoples.

== Sections ==
The report is divided into the following sections:

- The Truth Shall Make You Free
- The Search for Truth in a Democratic Society
- The Cultural Environment
- Today's Child
- The Children of Ontario
- Rooms in the Mansion
- Early School Years
- Work and Leisure
- A Sensitivity to Life
- The Learning Experience
- On Aims of Education
- Aims Based on Analysis of Complete Living
- Aims Related to Growth and Development
- Statements Related to Aims by Recent Leaders in Education
- The Learning Program
- Various Curriculum Considerations
- Special Learning Situations
- The Dimensions of the Problem
- The World of Teaching
- Organizing for Learning
- Fundamental Issues in Ontario Education
- A Parting Word

=== Truth Shall Make You Free ===
This section introduces the need for reform and the guiding principles of the committee, and begins making recommendations.

==== Need for reform ====
"Today, on every side, however, there is heard a growing demand for a fresh look at education in Ontario. The Committee was told of inflexible programs, outdated curricula, unrealistic regulations, regimented organization, and mistaken aims of education. We heard from alienated students, frustrated teachers, irate parents, and concerned educators. Many public organizations and private individuals have told us of their growing discontent and lack of confidence in a school system which, in their opinion, has become outmoded and is failing those it exists to serve."

==== Guiding principles ====
The Hall-Dennis committee was guided by the principles of the United Nations Declaration on the Rights of the Child, including:

- "Everyone has the right to education"
- "Education shall be directed to the full development of the human personality"
- "Parents have a prior right to choose the kind of education that shall be given to their children."

==== Recommendations ====
There are many recommendations throughout this section, including:

- "greater public involvement, a greater partnership between the home and school, between the community and the school."
- "the establishment of an autonomous, non-political advisory body of citizens, representative of the various interests of the people in Ontario"
- "The lock-step structure of past times must give way...[The student's] natural curiosity and initiative must be recognized and developed"
- "The fixed positions of pupil and teacher...must give way to a more relaxed teacher-pupil relationship which will encourage discussion, inquiry, and experimentation, and enhance the dignity of the individual."
- "the school must be aware of the health and emotional needs of pupils."
- "Educators ought to employ every conceivable device and means that society can make available, [but not] in a narrow, didactic manner and with groups of children all presumed to be learning the same thing at the same time."
