= Law clerk (parliamentary) =

Officer in some parliamentary systems

A law clerk, sometimes called parliamentary counsel, is an officer in some parliamentary systems. The law clerk is charged with providing advice on legal issues and parliamentary procedure to the Speaker and members of the chamber. The position is neutral and non-partisan.

In some systems, the law clerk is a separate officer responsible to the clerk of the chamber; in other systems, the duty to provide legal advice is part of the duties of the clerk of the chamber. Where the advisory functions of the Parliament are exercised by a Secretary-General, he is always the responsible for the legal advice of the President of the Chamber.

== Usage ==
=== Canada ===
==== Parliament of Canada ====
===== House of Commons =====
The Office of the Law Clerk and Parliamentary Counsel is part of the House Administration.

===== Senate of Canada =====
The Law Clerk and Parliamentary Counsel of the Senate is the chief legal advisor to the Senate of Canada and head of the Office of the Law Clerk and Parliamentary Counsel.

==== Saskatchewan ====
The Law Clerk and Parliamentary Counsel is a branch of the Parliamentary Counsel and Precinct, and provides confidential legal services to Members of the Legislative Assembly of Saskatchewan.

The position was formerly known as the Legislative Council and Law Clerk, but was changed to Law Clerk and Parliamentary Counsel in 2005.

=== United Kingdom ===
The Clerk of the Parliaments is the corporate officer for the House of Lords; the Clerk of the House of Commons is the corporate officer for that House. Their functions (as corporate officers) include: acquiring, holding, managing and disposing of land and other property on behalf of the House; entering into contracts for any purpose of the House; and doing any other thing which he can do by virtue of his office as Clerk.

== Theory ==
In Jeremy Bentham's opinion, no act of the assembly could be forged, because "a counterfaction of this kind could not well have had for its author any other person than either the ministerial officer (the clerk) who has the penning of the journals, or the presiding officer (the Speaker), under whose authority and command the other acts". From this seminal functions of the chief of parliamentary staff, other key functions have been added underpinning the parliamentary autonomy in administrations.

== See also ==
- List of Law Clerks and Parliamentary Counsel of the Canadian House of Commons
