= Arthur Jessup =

Arthur Robert Jessup

Personal details
- Born: November 13, 1914 Montreal, Quebec, Canada
- Died: August 5, 1990 (aged 75)

Arthur Robert Jessup (November 13, 1914 – August 5, 1990) was a Canadian judge born in Montreal, Quebec, Canada.

== World War II ==
During World War II (1939-45), he was a Major in the Canadian Army with the Governor General's Foot Guards. The Governor General's Foot Guards provided for the security of vital points in Ottawa at the beginning of the war and was mobilized as a regiment in May 1940. The battalion was converted to an armoured role in 1942 and assumed an additional prefix name to become the "21st Canadian Armoured Regiment (G.G.F.G.)". The Regiment landed in France in 1944 and served with distinction throughout the North West European Campaign.

He garnered a number of Battle Honors during World War II: The Hochwald, The Rhineland, Chambois, Falaise, Veen, The Scheldt, Falaise Road, Bad Zwichenahn, The Lower Maas, The Laison, North West Europe, 1944–1945. He was awarded the Croix de guerre by the Government of Belgium for his actions at the Battle of the Scheldt in 1944. Following the end of combat operations, he served an additional year in Europe as a lawyer representing those being tried under courts-martial.

== After the war ==
After his discharge from the Canadian Army in 1946, Arthur Jessup returned to his career as a lawyer.

He was appointed a Justice of the Supreme Court of Ontario (Trial Division) in 1964 and a Justice of the Ontario Court of Appeal in 1967.

He married Vera Marie Halladay on January 23, 1946, a few days after his return from the war. They had 6 children: Mary Jessup, John Jessup (died June 20, 1979), Colleen Smith, Ann Klein, Katie(Catherine) Carr and Maggie(Margaret)Stewart.

He died in Toronto on August 5, 1990, of emphysema.
