= Fish Canneries Reference =

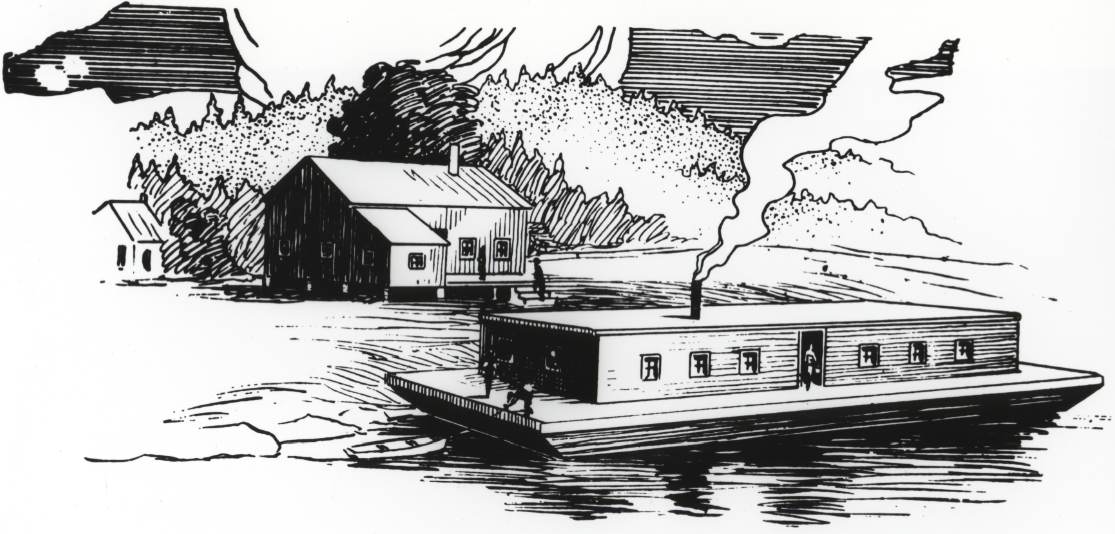
- Court: Judicial Committee of the Privy Council
- Full case name: The Attorney General of Canada v The Attorney General of British Columbia and others
- Decided: October 15, 1929
- Citation: [1929] UKPC 80, [1930] AC 111

Case history
- Prior actions: Reference as to constitutional validity of certain sections of The Fisheries Act, 1914, 1928 CanLII 82, [1928] SCR 457 (28 May 1928)
- Appealed from: Supreme Court of Canada

Court membership
- Judges sitting: The Lord Chancellor, Lord Darling, Lord Tomlin, Lord Thankerton, Sir Lancelot Sanderson

Case opinions
- Decision by: Lord Tomlin

Keywords
- fisheries, division of powers

Canada (AG) v British Columbia (AG), also known as the Reference as to constitutional validity of certain sections of The Fisheries Act, 1914 and the Fish Canneries Reference, is a significant decision of the Judicial Committee of the Privy Council in determining the boundaries of federal and provincial jurisdiction in Canada. It is also significant, in that it represented a major victory in the fight against discrimination aimed at Japanese Canadians, which was especially prevalent in British Columbia in the early part of the 20th century.

== Background ==
Until the early 1920s federal policy governing access to fishing licenses was basically open and non-discriminatory. In 1922, under what became known as the "oriental exclusion policy", this was revised to provide for the reduction of the number of licenses granted to Japanese-Canadian fishermen, aiming to eventual total elimination of such licenses. In addition, conditions were attached for the prohibition of gas motors on such fishermen's vessels.

The controversy came to a head in 1927 as a prosecution against the Somerville Cannery Company for operating a cannery in Prince Rupert without a federal license. The cannery was operating as a floating clam cannery, the only one of its kind. All other canneries were on land. Francis Millerd, general manager and part-owner of Somerville, challenged the oriental exclusion policy through hiring Japanese-Canadian fishermen and lobbying to secure salmon fishing licenses for them. Charges against Somerville were dismissed, on the grounds that fish canneries did not require a federal license. Further pressure by Somerville and the Association of Fishermen of Japanese Origin resulted in the following reference questions being posed to the Supreme Court of Canada:

1. Are sections 7A and 18 of the Fisheries Act, 1914, or either of them and in what particular or particulars or to what extent ultra vires of the Parliament of Canada?
2. If the said provisions of the Fisheries Act, 1914, or either of them be intra vires of the Parliament of Canada, has the Minister authority to issue a license for the operation of a floating cannery constructed on a float or ship, as contradistinguished from a stationary cannery constructed on land, and if so, is he entitled to make the license subject to any restrictions particularly as to the place of operation of any such cannery in British Columbia?
3. Under the provisions of the Special Fishery Regulations for the province of British Columbia (made by the Governor in Council under the authority of section 45 of the Fisheries Act, 1914), respecting licenses to fish, viz., subsection 3 of section 14; paragraph (a) or (b) of subsection 1 of section 15 or paragraph (a) of subsection 7 of section 24 of the said regulations, or under said section 7A or 18 of the said Act, (if these sections or either of them be intra vires of the Parliament of Canada), has

(a) any British subject resident in the province of British Columbia, or
(b) any person so resident who is not a British subject, upon application and tender of the prescribed fee, the right to receive a license to fish or to operate a fish or salmon cannery in that province, or has the Minister a discretionary authority to grant or refuse such license to any such person whether a British subject or not?

== At the Supreme Court of Canada ==
The Supreme Court unanimously held that the provisions cited in Question 1 were ultra vires the Parliament of Canada, as fish canning only occurs after the fish have been caught, thus not being within the federal fisheries jurisdiction. As a fish cannery is similar in nature to a fruit or vegetable cannery, it is a civil right in the province in which it is carried on, and therefore subject to provincial jurisdiction.

Nor could such provisions be saved by resorting to another head of power:

Within the spheres allotted to them by the (B.N.A.) Act the Dominion and the Provinces are rendered on general principle co-ordinate governments. As a consequence where one has legislative power the other has not, speaking broadly, the capacity to pass laws which will interfere with its exercise. What cannot be done directly cannot be done indirectly

It was unnecessary to answer Question 2.

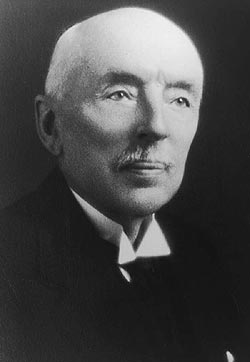
Newcombe J

In a 4-3 decision concerning Question 3, it was held that the Minister must issue fishing licenses to all qualified persons that paid the appropriate fee, and there was no discretionary authority to withhold such licenses.

Newcombe J (Anglin CJ and Rinfret and Lamont JJ, concurring) stated that the Minister could not exercise his licensing discretion in a discriminatory manner:

... no legislative power is delegated to the Minister, even if the Governor in Council could delegate any of his statutory powers. No express power is conferred upon the Minister, except to issue licenses, and, in my view, it is improbable that it was intended to confer a reviewable discretion, or that, unless by plain legislative direction, discretionary licensing authority would have been granted which could be exercised in a manner which might sanction discrimination.

Duff J (Mignault and Smith JJ, concurring) believed that "There is nothing in the terms in which these provisions are expressed, nor, as far as I have been able to discover, in the terms of the regulations, pointing to a conclusion that the authority of the Minister is not a permissive one."

The federal government chose to ignore the ruling, pending appeal to the Privy Council. In the interim, prosecutions against Japanese-Canadian fishermen were being dismissed in the lower courts. The Association of Fishermen of Japanese Origin, having intervened in the hearing at the Supreme Court, were also respondents in the appeal.

== At the Privy Council ==
The Judicial Committee upheld the ruling of the Supreme Court in its entirety. Before proceeding with the appeal at hand, Lord Tomlin considered the matter of where federal and provincial jurisdiction arise under Canadian constitutional law, and gave his summary of where the jurisprudence stood at that time:

Questions of conflict between the jurisdiction of the Parliament of the Dominion and provincial jurisdiction have frequently come before the Lordships' Board and as a result of the decisions of the Board the following propositions may be stated:—

1. The legislation of the Parliament of the Dominion, so long as it strictly relates to subjects of legislation expressly enumerated in section 91, is of paramount authority, even if it trenches upon matters assigned to the Provincial Legislature by section 92.
2. The general power of legislation conferred up on the Parliament of the Dominion by section 91 of the Act in supplement of the power to legislate upon the subjects expressly enumerated must be strictly confined to such matters as are unquestionably of national interest and importance, and must not trench on any of the subjects enumerated in section 92, as within the scope of Provincial legislation, unless these matters have attained such dimensions as to affect the body politic of the Dominion.
3. It is within the competence of the Dominion Parliament to provide for matters which though otherwise within the legislative competence of the Provincial Legislature, are necessarily incidental to effective legislation by the Parliament of the Dominion upon a subject of legislation expressly enumerated in section 91.
4. There can be a domain in which Provincial and Dominion legislation may overlap, in which case, neither legislation will be ultra vires if the field is clear, but if the field is not clear and the two legislations meet, the Dominion legislation must prevail.

Tomlin then turned to the question as to where jurisdiction over fish canneries fell. In that regard,

...trade processes by which fish when caught are converted into a commodity suitable to be placed upon the market cannot upon any reasonable principle of construction be brought within the scope of the subject expressed by the words "Sea Coast and Inland Fisheries."

As such activity could not be seen to fall under any other heading of s. 91, and a licensing system could not reasonably be seen to be incidental to the federal power, it therefore fell within provincial jurisdiction.

The Association of Fishermen of Japanese Origin were awarded their costs in the appeal.

== Impact ==
The gas boat restriction and the oriental exclusion policy were abandoned for the 1930 fishing season, and discrimination in the fishing industry came to an end.

On a larger view, the Fish Canneries Reference is considered to be one of the main foundations of Canadian constitutional jurisprudence, and its four-part summary of how to determine jurisdiction was subsequently cited with approval in the Aeronautics Reference in 1931.

The question of ministerial discretionary authority, and the extent as to how far it can go, continued to be debated, eventually to be settled by the Supreme Court in Roncarelli v. Duplessis.

== See also ==
- Takahashi v. Fish and Game Commission: a similar case in California
