= Charles Holland Locke =

Justice of the Supreme Court of Canada

The Honourable Charles Holland Locke
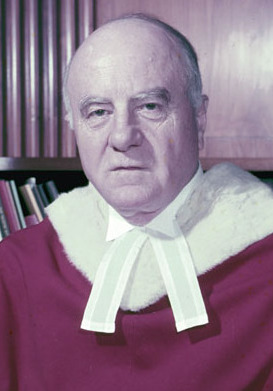
- Locke, ca. 1950s

Puisne Justice of the Supreme Court of Canada
- In office June 3, 1947 – September 16, 1962
- Nominated by: William Lyon Mackenzie King
- Preceded by: Albert Hudson
- Succeeded by: Emmett Matthew Hall

Personal details
- Born: September 16, 1887 Morden, Manitoba
- Died: May 30, 1980 (aged 92)

Charles Holland Locke, CC MC (September 16, 1887 – May 30, 1980) was a Canadian Justice of the Supreme Court of Canada.

== Early life ==
Born in Morden, Manitoba, he served articles first with a law firm in Morden, then moved to Winnipeg to finish his articles in the office of Albert Hudson, who was later appointed to the Supreme Court. Locke was called to the bar of Manitoba in 1910, but interrupted his legal practice to serve overseas with the Canadian military in First World War, being awarded the Military Cross. After the War, he returned to practise in Winnipeg, but in 1928 he moved to Vancouver, joining the bar of British Columbia. He was active in the provincial bar and the Progressive Conservative party.

== Justice of the Supreme Court of Canada ==
On June 3, 1947, Locke was appointed to the Supreme Court of Canada by Prime Minister William Lyon Mackenzie King at the age of 59, filling the vacancy created by his mentor Albert Hudson's death on January 6, 1947. Locke was the last member of the Court to have read law rather than receive legal training at a university. He was the first person born in western Canada to be appointed to the Supreme Court. King struggled to find a qualified candidate for the position, having offered the position to Sherwood Lett, and others who declined. King also considered appointing Louis St. Laurent and James Lorimer Ilsley despite not being from Western Canada.

In Noble v Alley (1950), Locke was the single dissenting justice where the Supreme Court invalidated a restrictive covenant prohibiting the sale of land based on race. Justice Locke dissented on the procedural ground that reliance on Tulk v. Moxhay by one of the parties raised a new argument on appeal that had been rejected by the Ontario Court of Appeal. (Note: Noble et al v Alley, 1950 CanLII 13, [1951] SCR 64, Supreme Court (Canada))

Locke served as Puisne Justice until September 16, 1962.

== Personal life ==
His son, Charles Conrad Locke (September 24, 1917–October 1, 2011), was a justice of both the Supreme Court of British Columbia and British Columbia Court of Appeal.

In 1971, he was made a Companion of the Order of Canada.
