= Wishart Spence =

Supreme Court of Canada judge (1904–1998)

The Honourable Wishart Flett Spence CC OBE

Puisne Justice of the Supreme Court of Canada
- In office May 30, 1963 – December 29, 1978
- Nominated by: Lester B. Pearson
- Preceded by: Robert Taschereau
- Succeeded by: William McIntyre

Personal details
- Born: March 9, 1904 Toronto, Ontario
- Died: April 16, 1998 (aged 94)

Wishart Flett Spence CC OBE (March 9, 1904 – April 16, 1998) was a puisne justice of the Supreme Court of Canada.

Born in Toronto, Ontario, the son of James Houston Spence and Margaret Hackland, Spence graduated from the University of Toronto Schools. He then received a Bachelor of Arts degree in political science from the University of Toronto in 1925, studied law at Osgoode Hall Law School, where he received the gold medal for finishing first in his class, and was called to the Ontario Bar in 1928. In 1929, Spence received his Masters of Law from Harvard Law School. Spence practised law in Toronto and was a part-time lecturer at Osgoode Hall. In 1950, he was appointed to the High Court of Justice of Ontario.

On May 30, 1963, Spence was appointed to the Supreme Court.

In 1966, he chaired the royal commission investigating the Munsinger Affair, which involved allegations that an East German spy had been sleeping with Canadian Cabinet ministers. Spence criticised the way the Diefenbaker government had handled the matter, but found no evidence of criminal wrongdoing or security breaches.

In the 1970s, Spence frequently joined with Chief Justice Bora Laskin and Justice Brian Dickson on cases involving civil liberties, often in dissent. The grouping was colloquially referred to as "LSD".

Spence retired from the Court on December 29, 1978. In 1979, he was made a Companion of the Order of Canada.

Spence died on April 16, 1998, at the age of 94.
