= Louis-Philippe Pigeon =

Supreme Court of Canada judge (1905–1986)

Louis-Philippe Pigeon CC OQ QC

Puisne Justice of the Supreme Court of Canada
- In office September 21, 1967 – February 8, 1980
- Nominated by: Lester B. Pearson
- Preceded by: John Robert Cartwright
- Succeeded by: Antonio Lamer

Personal details
- Born: February 8, 1905 Henryville, Quebec
- Died: February 23, 1986 (aged 81)
- Education: Université Laval
- Profession: Lawyer

Louis-Philippe Pigeon, CC QC (French pronunciation: [lwi filip piʒɔ̃]; February 8, 1905 – February 23, 1986) was a Canadian lawyer, academic, and puisne justice of the Supreme Court of Canada.

== Early life and education ==
Pigeon was born in Henryville, Quebec in 1905, the son of Arthur Pigeon and Maria Demers. He studied law at the Université Laval and obtained an LL.L in 1928, winning the Governor General's gold medal. Called to the Bar of Quebec the same year, he settled in Quebec City.

== Legal career ==
Pigeon began his legal career in 1928 with the firm of St-Laurent, Gagné, Devlin et Taschereau, headed by Louis St-Laurent, future Prime Minister of Canada. He practised with the firm until 1935. In 1940, he became law clerk of the Legislature of Quebec. He held that position for four years before joining the law firm of Germain, Lapointe, Thibaudeau et Roberge.

== Academic career ==
Pigeon taught civil law and constitutional law part-time at the Université Laval for fifteen years, beginning in 1938. One of his students, William Tetley, subsequently a legal academic himself, records that Pigeon was a generalist who also had deep specialist knowledge of various areas of the law. For instance, Pigeon was once asked on a moment's notice to fill in for an absent lecturer on civil procedure. He walked into the class-room and gave a masterful lecture on the issue, without any preparation time.

Tetley also gives an interesting glimpse of Professor Pigeon's conduct of his class. Pigeon was apparently famous for not allowing questions from students, preferring simply to lecture. Tetley only remembered this approach being challenged on one occasion:

It was [a] hot day and we sat packed together in rows in a small room, with the windows closed. Someone either Jean Bienvenue (later a Quebec Cabinet Minister and Judge of the Superior Court) or Philippe Casgrain (later senior partner of the giant national law firm of Fraser Milner Casgrain) or Gaby Lapointe (flamboyant and famous criminal lawyer) put his hand up to ask a question. We all drew in our collective breath at such audacity and Pigeon was also very surprised. Finally Pigeon said "oui" in his very high pitched voice and the student said "Puis-je poser une question?" ["May I ask a question?"] Pigeon reflected and said "oui" and the student said "Puis-je ouvrir la fenêtre?" ["May I open the window?"] Pigeon reflected again and said "non" and that was the end of the Prof. Pigeon's version of the Socratic method for the day.

The next day the same student raised his hand, we students were doubly astounded and Pigeon delayed, being himself quite suspicious. Eventually he said "oui" and the student asked "Puis-je réitérer ma question de hier?" ["May I repeat my question from yesterday?"] Pigeon replied "non" in his high pitched voice and that was the beginning and end of the Pigeon's Socratic method for the year and no doubt thereafter.

Tetley also records that Pigeon was instrumental in René Lévesque's failure to complete his law degree. Lévesque, at that time in third year, had been caught smoking in Pigeon's class. He refused to apologise to Pigeon, as was the requirement at the time, and left the study of law for journalism.

Over his career spanning fifty years, Pigeon was the author of numerous major publications on legal matters. Many of his writings still serve as standard legal reference works.

Pigeon's teaching notes for constitutional law are archived under the title "Cours de droit constitutionnel : Notes de cours de Mtre Louis-Ph. Pigeon," at the Bibliothèque et archives nationales du Québec. His text on statutory interpretation was a standard work on the subject, published in both French and English.

== Government advisor ==
From 1940 to 1944, Pigeon was law clerk for the Legislature of Quebec. Following the defeat of the Liberal government of Adélard Godbout in the 1944 general election, Pigeon continued to act as an informal advisor to Godbout, as recollected by Tetley:

Hudon [the Dean of Law at Laval], a Conservative and adviser to Prime Minister Duplessis, was a rival of Pigeon, who was a Liberal and the adviser to Adélard Godbout, the Liberal Leader of the Opposition. During question period in the National Assembly (then known as the Legislative Assembly), Hudon would stand behind the green curtain on the left side of the Speaker's Chair and advise Duplessis, when a particular question of the Opposition was difficult. Pigeon stood behind the same curtain on the other side and fed questions and advice to Godbout. When the question period was over, the two adversaries — Hudon and Pigeon — would walk out arm-in-arm, complaining audibly about the state of politics and politicians.

Pigeon also acted as a legal adviser to Georges-Émile Lapalme, leader of the Quebec Liberal Party, then to the Premier of Quebec, Jean Lesage, from 1960 to 1966.

== Professional organizations ==
Pigeon was active in the Jeune Barreau du Québec, becoming secretary in 1935, and president the following year. In 1936, he was both a bencher of the Barreau du Québec, and a delegate to the Conseil général du Barreau.

Pigeon was president of the Société d'études juridiques de Québec in 1947–48. From 1963 to 1967, Pigeon was the chairman of the National Council on the Administration of Justice. He served as vice-president of the Canadian Bar Association in 1965–1966, vice-president of the Uniform Law Conference of Canada in 1966–1967, and President of the Conseil national d'éthique professionnelle, also in 1966–1967.

== Supreme Court of Canada ==
On September 21, 1967, Pigeon was appointed to the Supreme Court of Canada. He served on the Court for twelve years.

Pigeon retired from the Court on February 8, 1980, his 75th birthday, when he reached the mandatory retirement age.

== Later life ==
Justice Pigeon was made a Companion of the Order of Canada in 1980, following his retirement. He was appointed an Officer of the Order nationale du Québec in 1985.

From 1980 onwards, Pigeon was a visiting professor at the Civil Law Section of the Faculty of Law at the University of Ottawa. He also acted as Director of the Graduate Studies Program in legislative drafting at the University of Ottawa.

He died on February 23, 1986, at the age of 81.

== Awards and memorials ==
- 1980 – Companion of the Order of Canada.
- 1985 – Officer of the National Order of Quebec.
- Justice Pigeon was awarded honorary doctorates from the Université Laval, University of Ottawa, and Bishop's University.
- The Quebec Ministry of Justice is located in the Édifice Louis-Philippe-Pigeon.
- The Université Laval, with the assistance of the Quebec Ministry of Justice, offers the Chaire de rédaction juridique Louis-Philippe-Pigeon.
- The Jeune Barreau de Québec offers the annual Prix Louis-Philippe-Pigeon to a member of the Jeune Barreau de Québec.

== Publications ==
- L.-P. Pigeon, Rédaction et interprétation des lois (Quebec: Queen's Printer for Quebec (Ministère des communications), 1965), ISBN 2551088208.
- L.-P. Pigeon, Drafting and Interpreting Legislation (Toronto: Carswell, 1988) ISBN 0459321617.
