= Wilfred Judson =

Canadian judge (1902–1980)

Puisne Justice of the Supreme Court of Canada
- In office February 5, 1958 – July 20, 1977
- Nominated by: John Diefenbaker
- Preceded by: Roy Kellock
- Succeeded by: Willard Estey

Personal details
- Born: July 20, 1902 Todmorden, England
- Died: June 15, 1980 (aged 77)
- Education: University of Manchester; Osgoode Hall (Law Society of Upper Canada)

Wilfred Judson, CC (July 20, 1902 – June 15, 1980) was a Canadian lawyer and Puisne Justice of the Supreme Court of Canada.

Born in Todmorden, England, the son of John and Agnes Judson, he received a BA in 1922 and an MA in 1923 from the University of Manchester. In 1923 he emigrated to Canada. He graduated from Osgoode Hall Law School and was called to the bar in 1932. After practising law for 19 years he was appointed to the High Court of Justice of Ontario in 1951 and to the Supreme Court of Canada in 1958. He retired in 1977.

In 1978, he was made a Companion of the Order of Canada.
