= Douglas Abbott =

Canadian politician and Supreme Court judge (1899–1987)

The Honourable Douglas Abbott PC
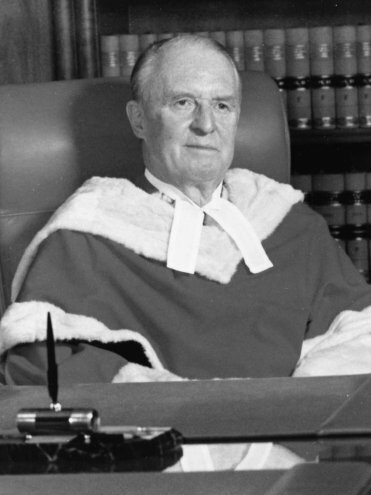

Puisne Justice of the Supreme Court of Canada
- In office July 1, 1954 – December 23, 1973
- Nominated by: Louis St. Laurent
- Preceded by: Patrick Kerwin
- Succeeded by: Louis-Philippe de Grandpré

Minister of Finance
- In office December 10, 1946 – June 30, 1954
- Prime Minister: W. L. Mackenzie King; Louis St. Laurent
- Preceded by: James Lorimer Ilsley
- Succeeded by: Walter Harris

Minister of National Defence
- In office August 21, 1945 – December 9, 1946
- Prime Minister: W. L. Mackenzie King
- Preceded by: Andrew McNaughton
- Succeeded by: Brooke Claxton

Member of Parliament for Saint-Antoine—Westmount
- In office March 26, 1940 – June 30, 1954
- Preceded by: Robert Smeaton White
- Succeeded by: George Carlyle Marler

Personal details
- Born: Douglas Charles Abbott; May 29, 1899 Lennoxville, Quebec, Canada
- Died: March 15, 1987 (aged 87) Ottawa, Ontario, Canada
- Party: Liberal
- Spouses: Mary Winnifred Chisholm (m. 1925; died 1980) Florence Elizabeth Scarth (m. 1981)
- Children: 3, including Tony
- Education: Bishop's University; McGill Law School; Université de Dijon
- Profession: Lawyer

Military service
- Branch/service: Non-Permanent Active Militia; Royal Air Force
- Years of service: 1916–1918; 1918
- Rank: Gunner (NPAM)
- Unit: 7th (McGill) Siege Battery, Canadian Garrison Artillery, Royal Regiment of Canadian Artillery

Douglas Charles Abbott PC (May 29, 1899 – March 15, 1987) was a Canadian Member of Parliament, federal Cabinet Minister, and justice of the Supreme Court of Canada. Abbott's appointment directly from the Cabinet of Canada as Finance Minister to the Supreme Court was one of the most controversial in the Supreme Court's history.

== Early life ==
Abbott was born in Lennoxville, Quebec (now Sherbrooke, Quebec). He attended Bishop's University, graduating with a Bachelor of Arts. He then attended McGill Law School, but interrupted his studies to sign up for service overseas, in 1916. Returning from the Great War, he completed his legal studies, earning his Bachelor of Civil Law. He then went to France to attend the Université de Dijon. Returning to Canada, he was called to the Barreau du Québec in 1921 and practised law in Montreal with the firm of Fleet, Phelan, Fleet & Le Mesurier. He welcomed his son, Athony Abott, into the world, on November 26, 1930.

== Political career ==
A member of the Liberal Party of Canada, Abbott successfully stood for election to the House of Commons in 1940. He remained a member of the House for fourteen years, and unlike most contemporaries did not return to military service during the Second World War. He held office as Minister of National Defence (1945–1946) and then Minister of Finance (1946–1954).

As a member of Prime Minister Louis St. Laurent's cabinet, Abbott suggested that one of Quebec's three seats on the Supreme Court of Canada to be reserved for an anglophone to provide representation to the minority in Quebec. St. Laurent rejected that view, as he understood the appointment convention as requiring at least three French-speaking members of the Court and considered Abbott's proposal a drastic change.

== Supreme Court justice ==
He was appointed to the Supreme Court of Canada on July 1, 1954 and served as puisne justice until December 23, 1973.

Abbott was appointed to the court directly from the federal Cabinet, where he had served the previous seven years as Finance Minister. The appointment is considered one of the most controversial in the history of the Supreme Court. It was the first appointment directly from Cabinet since the 1911 appointment of Louis-Philippe Brodeur. As of 2026, Abbott was the last justice of the Supreme Court of Canada appointed directly to the Court from the Cabinet, and the last justice to have held elected office prior to his appointment.

Abbott was criticized for refusing leave to appeal in Wilbert Coffin's case on the basis that it raised no substantial issue of law. Snell and Vaughan note that Abbott's involvement was unfortunate because, before the case, he had admitted to a journalist that he had limited experience in criminal law and would avoid writing criminal judgments until he gained more experience. The decision drew public criticism and caused some observers to question the quality of the Supreme Court justices more broadly. The Court later declined a motion to rehear the application for leave to appeal. Public outcry after Coffin's escape from prison led Minister of Justice Stuart Garson to take the extraordinary step of asking the Supreme Court to hear the case. In the resulting reference, the justices held 5–2 that the appeal would fail. Coffin was executed three weeks later. (Note: Reference re Regina v Coffin, 1956 CanLII 94, [1956] SCR 191, Supreme Court (Canada))

== Parliamentary seats ==
=== House of Commons ===
- 16 May 1940 – 16 April 1945: St. Antoine—Westmount, Quebec
- 6 September 1945 – 30 April 1949: St. Antoine—Westmount, Quebec
- 15 September 1949 – 13 June 1953: St. Antoine—Westmount, Quebec
- 12 November 1953 – 30 June 1954: Saint-Antoine—Westmount, Quebec

== Parliamentary functions ==
=== Ministry ===
- 18 April 1945 – 11 December 1946: Minister of National Defence for Naval Services
- 21 August 1945 – 11 December 1946: Minister of National Defence
- 10 December 1946 – 30 June 1954: Minister of Finance and Receiver General

=== Parliamentary Secretary ===
- 1 April 1943 – 7 March 1945: Parliamentary Assistant to the Minister of Finance
- 8 March 1945 – 16 April 1945: Parliamentary Assistant to the Minister of National Defence

== Archives ==
There is a Douglas Charles Abbott fonds at Library and Archives Canada. Archival reference number is R4773 (former archival reference number MG32-B6).

Parliament of Canada
Preceded by Robert Smeaton White	Member of Parliament for Saint-Antoine—Westmount; 1940–1954	Succeeded by George Carlyle Marler
