= Ronald Martland =

Supreme Court of Canada judge (1907–1997)

The Honourable Ronald Martland CC, AOE

Puisne Justice of the Supreme Court of Canada
- In office January 15, 1958 – February 10, 1982
- Nominated by: John Diefenbaker
- Preceded by: Henry Grattan Nolan
- Succeeded by: Bertha Wilson

Personal details
- Born: February 10, 1907 Liverpool, England
- Died: November 27, 1997 (aged 90) Ottawa, Ontario, Canada
- Spouse: Iris Euphemia Bury (m. 30 March 1935)
- Children: 3
- Education: University of Alberta; Hertford College, University of Oxford
- Profession: Lawyer

Ronald Martland, CC, AOE (February 10, 1907 – November 20, 1997) was a Canadian lawyer and puisne justice of the Supreme Court of Canada. He was the second Albertan appointed to the Supreme Court of Canada, taking the place of Justice Nolan, who died after only a short time on the Court.

== Family life and education ==
Ronald Martland was born in Liverpool, England, in 1907. His family immigrated to Canada in 1911, when he was four years old. He graduated from high school at the age of 14, but was too young to attend university, so he worked as a page in the Legislative Assembly of Alberta for two years.

Martland attended the University of Alberta and obtained a B.A. in 1926 and an LL.B in 1928. At law school, he led his class each year, and won the Chief Justice Harvey Gold Medal in his final year. He was awarded a Rhodes Scholarship and studied at Hertford College, Oxford University. He received an additional BA in 1930 and a BCL in 1931. He was the first Canadian recipient of the Vinerian Prize. While at Oxford, he played for the Oxford University Ice Hockey Club.

In 1935, he married Iris Euphemia Bury. They had three children.

== Career as a lawyer ==
Martland was called to the bar of Alberta in 1932 and practised law at the firm of Milner, Carr, Dafoe & Poirier for over 25 years. He became a leading counsel in the courts of the province, as well as appearing before the Supreme Court of Canada and the Judicial Committee of the Privy Council, at that time the highest court for the British Commonwealth. He was a bencher of the Law Society of Alberta between 1948 and 1958.

== Supreme Court Justice ==
Martland was appointed to the Supreme Court of Canada on January 15, 1958, on the nomination of Prime Minister John Diefenbaker. He served on the Court as Puisne Justice for 24 years, participating in over 1,700 cases. Of these, he wrote the decision for the majority in some 230 cases and concurring judgments in more than 70 cases. He wrote dissenting judgments in some 40 cases. One of his most significant dissents, co-authored with Justice Ritchie, was in the Patriation Reference, where they argued that as a matter of constitutional law, the federal Parliament did not have the authority to unilaterally request that the British Parliament enact the proposed patriation constitutional amendments. Although in dissent on the legal issue, Martland and Ritchie were in the majority on the second issue in the Reference, the existence of a constitutional convention which required a significant degree of provincial support for major constitutional amendments.

In late 1973, Chief Justice Fauteux announced his retirement from the Court. Justice Martland was the senior puisne justice, and the long-standing tradition was that the most senior judge on the bench would be appointed chief justice. (At that time, the only exceptions to this custom were in 1906 and 1924, when the senior puisne justice had been passed over.) However, Prime Minister Pierre Trudeau chose instead to appoint Bora Laskin as Chief Justice. Laskin was the second-most junior judge of the Court, and the appointment created considerable comment. It was said that Justice Martland had been given very little notice that he would be passed over, and was upset by it. The Finance Minister, John Turner, was rumoured to be furious at the departure from the traditions of the Court.

One of the most notable cases that Martland presided over was that of Irene Murdoch, a rancher who had been severely abused by her husband for years. Murdoch wanted a divorce, and, because she had helped to build the ranch over 25 years, argued that she should be given a share of the property. The Supreme Court under Martland refused to give her any part of the property, in a decision that "shocked the consciousness of Canadians" and led to widespread calls for reform.

== Retirement and death ==
Martland retired from the Court on February 10, 1982, when he reached the mandatory retirement age of 75. He died on November 20, 1997, at the age of 90.

== Membership in Anglican Church ==
Martland was an active member of the Anglican Church of Canada. While in Edmonton, he served as Chancellor (legal advisor) of the Anglican Diocese of Athabasca. While sitting on the Supreme Court, he also served as the Chancellor of the Anglican Diocese of Ottawa.

== Honours ==
Justice Martland received a number of honours:

- 1982 - Companion of the Order of Canada
- 1984 - Alberta Order of Excellence
- Honorary Professor of law at the Universities of Alberta and Calgary
- Honorary fellow of Hertford College, Oxford

== Honorary Degrees ==
Justice Martland also received Honorary Degrees from several Universities including

- University of Alberta in Edmonton, Alberta
- University of King's College in Halifax, Nova Scotia
