= Gérald Fauteux =

Chief Justice of Canada from 1970 to 1973

The Right Honourable Gérald Fauteux PC CC
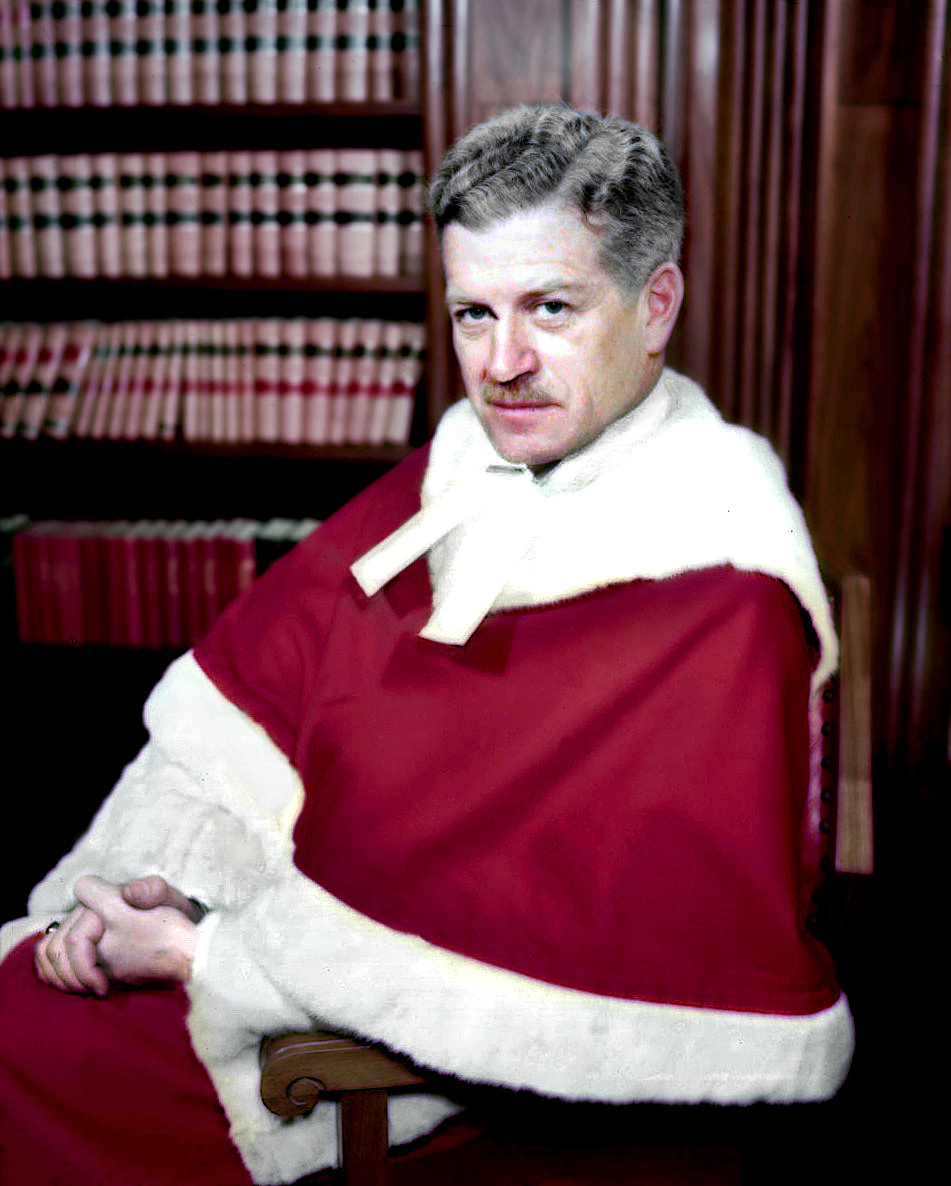
- Fauteux in 1953

13th Chief Justice of Canada
- In office March 23, 1970 – December 23, 1973
- Nominated by: Pierre Trudeau
- Appointed by: Roland Michener
- Preceded by: John Robert Cartwright
- Succeeded by: Bora Laskin

Puisne Justice of the Supreme Court of Canada
- In office December 22, 1949 – March 23, 1970
- Nominated by: Louis St. Laurent
- Preceded by: None (new position)
- Succeeded by: Bora Laskin

Chancellor of the University of Ottawa
- In office 1973–1979
- Preceded by: Pauline Vanier
- Succeeded by: Gabrielle Léger

Personal details
- Born: October 22, 1900 Saint-Hyacinthe, Quebec
- Died: September 14, 1980 (aged 79)
- Education: Université de Montréal

Joseph Honoré Gérald Fauteux PC CC (French pronunciation: [ʒeʁald fotø]; October 22, 1900 – September 14, 1980) was a Canadian jurist and lawyer who served as the 13th Chief Justice of Canada from 1970 to 1973 and previously as a puisne justice from 1949 to 1970.

Born in Saint-Hyacinthe, Quebec, the son of Homère Fauteux and Héva Mercier, he studied at the Université de Montréal and graduated with an LL.L in 1925. Called to the bar that year, he settled in Montreal, where he practised with his uncle, Honoré Mercier Jr., forming the law firm of Mercier & Fauteux. From 1930 to 1936, he was Crown Prosecutor for Montreal, and in 1939 he became Chief Crown Prosecutor of the province of Quebec.

In 1946 he was a legal adviser with the Royal Commission on Spying Activities in Canada. He taught criminal law as a sessional lecturer at McGill University for 14 years and was the dean of the Faculty of Law from 1949 to 1950. In 1947 he was appointed to the Quebec Superior Court and to the Supreme Court of Canada on December 22, 1949. He was also one of the founders of the University of Ottawa's law faculty, serving as dean from 1953 to 1962. He was appointed the Chancellor of the University of Ottawa in 1973. On March 23, 1970, he was named Chief Justice of Canada, retiring on December 23, 1973, having served for 24 years on the court, four as Chief Justice. In 1974 he was made a Companion of the Order of Canada. Fauteux Hall which houses the Faculty of Law at the University of Ottawa is named after him.

Chief Justice Fauteux died on September 14, 1980 at the age of 79.

== Family ==
His grandfather, Honoré Mercier and his uncle, Lomer Gouin, were both former Premiers of Quebec. His grandmother's second husband was Liberal Member of Parliament (MP) and later Senator Joseph Godbout. His brother was the politician Gaspard Fauteux.
