= Duff Court =

Period of the Supreme Court of Canada from 1933 to 1944

Supreme Court of Canada
Duff Court
- Anglin Court ← → Rinfret Court
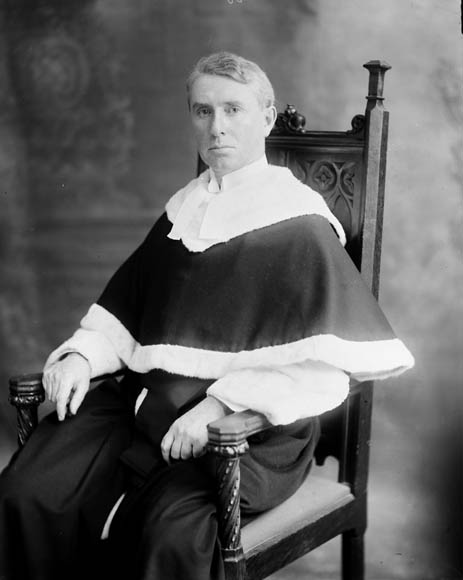
- Lyman Poore Duff
- March 17, 1933 – January 7, 1944 (10 years, 296 days)
- Seat: Second Supreme Court of Canada building
- No. of positions: 7

The Duff Court was the period in the history of the Supreme Court of Canada from 1933 to 1944, during which Lyman Poore Duff served as Chief Justice of Canada. Duff succeeded Francis Alexander Anglin as Chief Justice following Anglin's resignation, and remained in office until his own resignation on January 7, 1944.

The Duff Court, much like all iterations of the Supreme Court prior to 1949, was largely overshadowed by the Judicial Committee of the Privy Council, which served as the highest court of appeal in Canada, and whose decisions on Canadian appeals were binding on all Canadian courts. The period of the Duff Court coincided with increasing criticism of the Privy Council and a growing favourable public awareness of the Supreme Court.

The contemporary view of Chief Justice Lyman Duff was that of "Canada's greatest jurist," a characterization that later commentators have criticized for Duff's unoriginal thinking and failure to address social conditions in his decisions. During this period the Court delivered several decisions with enduring jurisprudential significance, including the articulation of an implied bill of rights in Reference Re Alberta Statutes (1938), and recognition of the constitutional status of Inuit in Reference Re Eskimos (1939).

== Membership ==
Under the Supreme Court Act, the Court was composed of seven justices, two of whom were allocated to Quebec under law, in recognition of the province's unique civil law system. (Note: The Supreme and Exchequer Court Act, S.C. 1875, c. 11 (The Supreme and Exchequer Court Act at Canadiana)) Other appointments reflected an unwritten regional balance, with two justices from Ontario, two justices from Western Canada, and one justice from the Maritimes.

Supreme Court appointments during this period also reflected an apparent religious dimension. Chief Justice Anglin had reportedly lobbied for his appointment in part to provide legitimacy for Irish-Catholics in Canada. Anglin's subsequent successors Frank Joseph Hughes, and Hughes replacement Patrick Kerwin were both Irish-Catholics.

=== Appointment of Chief Justice Duff ===
Chief Justice Francis Alexander Anglin resigned on February 28, 1933, at the age of 67 due to poor health and died three days later. On March 17, 1933, Prime Minister R.B. Bennett selected Duff as the eighth Chief Justice of Canada. There is little evidence that Bennett considered other candidates for the appointment, but Bennett was cautious about the appointment due to Duff's poor health. Duff had taken several absences from the Court over the previous years, including one for abdominal cancer surgery, and another for what was described as a "complete nervous breakdown." As a condition of the appointment, the government required Duff to sign an undated letter of resignation. His appointment was well received within the legal community.

Former prime minister William Lyon Mackenzie King had passed over Duff for Chief Justice in 1924, despite Duff's seniority over Anglin and his reputation as one of the Court's most capable jurists. Duff's close association with Robert Borden's Conservative government and rumours of alcoholism made his appointment politically untenable for King. Duff's biographer, David Ricardo Williams, argues that alcoholism was not the true reason for his exclusion. Williams instead believes Prime Minister Mackenzie King sought to strengthen Liberal support in Quebec, where Duff's role on the wartime conscription appeals board had been unpopular. Historian Ian Bushnell disputes this interpretation. Anglin himself had written to the Department of Justice opposing Duff's promotion, and the tension between the two continued throughout Anglin's tenure as chief justice.

=== Membership of the Court ===
Justices from the Anglin Court who continued into the Duff Court included Thibaudeau Rinfret of Quebec, John Henderson Lamont of Saskatchewan, Robert Smith of Ontario, Lawrence Arthur Dumoulin Cannon of Quebec, and Oswald Smith Crocket of New Brunswick.

On March 17, 1933, Prime Minister R.B. Bennett appointed Frank Joseph Hughes of Ontario to the Supreme Court at the age of 49, filling the vacancy created by the resignation of Chief Justice Anglin. Hughes was called to the bar in 1911 and established in practice in insurance law, and also served for a period as assistant Crown attorney. Snell and Vaughan describe Hughes as a capable appointment. Hughes resigned less than two years later following a heart attack and because of the effects of relocating to Ottawa on his family.

On January 31, 1935, Prime Minister Bennett appointed Henry Hague Davis of Ontario to the Court at the age of 49, filling the vacancy created by the resignation of Justice Smith on December 6, 1933. Davis was called to the bar in 1911, and practised in corporate and criminal defence. In 1933, he was appointed to the Ontario Court of Appeal where he was described as being perceptive and possessing a "discriminating mind." Snell and Vaughan note that no records exist explaining the thirteen-month delay before Smith's replacement was appointed. Smith's vacancy is the longest vacancy in the Supreme Court's history.

On July 20, 1935, Prime Minister Bennett appointed Patrick Kerwin of Ontario to the Court at the age of 45, filling the vacancy created by the resignation of Justice Hughes on February 12, 1935. Kerwin was called to the bar in 1911 and practised in Guelph with Donald and future Hugh Guthrie, who later served as Minister of Justice. Kerwin was involved in politics, and served as treasurer of the Conservative Party.

On March 24, 1936, Prime Minister William Lyon Mackenzie King appointed Albert Hudson of Manitoba to the Court at the age of 60, filling the vacancy created by the death of John Henderson Lamont on March 10, 1936. Hudson was called to the Manitoba bar in 1899 and practised in corporate and commercial law. He later entered politics as a Liberal, serving as a member of the Legislative Assembly of Manitoba and Attorney General of Manitoba. From 1921 to 1925 he served in the House of Commons as an independent, during this period he declined two offers from Mackenzie King to serve in his cabinet. Although Hudson did not actively seek appointment to the Court, he indicated that he would accept if offered the position. Contemporary reaction to the appointment was generally positive, particularly in the Prairie provinces and within Liberal circles.

On February 9, 1940, Prime Minister William Lyon Mackenzie King appointed Robert Taschereau of Quebec to the Court at the age of 43, filling the vacancy created by the death of Lawrence Arthur Dumoulin Cannon on December 25, 1939. Tascherau was the son of former Quebec Premier Louis-Alexandre Taschereau and grandson of former Supreme Court Justice Jean-Thomas Taschereau. He was appointed without previous judicial experience and taught criminal law at Laval University and civil law at the University of Ottawa prior to his appointment. Snell and Vaughan note the appointment was unexpected, and he was not the government's first choice.

On April 22, 1943, Prime Minister William Lyon Mackenzie King appointed Ivan Rand of New Brunswick to the Court at the age of 58, filling the vacancy created by the retirement of Oswald Smith Crocket. Rand read law prior to attending Harvard Law School, and served in the Legislative Assembly of New Brunswick as a Liberal. He was also New Brunswick's attorney general from 1924 to 1925. Rand had been appointed out of private practice as counsel for the Canadian National Railway in its Montreal office. Snell and Vaughan describe Rand as "one of the most outstanding legal minds" from the Maritimes.

=== Resignation of Chief Justice Duff ===
Chief justice Duff reached the mandatory retirement age of 75 in January 1940, but bi-partisan support in Parliament extended his tenure for an additional three years. (Note: An Act respecting the Chief Justice of Canada, S.C. 1939 (1st sess.), c. 14) This remains the only instance in which Parliament has waived the mandatory retirement age for a Supreme Court justice. The reasons for the extension are not entirely clear. Mackenzie King's diary refers only to wartime considerations, although Duff was widely regarded as a leading legal authority. Prime Minister King's diary also notes that he considered the Court to be weak at the time and, in discussions with Justice Minister Ernest Lapointe, concluded that there was no suitable candidate from British Columbia to replace Duff or a justice on the Court to assume the position of chief justice.

By 1943, opposition in Parliament to the extension had increased. The opposition cited both Duff's age of 78 and his role as chair of the Royal Commission on Canada's deployment to Hong Kong, which had exonerated the government of fault. (Note: An Act to amend an Act respecting the Chief Justice of Canada, S.C. 1943-44, c. 1) In private correspondence, Duff acknowledged to friends that he felt the effects of age. Duff retired as Chief Justice on January 7, 1944, after 37 years on the bench. The following day, the Court's senior justice, Thibaudeau Rinfret was appointed the ninth chief justice.

=== Timeline ===
Bar key:
King appointee Bennett appointee

== Other branches of government ==
The Duff Court began during the 17th Canadian Parliament, under a majority government led by Conservative Prime Minister R. B. Bennett.

The Court's tenure overlapped with two general elections. In 1935, the Liberal Party, led by former prime minister William Lyon Mackenzie King won a majority and formed government. In the 1940 election, King's Liberals was elected to another majority government.

== Relationship with the Judicial Committee of the Privy Council ==
From 1867 to 1949, the Judicial Committee of the Privy Council served as the highest court of appeal in Canada, and its decisions on Canadian appeals were binding on all Canadian courts. After the creation of the Supreme Court of Canada, parties could still—if both consented—appeal directly from a provincial court of appeal to the Judicial Committee, bypassing the Supreme Court. This became common practice. By 1900, the Privy Council had become dominant in Canadian jurisprudence, often deciding cases with "little or no restraint or respect" for the decisions of the Canadian courts from which the appeals originated. By the early 20th century, it was regarded as a normal part of the Canadian legal system, no longer limited to exceptional cases, a point the Committee itself stressed when urging Canadian lawyers to bring forward only cases of significance or importance.

In 1895, the Parliament of the United Kingdom amended the Judicial Committee's constituting documents to allow the queen to summon a limited number of colonial justices. In January 1918, Lyman Duff became the first pusine justice to be appointed to the Privy Council.

Growing nationalist sentiment in Canada during the 1930s increased support for abolishing appeals to the Privy Council. Legal commentators were also unsettled when the Privy Council pivot to a federalist position in the 1920s, and then back to a provincial rights position in the constitutional decisions concerning New Deal reforms in the 1930s. Critics such as Frank Scott criticized the Privy Council for being "ignorant of the Canadian environment." In 1939, Conservative Member of Parliament Charles Cahan introduced a private members bill to abolish appeals to the Privy Council. Justice Minister Ernest Lapointe referred the bill to the Supreme Court, which held by a 4–2 decision that Parliament had the authority to abolish the appeal. (Note: Reference as to the Legislative Competence of the Parliament of Canada to Enact Bill No. 9 of the Fourth Session, Eighteenth Parliament of Canada, Entitled "An Act to Amend the Supreme Court Act", 1940 CanLII 64, (1940) SCR 49, Supreme Court (Canada))

- British Coal Corp v R (1935): competency of Parliament to abolish appeals to the Privy Council. Amendments to the Criminal Code passed in 1933 abolished criminal appeals to the Privy Council after the 1888 amendments were struck down in Nadan v R (1926). (Note: An Act to amend the Criminal Code, S.C. 1932–33, c. 53, s. 17) (Note: Frank Nadan (Appeal No. 24 of 1925) v The King (Alberta) [1926] UKPC 13, [1926] AC 482, 1926 CanLII 276, P.C. (on appeal from Canada)) Lord Sankey upheld the validity of the abolishment, and emphasized the living tree doctrine. British Coal Corp was the last decision on Canadian law by Lord Sankey. (Note: British Coal Corporation and others v The King [1935] UKPC 33, [1935] AC 500, 1935 CanLII 308 (6 June 1935), P.C. (on appeal from Quebec))
- Labour Conventions Reference (1937): on the validity of federal statutes implementing minimum wage, hours of work, and days of work. A reference to the Supreme Court on the validity of the statutes tied 3–3. Lord Atkin held the statutes were ultra vires Parliament and within the exclusive jurisdiction of the provinces. Lord Atkin used the analogy of "watertight compartments" to describe the division of powers in Canadian federalism. (Note: The Attorney General of Canada v The Attorney General of Ontario and others [1937] UKPC 6, [1937] AC 326, 1937 CanLII 363 (28 January 1937), P.C. (on appeal from Canada))
- Reference Re Farmers' Creditors Arrangement Act (1937): on legislation authorizing farmers to restructure when facing insolvency. A 5–1 majority of the Supreme Court upheld the legislation under Parliament's authority over bankruptcy in section 91(21). Lord Thankerton upheld the Supreme Court's decision, noting insolvency fit within the broad notion of bankruptcy. (Note: Attorney General of British Columbia v Attorney General of Canada [1937] UKPC 10, 1937 CanLII 367 (28 January 1937), P.C. (on appeal from Canada))
- Wake-Walker v SS Colin W Ltd (1937): on inevitable accident in maritime law. Lord Sankey dismissed Frederic Wake-Walker's appeal, affirming that he had not demonstrated that the collision occurred without negligence on his part. (Note: Captain W. F. Wake-Walker O.B.E. R.N. v Steamer Colin W. Limited and others [1937] UKPC 49, (1937) 58 Ll L Rep 11, 1937 CanLII 275 (15 April 1937), P.C. (on appeal from Canada))
- Reference Re Alberta Statutes (1938): reference question on the constitutional validity of provincial laws which restricted the press, regulated banking, and prevented individuals from challenging the validity of laws in court. A unanimous Supreme Court held the statutes ultra vires. Justices Duff, Davis, and Cannon described the implied bill of rights under which certain civil liberties could not be abrogated by the government. (Note: Reference Re Alberta Statutes - The Bank Taxation Act; The Credit of Alberta Regulation Act; and the Accurate News and Information Act, 1938 CanLII 1, (1938) SCR 100 (4 March 1938), Supreme Court (Canada)) Lord Chancellor Maugham affirmed the reasons of the Supreme Court. (Note: Attorney General of Alberta v Attorney General of Canada [1938] UKPC 46, [1939] AC 117, 1938 CanLII 251 (14 July 1938), P.C. (on appeal from Canada))
- Vita Food Products Inc v Unus Shipping Co Ltd (1939): on the validity of choice of law clauses. The Supreme Court of Newfoundland held the clause invalid for non-compliance with the local Carriage of Goods by Sea Act, treating the statute as mandatory. At the JCPC, Lord Wright overturned the decision, holding that where a contract is bona fide and legal, an express choice of law will generally be respected. (Note: Vita Food Products Inc v Unus Shipping Company Limited in liquidation [1939] UKPC 7, [1939] AC 277, 1939 CanLII 269 (30 January 1939), P.C. (on appeal from Nova Scotia))
- Francis, Day & Hunter Ltd v Twentieth Century Fox Corp (1939): on copyright law. Lord Wright overturned the decision of the Supreme Court of Ontario (Appellate Division). (Note: Francis, Day & Hunter Ltd v Twentieth Century Fox Corp [1939] UKPC 68, [1940] AC 112, 1939 CanLII 276 (12 October 1939), P.C. (on appeal from Ontario))
- John E. Brownlee v Vivian MacMillan (1940): on civil seduction and conspiracy claims against the former premier of Alberta. A majority at the Supreme Court affirmed the jury's finding that Brownlee had seduced MacMillan. (Note: McMillan v Brownlee, 1937 CanLII 28, (1937) SCR 318 (1 March 1937)) The Privy Council dismissed Brownlee's appeal and endorsed the Supreme Court's reasoning on statutory interpretation. (Note: The Honourable John E. Brownlee v Vivian MacMillan [1940] UKPC 36, [1940] AC 802; 1940 CanLII 279 (4 June 1940), P.C. (on appeal from Canada))

== Rulings of the Court ==
Below is a selection of rulings of the Duff Court.

- Reference Re Companies' Creditors Arrangement Act (1934): on the validity of federal insolvency law. A unanimous Supreme Court held that federal statutes providing an alternative to liquidation for insolvent companies were valid and fell within section 91(21) of the British North America Act, 1867. (Note: Reference re constitutional validity of the Companies Creditors Arrangement Act (Dom.), 1934 CanLII 72, (1934) SCR 659, Supreme Court (Canada))
- In Re Estate of Charles Millar, Deceased (1937): on public policy and the validity of a will. The Court affirmed the will of Charles Miller which left the residue of his significant estate to the woman in Toronto who could produce the most children in the decade following his death. The Court articulated the concept of public policy and how the Court may exercise its discretion to invalidate a contract or trust that is otherwise valid. (Note: In Re Estate of Charles Millar, Deceased, 1937 CanLII 10, [1938] SCR 1; [1938] 1 DLR 65, Supreme Court (Canada))
- Christie v York (1939): on civil liability for a private restaurant that refused to serve a Black customer. In a 4–1 decision, Justice Rinfret for the majority held there was no claim due to the principle of complete freedom of commerce in the absence of a law prohibiting discrimination in service. (Note: Christie v The York Corporation, 1939 CanLII 39, (1939) SCR 139, Supreme Court (Canada))
- Reference Re Eskimos (1939): on the constitutional status of Canada's Inuit. A unanimous Supreme Court held that for the purpose of section 91(24) of the British North America Act, 1867, Inuit should be considered Indians, assigning jurisdiction to the federal government. (Note: Reference as to whether "Indians" includes in s. 91 (24) of the B.N.A. Act includes Eskimo in habitants of the Province of Quebec, 1939 CanLII 22, (1939) SCR 104, Supreme Court (Canada))
- Home Oil Distributors Ltd v British Columbia (AG) (1940): on price controls and trade and commerce authority. The unanimous Supreme Court held the provincial scheme was valid as it regulated particular businesses entirely within the province. (Note: Home Oil Distributors Ltd et al v Attorney-General of British Columbia et al, 1940 CanLII 46, (1940) SCR 444, Supreme Court (Canada))
- Provincial Secretary of Prince Edward Island v Egan (1941): validity of a provincial law suspending the licence of a person subsequent a conviction for impaired driving under the Criminal Code. The Supreme Court held the provincial law imposing a penalty following a criminal conviction was valid and did not constitute an encroachment on the federal criminal law power. (Note: Provincial Secretary of Prince Edward Island v Egan, 1941 CanLII 1, (1941) SCR 396, Supreme Court (Canada))

== Administration of the Court ==
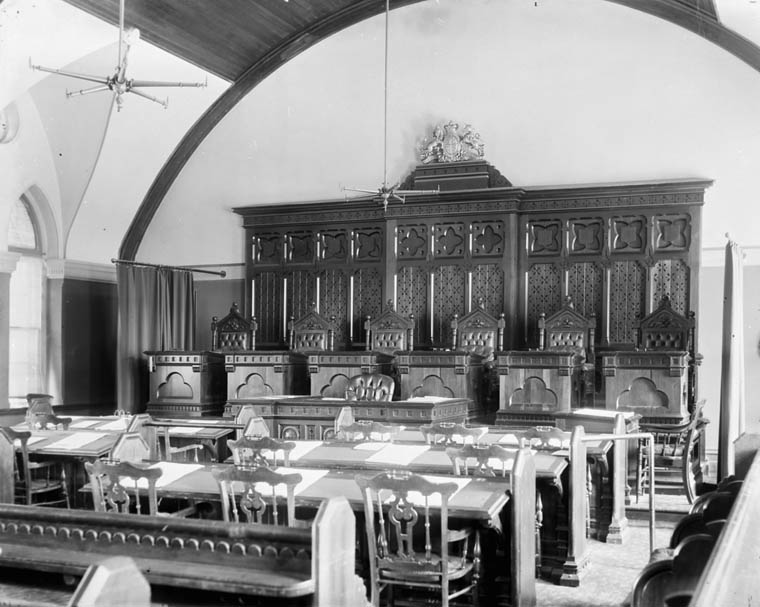
Interior of the Second Supreme Court of Canada Building showing the desks of the six justices of the Court.

The Court operated with a panel of seven judges, with a quorum of four. Under the Supreme Court Act, the Court held three sessions per year. The chief justice was authorized to appoint an ad hoc judge from the Exchequer Court or from among the provincial chief justices if the Court was unable to achieve quorum. Justices were eligible to serve until the mandatory retirement age of 75. As Chief Justice, Duff encouraged ad hoc justices to participate fully in the Court's decision-making process.

Until the completion of the Supreme Court of Canada Building in 1946, the Court did not sit at a shared bench; instead, each justice had an individual desk. Historians Snell and Vaughan note that this arrangement coincided deep divisions within the Court and a lack of "consultation and cooperation" among the justices. It was also common for each justice to write individual reasons for judgment rather than issuing joint judgments, this made it difficult to establish clear precedents or discern a coordinated judicial approach. As a result, the Court tended to resolve disputes by applying existing principles rather than developing new legal standards. In the 1920s under Chief Justice Anglin, this individualist approach began to change and more joint decisions were issued. However, if there was no initial agreement, each justice would prepare individual drafts to be exchanged among the members of the Court. Duff advocated for greater sharing of draft judgments and for regular judicial conferences, but he was unsuccessful in making these practices a consistent part of the Court's processes.

The Court recognized the right of applicants from Quebec to use either English or French. While French-language materials were accepted, they were translated into English at the Court's expense. The Supreme Court Act required the Court to publish its own decisions rather than relying on private law reporters. Judgments published in the Supreme Court Reports were printed in the language in which they were delivered and were not translated.

=== Costs and salaries of the Court ===
The cost of operating the Supreme Court steadily increased—from $54,530 in 1880 (equivalent to $1,873,577 in 2025), to $60,840 in 1890 (equivalent to $2,308,049 in 2025), $66,087 in 1900 (equivalent to $2,657,203 in 2025), to $150,000 in 1930 (equivalent to $2,706,593 in 2025).

Similarly salaries of the justices grew from $7,000 (equivalent to $240,511 in 2025), with the Chief Justice receiving an additional $1,000 in the 1880s, to $9,000 (equivalent to $301,469 in 2025), with an additional $1,000 for the chief justice in 1906; finally to $12,000 (equivalent to $172,842 in 2025), with an additional $3,000 for the chief justice in 1920. However, they remained among the lowest paid in comparison with their counterparts in other common law jurisdictions. Additionally, until 1944, the justices pensions were not transferable to their widows.

=== Growing political role of the Court ===
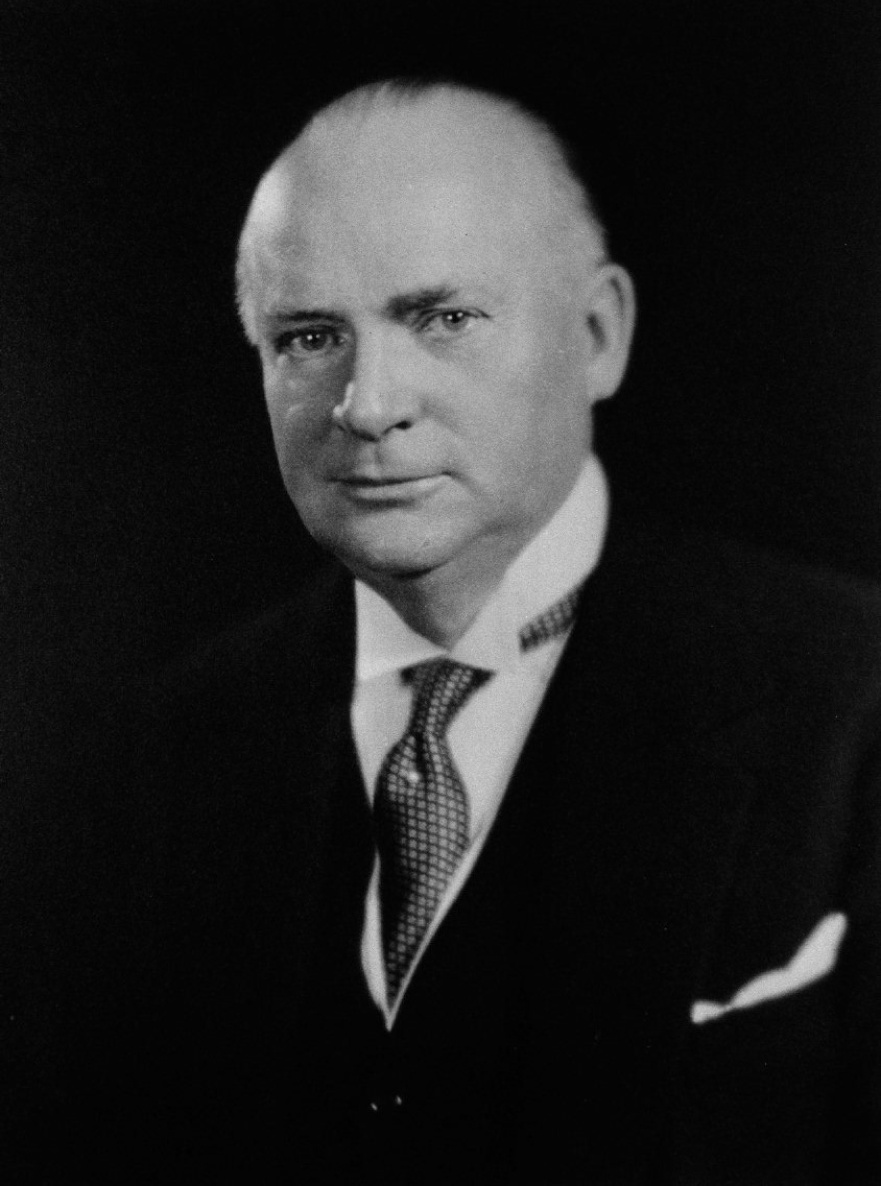
Prime Minister R.B. Bennett's "New Deal" was tested by the Supreme Court after his election loss in 1935.

Snell and Vaughan note that in the Court's early decades, close connections and political involvement between the justices and the government were common and encouraged, and were not regarded as inappropriate. By 1920, the idea among political actors that the Supreme Court could serve as a useful political instrument had become well established.

Snell and Vaughan note that Prime Minister R.B. Bennett's appointments showed significant care and thoughtfulness. Bennett continued the traditions of balancing regional and religious appointments, and there is limited evidence of political influence in appointments, besides that of Oswald Smith Crocket. When Mackenzie King returned to office, he continued the patronage-based appointment system.

After Mackenzie King's election in 1935, eight statutes enacted by the Bennett government, modeled on the "New Deal" laws of Franklin D. Roosevelt, were referred to the Supreme Court as reference questions. These references were highly political questions of public policy. Bennett attempted to insert himself into the process to defend the legislation by sending materials on the objectives of the legislation through an intermediary outside of the formal court process. In the references, the Court sat as a panel of six due to a vacancy. It upheld two statutes, struck down two, found one partially valid, and divided evenly on the remaining three.

=== Battle of Hong Hong Inquiry and Cover-up ===
In 1941, the Canadian government sent "C" Force consisting of two battalions to Hong Kong to serve as part of the garrison. The Canadian soldiers were "practically untrained", and were intended primarily as a deterrent to Japanese invasion rather than for combat. On the same morning as the attack on Pearl Harbor, forces of the Empire of Japan attacked Hong Kong. Two weeks later, the colony surrendered.

Following the fall of Hong Kong, Conservative premier of Ontario George A. Drew accused Prime Minister King's federal government of incompetence for sending inadequately trained Canadian troops to Hong Kong. Minister of Defence James Ralston acknowledged in Parliament that Canadian soldiers had not been adequately trained for a combat role. In response, King established a Royal Commission to examine the decision to deploy Canadian troops to Hong Kong. Although King considered appointing General Harry Crerar as a commissioner, he was concerned that Crerar might characterize the deployment as a political decision.

Chief Justice Lyman Duff was instead appointed commissioner and ultimately cleared the government of fault. Duff's biographer Williams notes that Duff had not conducted the inquiry in a thorough, balanced, or impartial manner. The commission and its conclusions tarnished Duff's reputation, who two years earlier had been granted a bi-partisan term extension by Parliament. The report contributed to growing opposition in Parliament to any further extension of his tenure, and he subsequently retired in January 1943.

In July 1946, Major General Christopher Maltby, the British commander during the campaign, completed a final report that contradicted Duff's conclusions. The Canadian government had the report's language toned down and delayed its publication until January 1948.

=== Expansion of duties of justices ===
Beginning in the late 1890s, Supreme Court justices increasingly accepted additional roles at the government's request, reflecting both the Court's growing stature and its deeper involvement in public affairs beyond the bench. These political and quasi-judicial roles reflected a gradual increase in respect for the Court, but also reinforced the view that the Court was a political tool rather than an institution separate from government.

In the 1930s, Justice Henry Hague Davis served as the commissioner to investigate a longshoremen labour dispute in the aftermath of the Battle of Ballantyne Pier. Justice Thibaudeau Rinfret was appointed to the Royal Commission on Dominion–Provincial Relations, but resigned due to poor health. Justice Davis was appointed to investigate the allegations of improper contracting for the manufacturing of Bren guns by the John Inglis and Company.

=== Supreme Court building ===
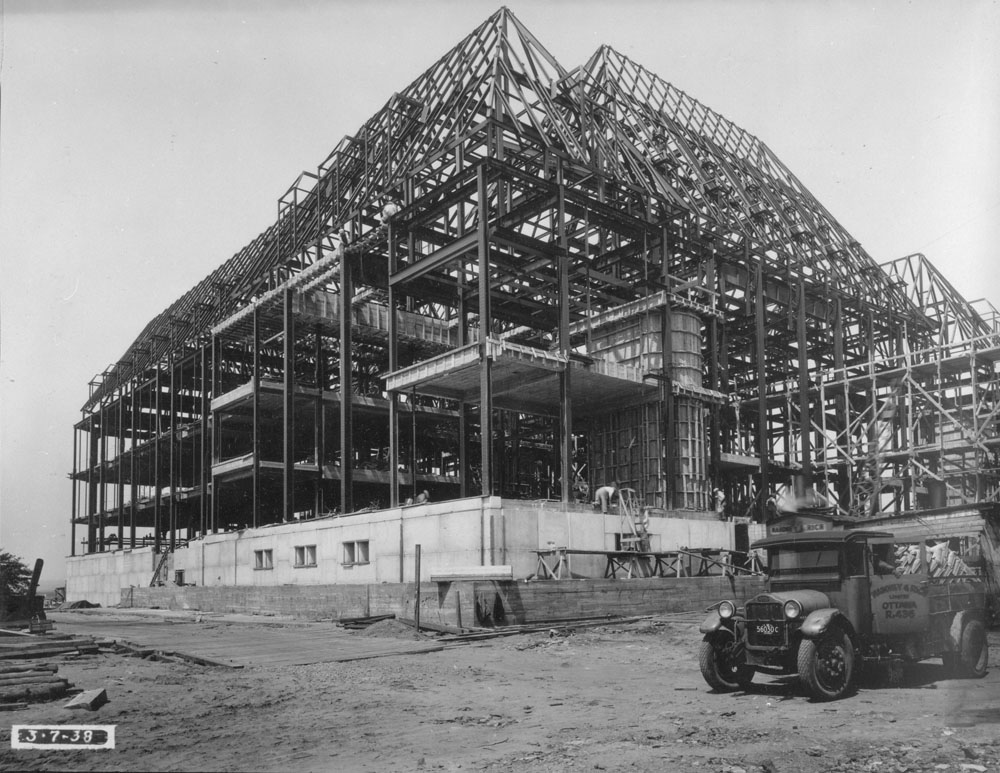
Supreme Court of Canada Building under construction in 1938.

The Supreme Court of Canada moved into its second building in 1882, a refurbished workshop and stable building. A 1936 article in Maclean's contrasted the building with the stature of the institution, noting "the shoddy little [Supreme Court] building cannot rob the institution of that peculiar reverence one automatically feels." The Court made various pleas to the government over 50 years to construct a suitable building, but these requests were largely ignored. While serving as minister of justice, both David Mills and Charles Fitzpatrick advocated for a new building without success. Minor improvements were made in 1906, including the installation of plumbing, shelving, lighting, and a one-storey extension to the Court's library. The Bennett government began examining potential sites and costs for a new building, but significant progress did not occur until Mackenzie King's return to office in 1935.

A subsequent inspection recommended that the existing building be condemned. The report identified numerous problems, including fire hazards, deteriorating structures, cramped quarters, and poor sanitary conditions. The washroom facilities were criticized; the women's washroom was described as "toilet for the women consists of one bowl placed in a dark corner underneath the stairway. It should be condemned forthwith." The justices' offices were also described as "thoroughly inadequate and injurious to the health of the occupants." Justice Minister Ernest Lapointe recommended the construction of a new building, a proposal supported by Prime Minister King and later approved by Parliament.

The initial design proposal contemplated a three-building complex to house the Privy Council, the Supreme Court, and several government commissions. Architect Ernest Cormier was selected to design the project and began consulting with the government, bar associations, the Court and Chief Justice Duff. The design was finalized and construction began in 1938, and Queen Elizabeth the Queen Mother laid the cornerstone in May 1939.

The new building was completed in 1941 but was used by government departments during the Second World War. In January 1946, the Supreme Court of Canada moved into the building.

=== Relationships of the justices ===
Chief Justice Duff had a strong relationship with Henry Hague Davis, and considered him a good friend and close collaborator. However, Duff had a poor relationship and described as having little respect for Oswald Smith Crocket.

== Legal philosophy of the Court ==
During Lyman Duff's tenure on the Court from 1906 to 1944, the Supreme Court heard more than 200 constitutional cases. In disputes concerning federalism and the distribution of powers, justices such as Duff sought to limit the scope of the federal Peace, Order, and Good Government power in order to prevent encroachment on provincial jurisdiction. However, in the "New Deal" reference cases, Duff and Davis upheld certain federal powers and considered contemporary social and economic conditions in their reasoning.

Justice Mignault's tenure on the Court began a period of new sensitivity to civil law cases. A more consistent approach to such cases emerged, shifting from earlier decisions in which the Court had applied common law principles. This approach was continued by Justice Rinfret following Mignault's retirement

Justice Cannon took a stronger view of provincial rights and maintaining provincial powers.

== Appraisal ==
The Duff Court coincided with a period of growing nationalism in Canada. The legal community became increasingly skeptical of appeals to the Privy Council while also developing greater respect for the Supreme Court as a judicial institution. The Court's decision in the Reference Re Alberta Statutes (1938), where the Court used freedom of expression as a tool to limit provincial legislative power, became a defining moment for the competency and quality of the Supreme Court in the public eyes.

In its written decisions, the Court's reasoning during this period was largely formulaic and conservative, likely because it still regarded itself as an intermediate appellate body to the Privy Council. As a result, the Court made little contribution to the development of Canadian law and issued decisions that sometimes drew ridicule from both the public and the legal community. Additionally, contemporary criticism noted the Court approached its decisions in a social vacuum and was unable to adequately consider the social conditions of Canada when interpreting the law.

== See also ==
- Supreme Court of Canada cases
