= Reference Re Farmers' Creditors Arrangement Act =

- Court: Judicial Committee of the Privy Council
- Full case name: Attorney General of British Columbia v Attorney General of Canada and others, In the Matter of a Reference as to whether the Parliament of Canada had legislative jurisdiction to enact the Farmers’ Creditors Arrangement Act, 1934, as amended by the Farmers’ Creditors Arrangement Act Amendment Act, 1935
- Decided: 28 January 1937

Case history
- Appealed from: Reference re legislative jurisdiction of Parliament of Canada to enact the Farmers' Creditors Arrangement Act, 1934, as amended by the Farmers' Creditors Arrangement Act Amendment Act, 1935, 1936 CanLII 35, [1936] SCR 384 (17 June 1936), Supreme Court (Canada)

Court membership
- Judges sitting: Lord Atkin; Lord Thankerton; Lord Macmillan; Lord Wright MR; Sir Sidney Rowlatt

Case opinions
- Decision by: Lord Thankerton

Reference Re Farmers' Creditors Arrangement Act is a decision of the Judicial Committee of the Privy Council on the constitutionality of the Farmers' Creditors Arrangement Act as part of the bankruptcy and insolvency jurisdiction of the Parliament of Canada.

== Background ==
By 1934, the farm debt problem in Canada, which had been provoked by the Great Depression, reached a scale where provincial moratory legislation (Note: as, in Ontario for example, The Mortgagors' and Purchasers' Relief Act, 1932, S.O. 1932, c. 49 , followed the following year by The Mortgagors' and Purchasers' Relief Act, 1933, S.O. 1933, c. 35) could not resolve it, as it could not remove the farmer from his position of default. The last agricultural census reported that 244,201 farms (33.61% of all farms in Canada) reported having mortgages totalling $677,000,000 (16.75% of the value of all farms, or 49% of the value of owned farms). Cash flow problems also resulted in a significant increase in the amount of short-term obligations. It reached the point where Prime Minister R.B. Bennett decided to introduce remedial legislation to address it at the federal level, based in large part on the Companies' Creditors Arrangement Act passed in the previous year.

The Act's constitutionality was attacked on two grounds, in that the Parliament of Canada lacked jurisdiction, when enacting legislation concerning bankruptcy and insolvency:

- to deprive a secured creditor of his right to realize his security fully for the recovery of the debt owing to him, where such security consists of a conventional charge upon the property of the insolvent or affecting that right by subjecting him in respect of it to the discretionary order of a tribunal.
- to frame it in such a way as to affect the rights of the government of a province as creditor of an insolvent

Accordingly, a reference question was presented to the Supreme Court of Canada, asking:

Is the Farmers’ Creditors Arrangement Act, 1934, as amended by the Farmers’ Creditors Arrangement Act Amendment Act, 1935, or any of the provisions thereof, and in what particular or particulars or to what extent, ultra vires of the Parliament of Canada?

== At the Supreme Court of Canada ==
By 5-1, the SCC held that the Act was intra vires of the Parliament of Canada.

=== Majority (Duff CJ) ===
The grounds of attack were dismissed by Duff CJ as follows:

1. L'Union St-Jacques v Bélisle, in the 1874 judgment given by Lord Selborne, construed the federal power over bankruptcy and insolvency in very wide terms, which had been affirmed in 1934 in the Reference Re Companies' Creditors Arrangement Act
2. In 1932, the Privy Council had already ruled that the Parliament of Canada could deal with the privilege attaching to debts owing to the Crown in the right of a province and to take away any priority accorded to such debts by the law of a province, to which Duff CJ declared, "The legislative authority in bankruptcy matters to deal with debts owing to a province is no less than the authority to deal with debts owing to the Dominion."

=== Dissent (Cannon J) ===
Cannon J declared that the Act could not be constitutional, as it:

1. did not provide for the rateable distribution of the assets of the debtor nor for the discharge of the debt
2. in establishing Boards of Review, did not provide for proper bankruptcy proceedings, unlike what had been set out in the Companies' Creditors Arrangement Act
3. had "nothing to do directly with agriculture, with the science, the art or the process of supplying human wants by raising the products of the soil"

However, he did hold that s. 17 of the Act (which provided for the adjustment of interest rates on certain farm mortgages) was constitutional under the federal interest power.

== At the Privy Council ==
The Board upheld the majority decision of the SCC. In so doing, Lord Thankerton found nothing wrong with the Board of Review framework, noting with approval that "it cannot be maintained that legislative provision as to compositions, by which bankruptcy is avoided, but which assumes insolvency, is not properly within the sphere of bankruptcy legislation." (Note: referring to the SCC's Reference Re Companies' Creditors Arrangement Act, at p. 660) He also rejected the contention that a secured creditor would, as a result of the composition, be deprived of his property, observing that "the reduction of the debt itself or an extension of time for its payment... is a familiar feature of compositions."

== Impact ==
Many Canadian legal commentators at the time expected that the FCAA, together with 1933's Companies' Creditors Arrangement Act, (which was effectively under collateral attack) would be declared unconstitutional as encroaching upon the provincial power over property and civil rights in relation to the rights of secured creditors, and they were astonished when both were upheld.
