= Reference Re Eskimos =

- Supreme Court of Canada

Hearing: 17 June 1938 Judgment: 5 April 1939
- Full case name: Reference whether "Indians" includes "Eskimo"
- Citations: [1939] 2 DLR 417; [1939] SCR 104
- Prior history: None (reference question)

Holding
- For the purposes of section 91(24) of the British North America Act, 1867, the Inuit are Indians.

Court membership
- Era: Duff Court; Chief Justice: Lyman Duff; Puisne Justices: Thibaudeau Rinfret, Lawrence Arthur Dumoulin Cannon, Oswald Smith Crocket, Henry Hague Davis, Patrick Kerwin, Albert Hudson

Reasons given
- Majority: Duff CJ, Hudson and Davis JJ, joined by Crocket J
- Concurrence: Cannon J, joined by Crocket J
- Concurrence: Kerwin J, joined by Cannon and Crocket JJ
- Rinfret J took no part in the consideration or decision of the case.

Reference Re Eskimos, 1939 CanLII 22, [1939] SCR 104 is a decision by the Supreme Court of Canada regarding the constitutional status of Canada's Inuit, then called "Eskimos." The case concerned section 91(24) of the Constitution Act, 1867, then the British North America Act, 1867, which assigns jurisdiction over "Indians, and Lands reserved for the Indians" to the federal government. The Supreme Court found that for the purposes of section 91(24), Inuit should be considered Indians.

== Background ==
The case arose due to controversy as to whether Inuit in Quebec were under federal or provincial jurisdiction. The Supreme Court noted that when the British North America Act was originally adopted, there were "few, if any" Inuit in Canada, which was then a much smaller country. However, the Constitution always left open the possibility of joining Canada with other lands, and thus the Inuit in Rupert's Land were now within Quebec's borders.

The federal government at the time of this case did not want to take responsibility over the Inuit. It argued that the term "Indians" as defined by the Royal Proclamation of 1763 would not include the Inuit, and that this document could be used to help interpret the British North America Act.

== Decision ==
=== Duff ===
Chief Justice Lyman P. Duff, in his opinion, consulted what he believed to be "the most authoritative" evidence, namely evidence from the Hudson's Bay Company which governed Rupert's Land. A British House of Commons committee examined how the company dealt with the Inuit in 1856 and 1857. The Hudson's Bay Company prepared a report for the committee, and as Duff noted, the report referred to Inuit as a type of "Indian." Later, after the British North America Act was adopted, the Parliament of Canada declared in December 1867 that if it gained jurisdiction over Rupert's Land, it would take responsibility for the Indians there. In 1870, the territories were awarded to Canada.

Duff then added that the Inuit of Labrador, as well, had been widely referred to as Indians from around 1760 and were when the British North America Act was adopted. Official records from 1762 called Inuit "savages", and Duff compared this to how Indian tribes such as the Montagnais and Huron were called savages. In 1869, a judge from the Court of Labrador prepared a report for the Governor of Newfoundland which referred to "Esquimaux" (Inuit) as a type of Indian. Duff also found some missionaries referred to Inuit as Indians. In this context, Duff found it important that in 1879, Prime Minister John A. Macdonald, one of the chief negotiators of the British North America Act, discussed the Inuit with Hector Langevin, and the discussion referenced the Inuit as Indians.

As defined by the Royal Proclamation of 1763, Indians are "the several nations or tribes of Indian with whom We are connected and who lived under Our protection." The federal government argued this would not include the Inuit, as the words "nations" and "tribes" were not used to describe Inuit communities. However, Duff found evidence contradicting this. Duff also said the Inuit under the Hudson's Bay Company to an extent lived under the "protection" of the Crown, "under either charter or license from the Crown." Duff also doubted that the Royal Proclamation of 1763 could guide interpretation of the British North America Act.

Justices Albert Hudson and Henry Hague Davis each wrote brief opinions concurring with Duff.

=== Cannon ===
Justice Cannon wrote his own opinion finding the Inuit should be considered Indians. He noted the report by Sir George Simpson in 1857 calling Inuit Indians. Cannon then concluded, "the report of the Committee must have been known to the Legislature at Westminster in 1867." He also pointed to the Quebec Conference of 1864, in which Resolution 29(29) of the Quebec Resolutions declaring the (Federal) Parliament should govern "Indians and Lands reserved for the Indians," in which the latter term was translated into French as "Les Sauvages et les terres réservées pour les Sauvages." This meant all natives in British North America, including Newfoundland.

=== Kerwin ===
Justice Patrick Kerwin also wrote an opinion finding that Inuit were Indians. He felt the British North America Act, in referring to Indians, was intended to mean Aboriginals. He noted evidence that Samuel de Champlain, missionaries and others classified Indians as "sauvages" and Inuit as "sauvages esquimaux." Books which Kerwin speculated that the Fathers of Confederation and the British Parliament in 1867 might have seen also used this classification. Editions of Webster's Dictionary from 1913 and the 1920s did not count the Inuit as Indians, but earlier dictionaries did.

=== Crocket ===
Justice Oswald Smith Crocket wrote an opinion briefly concurring with Justices Cannon and Kerwin.

== See also ==
- List of Supreme Court of Canada cases (Richards Court through Fauteux Court)
- The Canadian Crown and First Nations, Inuit and Métis
- Canadian Aboriginal case law
- Numbered Treaties
- Indian Act
- Section Thirty-five of the Constitution Act, 1982
- Indian Health Transfer Policy (Canada)
