= History of the Supreme Court of Canada =

The Supreme Court of Canada, established in 1875, has served as the country's final court of appeal since 1949. Its history can be divided into three broad eras. From 1875 to 1949, it functioned as an intermediate appellate court, with decisions subject to review by the Judicial Committee of the Privy Council in Britain. After 1949, the Court gained authority and legitimacy as Canada's court of last resort, expanding the judiciary's role in shaping Canadian law. In 1982, the adoption of the Canadian Charter of Rights and Freedoms transformed the Court's function, granting it enhanced powers of oversight over Parliament and entrenching civil rights, including Aboriginal and equality rights.

In July 2025, the Supreme Court announced that it will translated its pre-1970 decisions into both English and French, covering 150 years of judgments rendered by the Supreme Court of Canada.

== Origins ==
=== Pre-Confederation ===
The authority to establish a national court dated back to the creation of the Province of Canada in 1840, but the power remained unused. Proposals for such a court surfaced at several key moments: 1858, the 1864 Quebec Conference, and the 1866 London Conference; though it was never the central focus. By Confederation in 1867, the vision was for a national court of appeal to serve as the final arbiter in Canada, particularly in disputes between the provinces and Parliament.

Supporters argued that a general court of appeal would unify the laws of the common law provinces by ensuring consistency through judicial precedent, rather than relying solely on provincial legislatures. However, many in Canada West (Ontario) preferred to retain the established oversight of the Judicial Committee of the Privy Council. In Canada East (Quebec), critics worried about the cost and accessibility of appeals to London, as well as the possible threat to Quebec's unique civil law tradition and to French Canadian identity. Future Supreme Court Justice Henri-Elzéar Taschereau warned that maintaining Privy Council appeals would only prolong litigation and increase costs.

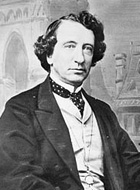
Sir John A. Macdonald, first Prime Minister of Canada and an early supporter of the Supreme Court of Canada, c. 1867

The ambivalence of the Confederation debates was reflected in the views of John A. Macdonald. As Attorney General of Canada West, he championed strong national institutions, including a supreme court, but stressed that the power to establish the court was merely permissive for the newly formed Parliament and should only come after "full consideration." George-Étienne Cartier agreed, describing the court as a matter for the future and envisioning it as a national body of skilled jurists representing each of the provinces.

=== Confederation ===
When the British North America Act, 1867, was finalized, section 101 provided Parliament the option ("may") to create a general court of appeal, rather than requiring it ("shall"):

101. The Parliament of Canada may, notwithstanding anything in this Act, from Time to Time provide for the Constitution, Maintenance, and Organization of a General Court of Appeal for Canada, and for the Establishment of any additional Courts for the better Administration of the Laws of Canada. (Note: Constitution Act, 1867, s 101.)

After Confederation in 1867, momentum grew for the creation of a final court of appeal for the new Dominion, though unresolved political tensions delayed its establishment for eight years. Leaders such as Télésphore Fournier, Alexander Mackenzie, and Edward Blake actively promoted the idea of a supreme court.

Debates over its role reflected competing visions. Some argued that a Canadian court of appeal would be redundant given the existing right of appeal to the Judicial Committee of the Privy Council, which raised the broader question of whether Canada should abolish Privy Council appeals entirely. Others expressed concern about whether a national court could adequately protect Quebec's distinct civil law tradition and culture.

In 1868, Macdonald confidentially tasked his friend, jurist Samuel Henry Strong, to draft legislation for a supreme court. Strong, working independently, submitted a first draft of the legislation to Parliament in 1869 without consulting other lawmakers. (Note: Bill 80: An Act to Establish a Supreme Court for the Dominion of Canada, 2nd Session, 1st Parliament, 1869.) Strong's 1869 bill, modeled after the Supreme Court of the United States, proposed a bench of seven judges, including a chief justice, with a quorum of four. The bill envisioned a "general court of appeal" with jurisdiction over provincial and federal law, but Macdonald introduced it mainly as a discussion document and soon withdrew it. Macdonald introduced a second bill in 1870, (Note: Bill 48: An Act to establish a Supreme Court for Canada, 3rd Session, 1st Parliament, 1870.) it offered concessions such as jurisdictional limits and monetary thresholds for appeals. Yet it too failed, because of unresolved issues surrounding judicial parity, provincial representation, and the court's overall role ultimately led to its withdrawal as well. For instance, the federal government retained the power to refer provincial acts or bills to the new court to make a determination of validity, but did not have the same power for acts of Parliament, demonstrating Macdonald's intent to use the court as a check on the provinces, rather than on the federal government.

The October 1873 Speech from the Throne promised another attempt, but Macdonald's government collapsed the following month in the wake of the Pacific Scandal.

Meanwhile, opposition from Quebec softened due to a judicial crisis in the province and the Guibord case. In Guibord (1873), the Privy Council overturned the Quebec Court of Appeal and held that Joseph Guibord's widow could compel the Catholic Church to allow her husband's burial in consecrated ground at the Notre Dame des Neiges Cemetery in Montreal. The case demonstrated that Privy Council rulings might not always fully appreciate the nuances of Quebecois religious culture.

At the same time, confidence in Quebec's judiciary had been weakened. The Bar of Quebec passed a resolution denouncing the province's highest court as "inefficient, unsatisfactory and destructive" to public confidence. The scandal prompted one judge to resign and two others to take a leave of absence that left the court unable to function without a quorum. In June 1874, Chief Justice Jean-François-Joseph Duval resigned, ending the crisis.

=== Establishment of the Court by the Mackenzie Government ===
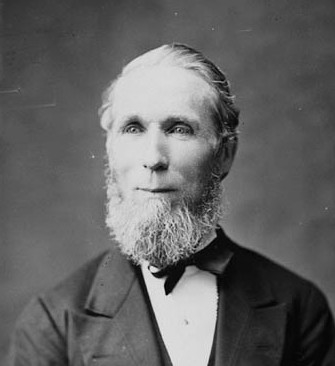
Alexander Mackenzie, second Prime Minister of Canada, who oversaw the creation of the Supreme Court in 1875

During the 1874 federal election, Alexander Mackenzie's Liberals included the creation of a central court of appeal as part of their campaign platform. Upon taking power, the Mackenzie government reiterated this commitment in the throne speech of 1874. Minister of Justice Télésphore Fournier introduced a new Supreme Court Bill to Parliament in February 1875. On April 8, 1875, with bipartisan support, Parliament passed The Supreme and Exchequer Court Act, (Note: The Supreme and Exchequer Court Act, S.C. 1875, c. 11 (The Supreme and Exchequer Court Act at Canadiana)) simultaneously establishing both the Supreme Court and the Exchequer Court. After Edward Blake succeeded Fournier as justice minister, he personally staked his political reputation on the Act's successful implementation, as he saw significant personal consequences if he failed to execute it as written.

The British Colonial Office considered disallowing the newly passed legislation due to the inclusion of Section 47 abolishing appeals to any British appeals court (including the Privy Council) as a right, although it preserved the sovereign's right to grant special leave. Governor General Lord Dufferin granted assent on April 8 after Mackenzie reached an informal agreement with Secretary of State for the Colonies Lord Carnarvon. The agreement stipulated that the act would be proclaimed into force and Parliament would later modify Section 47 if the British government deemed it beyond the Canadian government's authority. (Note: Various sections of the Act were proclaimed at different times. The initial proclamation of portions of the Act took place on April 8, 1875. On September 17, 1875, portions of the Act related to appointment of judges, registrar and other court employees was proclaimed. The judicial functions of the court were proclaimed into force on January 11, 1876.) To the surprise of the British, the Canadian government moved quickly to implement the Act and establish the Supreme Court by rapidly appointed judges to the new court. By doing so, Blake hoped to make disallowance politically unpalatable, as the Liberal government grew resentful of what they perceived as interference from the British government. The structure of the Act itself made this possible as it was designed to be implemented in phases, and Blake generated internal pressure by asserting that numerous important cases awaited the new court's attention.

Section 47 became a major point of contention between the Canadian government, led by Attorney General Edward Blake, and the British government. Lord Chancellor Cairns and colonial secretary Lord Carnarvon sought to maintain appeals to the Privy Council, proposing language from Macdonald's 1870 bill, which Blake rejected. Section 47 became a symbol of undermining unity within the British Empire, and an appeal to the Privy Council represented an important tie between Canada and the Empire. Legal arguments supporting the appeal included the claim that it potentially constituted a prerogative power that the Parliament of Canada could not abolish, the right of all British subjects to petition the Privy Council, the maintenance of uniformity in English law, the provision of an impartial arbiter for questions concerning the federal division of powers, and the protection of minority rights in Canada. Despite British efforts, section 47 remained in place. In the first appeal to the Privy Council from the Supreme Court in 1877, Lord Chancellor Cairns wrote the decision to reject the appeal, yet interpreted the Privy Council's right to hear appeals much broader than the language of extraordinary prerogative power that was originally drafted. (Note: Johnstone v The Minister & Trustees of St. Andrews Church, Montreal, 1877 CanLII 22 (SCC), 1 SCR 235; leave to appeal refused (1877), 3 App. Cas. 159.) Section 47 and the Supreme Court Act became symbols of Canadian nationalism for Blake and the Liberals but also became intertwined with Macdonald's advocacy for the "British connection", a theme he would use in his eventual comeback in the 1878 election.

=== Initial composition of the Court ===
At the outset, the Supreme Court was to be staffed by six justices. In addition, each of the six justices also sat individually as judges of the newly created Exchequer Court. This arrangement did not change until 1887 when the judges of the two courts were separated by legislative amendment. (Note: The Exchequer Court Act, SC 1887, c 16.) The selection of the initial members of the Court reflected a desire to establish legitimacy to the public and achieve regional representation across Canada. The Supreme Court Act, 1875 also allocated two of the six positions to Quebec in recognition of the unique civil law system employed by the province. (Note: Reference Re Supreme Court Act, ss 5 and 6, 2014 SCC 21, Supreme Court (Canada)) Of the seats not reserved for Quebec, Mackenzie would appoint two justices from Ontario, and two from outside central Canada.

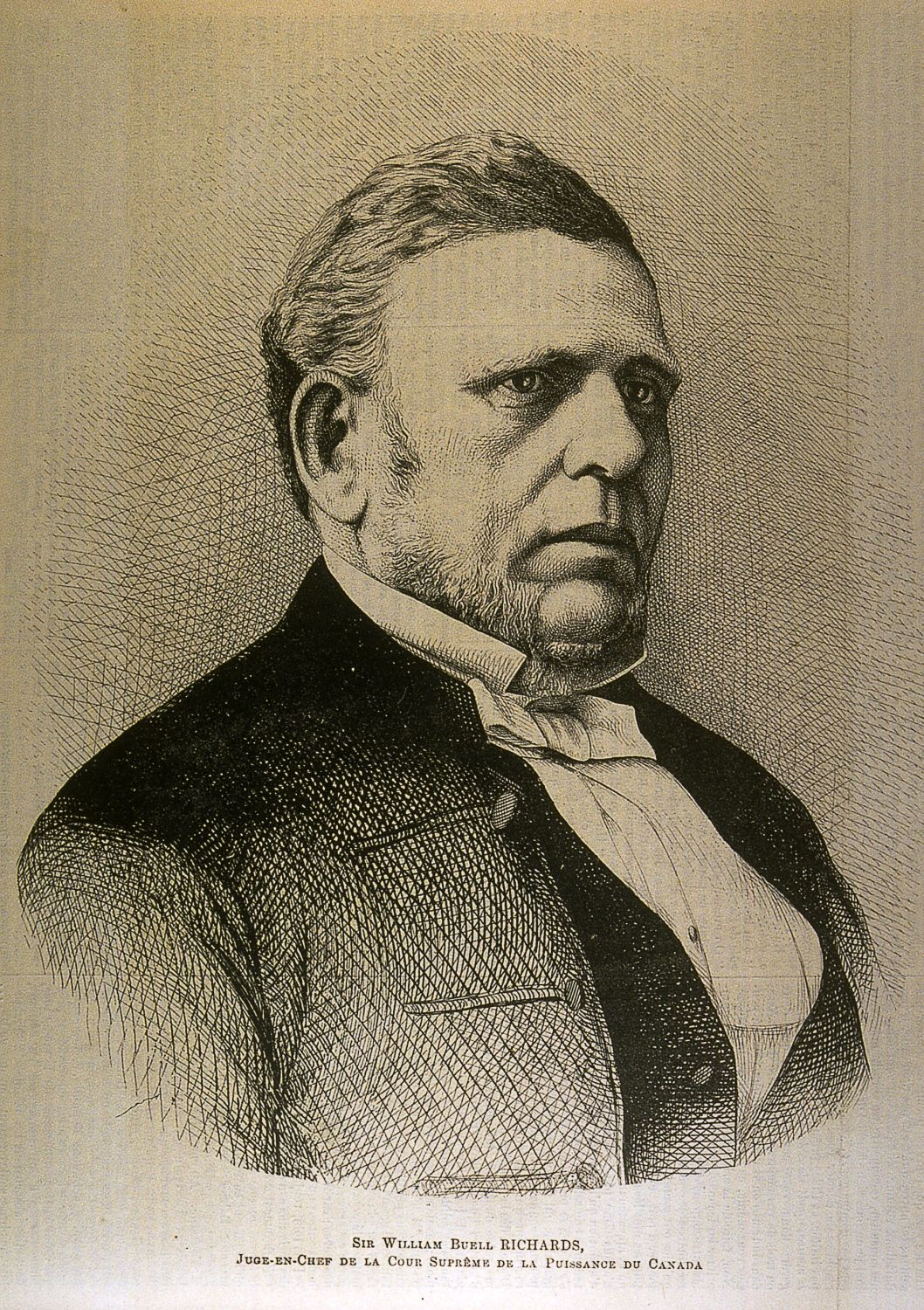
William Buell Richards, first Chief Justice of Canada

To recognize the importance of Ontario in the Confederation and to compensate for its acceptance of the same number of seats as Quebec in the newly formed Court, there was pressure to appoint an Ontarian as the Chief Justice. The position was first offered to Edward Blake, a renowned Ontario lawyer and Liberal politician. However, he declined the offer and instead accepted a post in government as the Minister of Justice. William Buell Richards, the chief justice of Ontario and formerly the attorney-general of Canada West, was ultimately appointed as Chief Justice. Samuel Henry Strong, who helped draft the 1869 proposal and was a judge on the Ontario Supreme Court, filled the other seat for Ontario. The Quebec positions were filled by Télésphore Fournier, the Minister of Justice who introduced the Supreme and Exchequer Court Act, 1875, and Jean-Thomas Taschereau, a judge of the Quebec Court of Queen's Bench. The remaining two seats went to William Johnston Ritchie, chief justice of New Brunswick, and William Alexander Henry, a former Nova Scotia MLA who lost his seat for his role as a Father of Confederation. The Mackenzie government had strained relationship with Western Canada and there was no evidence that serious consideration was given to a judge from British Columbia or the North-west Territories. The average age of the first six members of the Court was fifty-seven years (or 59 CHECK), which would in fact be one of the youngest benches in the history of the Court. On October 8, 1875, the General William O'Grady Haly administered the oath of office to Chief Justice Richards, and on November 8, the five puisne justices received their oaths of office.

Public reaction to the appointments were mixed, especially in Montréal, where the press raised concerns about the structure of the Court and the lack of commercial experience of the civil law jurists (both of whom were from the Quebec City area, leaving Montréal, then the largest city in Canada, unrepresented).

The six member structure of the Court inevitably resulted in several even split decisions, and it was eventually increased to seven in 1927. In 1949, with the abolition of appeals to the Judicial Committee of the Privy Council, the complement of judges was increased again to nine.

=== Location of the Court ===
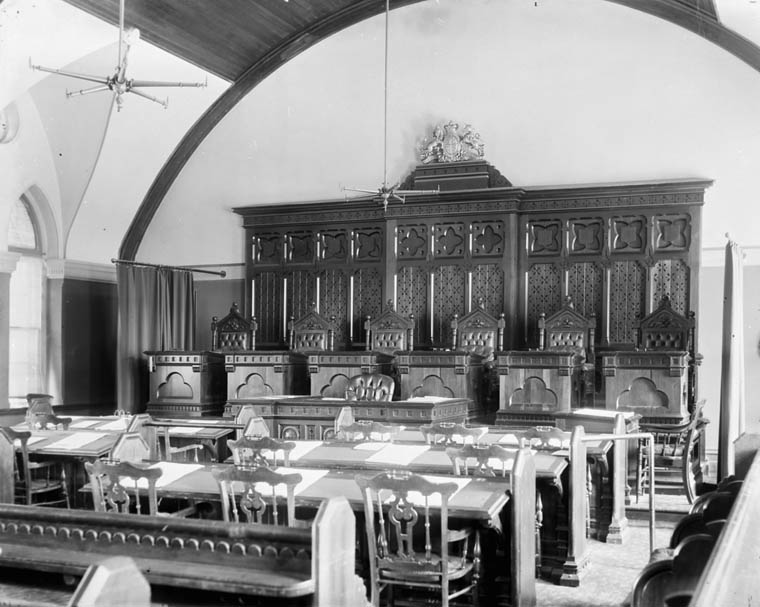
Interior of Supreme Court courtroom

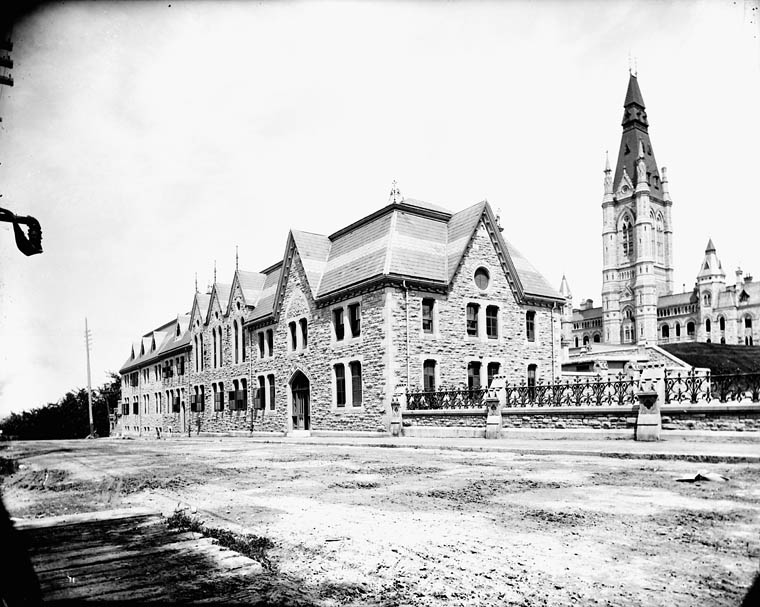
Old Supreme Court building on southwest corner of West Block

For its first five years of existence, the Court moved around among various vacant rooms in the Parliament buildings, including most notably the Railway Committee Room.

In 1882, the Court moved into permanent accommodations in the refurbished building on the southwest corner of the West Block of Parliament Hill (facing Bank Street). The building was originally designed by Thomas Seaton Scott, Chief Dominion Architect, and was constructed in 1873 as workshops and stables for the government. It was renovated with a design by Thomas Fuller in 1881 for the Supreme Court, which shared the building for six years with the National Art Gallery from 1882 until 1887. However, complaints were lodged against the building by its occupants, listing problems such as a pervasive "dreadful smell", poor ventilation, small space, lack of offices, and distance to the parliamentary library. In 1890, a new wing extending North of the building was constructed providing a basement, two additional storeys, and an attic, which nearly doubled the size of the courthouse facilities. The expansion cost $30,457 which was more than three times the initial budget. This expansion was against the wishes of Chief Justice Ritchie, who sought a new suitable building rather than expanding the building that did not fit the Court's needs. However, the Minister of Public Works Hector-Louis Langevin was an opponent of a new building, which may have owed to the Court overturning his election victory in 1877. The Court occupied this building until 1949, when they moved into a purpose-built building on Wellington Street, west of Parliament.

The early court did not sit together at a traditional bench, but instead each of the six justices had individual desks. Historians Snell and Vaughan note that this structure overlapped the period in the 1880s where the Court was highly fractured and had a lack of "consultation and cooperation".

== Under the Privy Council (1875–1949) ==
In the early days all cases could be appealed from the Supreme Court of Canada to the Judicial Committee of the Privy Council in London. As well, cases could bypass the Supreme Court and go directly to London from the provincial courts of appeal. The decisions of the Supreme Court on the interpretation of the Constitution tended to support the popular view that it was intended to create a powerful central government. The Privy Council, however, held a distinctly opposite view of the Constitution as providing for strong provincial powers. The decisions of Lords Haldane and Watson strongly reflected this view in their decisions which became increasingly unpopular. In many of their decisions they interpreted the Trade and Commerce power as well as the peace, order and good government power of the federal government to be exceptionally limited. Many of these decisions had the result of striking down a number of reforms proposed by both the Conservative Government of R. B. Bennett and the following Liberal government of William Lyon Mackenzie King, despite public support. Consequently, provincial governments began to demand the federal government press the United Kingdom for judicial independence. The Supreme Court of Canada formally became the court of last resort for criminal appeals in 1933 and for all other appeals in 1949. The last Canadian case heard by the Privy Council was in 1959, as the case had been grandfathered.

=== Richards court (1875–1879) ===
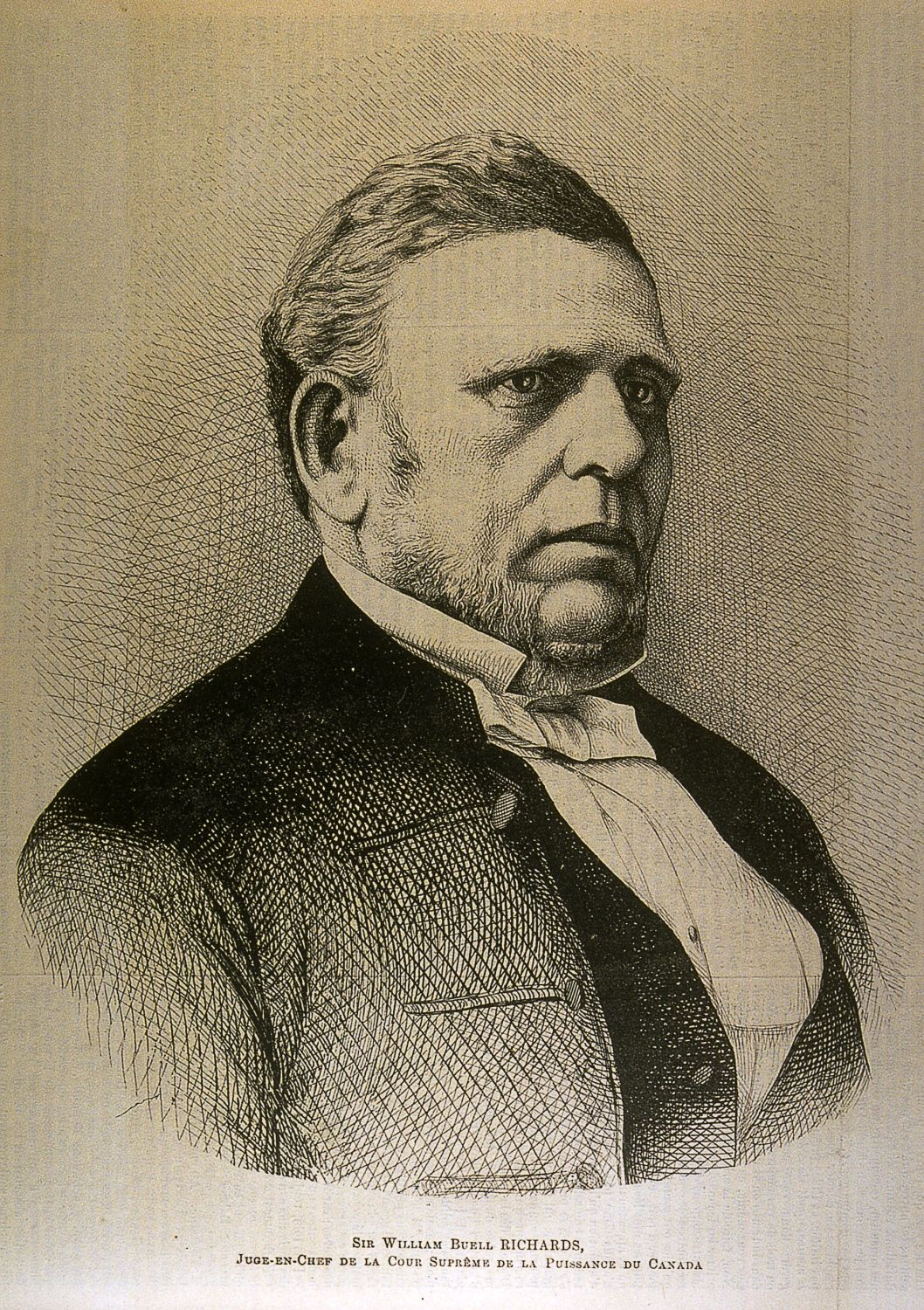
William Buell Richards was appointed the first Chief Justice of the Supreme Court of Canada.

In the Supreme Court's first year there were only a small number of appeals. When the Court convened for the first time on Monday, January 17, 1876, the sitting was immediately adjourned as there was no cases to hear. The Court operated with a panel of six judges, meaning that if there was an equal division (3—3), the appeal would be dismissed. It was also common for each justice to draft their own reasons for judgement rather than preparing joint reasons. This practice, along with the dismissal of cases due to tied votes, made it difficult to establish clear legal precedents or determine if there was a coordinated judicial approach. As a result, the Court primarily resolved disputes based on existing legal principles rather than setting new legal standards.

In April 1876, the Court heard its first case, a reference question from the Senate of Canada on whether the private bill "An Act to incorporate the Brothers of the Christian Schools in Canada" fell within the federal government's legislative authority. The Court sat a panel of four Justices. Without providing written reasons, Justices Ritchie, Strong, and Fournier held, that the bill fell under exclusive provincial jurisdiction. Chief Justice Richards did not answer whether the Court had jurisdiction to hear a reference question related to a private member's bills. It was not until June 1876 that the Court heard its first case, Kelly v Sulivan, which was filed as case number one. (Note: Kelly v Sulivan, 1877 CanLII 31, (1877) 1 SCR 3, Supreme Court (Canada)) In Kelly, the Prince Edward Island Legislature had enacted a law requiring the compulsory purchase of land owned by absentee landlords that was not being used. The Supreme Court allowed the province's scheme to continue to operate, overturning the decision of the Supreme Court of Prince Edward Island.

== Independence as court of last resort (1949–1982) ==
=== Laskin Court ===
The appointment of Bora Laskin as Chief Justice in 1973 represented a major turning point for the Supreme Court. Many of the Laskin Court justices were either academics or well-respected practitioners, most had several years experience in appellate courts. Laskin's federalist and liberal views were an influence in many of the court's decisions. The change in direction of the court proved somewhat controversial. Laskin's style was abrasive enough that it provoked Justice Louis-Philippe de Grandpré to take early retirement. His promotion to Chief Justice also upset Ronald Martland, who by convention expected to be appointed to the position since he was the most senior puisne justice at the time.

Among the most notable cases to go through the court in this period included Calder v British Columbia (AG) [1973] SCR 313 where the court acknowledged the existence of a free-standing aboriginal right to land. In R v Sault Ste-Marie (City of) [1978] 2 SCR 1299, the court established the standard for strict liability offences in the criminal law. Reference re a Resolution to amend the Constitution [1981] 1 SCR 753 ("Patriation Reference") was one of the first times the court acknowledged the existence of an unwritten constitutional convention, namely the constitutional obligation to get consent from the provinces for an amendment.

== Charter era (1982–present) ==
=== Dickson Court ===
The beginning of the Dickson Court corresponds to the first of the Charter cases heard by the Supreme Court.

The Dickson Court oversaw some of the most fundamental changes in Canadian jurisprudence. The court decided many foundational cases for Charter jurisprudence, including R v Oakes (section 1) and Retail, Wholesale and Department Store Union, Local 580 v Dolphin Delivery Ltd (scope of the Charter). Among the most radical decisions of this period include Re BC Motor Vehicle Act, which broke away from the conventional wisdom that due process only protected procedural rights by including substantive rights as well. This case was later followed up with the decision of R v Morgentaler, which proved significant both because it struck down the criminalization of abortion but also because of its expansion of due process rights into the civil context.

The Dickson Court era also saw the beginning of a major shift in Canadian administrative law, with the "pragmatic and functional approach" appearing in Union des Employes de Service, Local 298 v Bibeault.

The last years of the Dickson Court saw an entire revision of the area of conflict of laws by Justice Gérard La Forest in the decisions of Morguard Investments Ltd v De Savoye [1990] 3 SCR 1077. This would continue in the Lamer Court era with subsequent decisions such as Hunt v T&N plc, [1993] 4 SCR 289 and Tolofson v Jensen, [1994] 3 SCR 1022.

=== Lamer Court ===
Antonio Lamer's criminal law background proved an influence on the number of criminal cases heard by the court during his time as Chief Justice.

=== McLachlin Court ===
The appointment of Beverly McLachlin as Chief Justice resulted in a more centrist and unified court. Dissenting and concurring reasons were fewer than during the Dickson and Lamer Courts. The McLachlin court also saw some of the lowest numbers of decisions released in a year. In 2006, only 59 judgments were released, the smallest number in 25 years.

== See also ==
- History of Canada
