= Home Oil Distributors Ltd v British Columbia (AG) =

Judgement of the Supreme Court of Canada

- Supreme Court of Canada

Hearing: October. 3, 4, 5, 6, 10, 11, 1939 Judgment: April 23, 1940
- Full case name: Home Oil Distributors Ltd. et al. v. Attorney-General of British Columbia et al.
- Citations: 1940 CanLII 46 (SCC), [1940] SCR 444

Court membership
- Era: Duff Court; Chief Justice: Lyman Duff; Puisne Justices: Thibaudeau Rinfret, Oswald Smith Crocket, Henry Hague Davis, Patrick Kerwin, Albert Hudson

Reasons given

Home Oil Distributors Ltd v British Columbia (AG) [1940] S.C.R. 444 was a leading constitutional decision of the Supreme Court of Canada on the Trade and Commerce power under section 91(2) of the Constitution Act, 1867. The Court struck down the federal Coal and Petroleum Products Control Board Act, which protected the provincial market from rising gas prices, as it did not sufficiently conform to the "inter-provincial branch" of the Trade and Commerce power. The Court found that where regulation over transactions that take place entirely within a province, even when the product has been imported, does not fall within the Trade and Commerce power and instead is a matter in the exclusive jurisdiction of the provincial government.

== See also ==
- List of Supreme Court of Canada cases (Richards Court through Fauteux Court)
