= Quebec Veto Reference =

Judgement of the Supreme Court of Canada

Quebec Veto Reference (officially, Reference: Objection by Quebec to a Resolution to amend the Constitution) [1982] 2 S.C.R. 793 is a Supreme Court of Canada opinion on whether there is a constitutional convention giving the province of Quebec a veto over amendments to the Constitution of Canada. The issue arose during patriation debates, after the Supreme Court ruled in the Patriation Reference that there is a constitutional convention requiring "a substantial degree of provincial consent" for amendments to the Constitution of Canada.

In November 1981, the Government of Quebec ordered that a reference be taken in the Quebec Court of Appeal, asking whether the consent of the Province of Quebec is required, by constitutional convention, for constitutional amendments affecting the legislative competence of the Quebec legislature, or the status or role of Quebec's government or legislature.

On April 7, 1982, the Quebec Court of Appeal answered in the negative. By that time, the Canada Act 1982 had already been passed by the UK Parliament, though not proclaimed in force. On April 13 the Attorney General of Quebec appealed to the Supreme Court of Canada, but on April 17 the Canada Act 1982 was proclaimed in force by the Queen.

In June 1982 the Supreme Court heard the appeal. On December 6 the court rendered judgement, upholding the opinion of the Quebec Court of Appeal that Quebec did not have a veto by constitutional convention.

== General references ==
- Russell, Peter H. (2011). "The Patriation and Quebec Veto References: The Supreme Court Wrestles with the Political Part of the Constitution". Supreme Court Law Review. Ottawa: LexisNexis Canada Inc.: 75–76. ISSN 0228-0108.
