= Lucien Cannon =

Canadian lawyer and politician

The Hon. Lucien Cannon
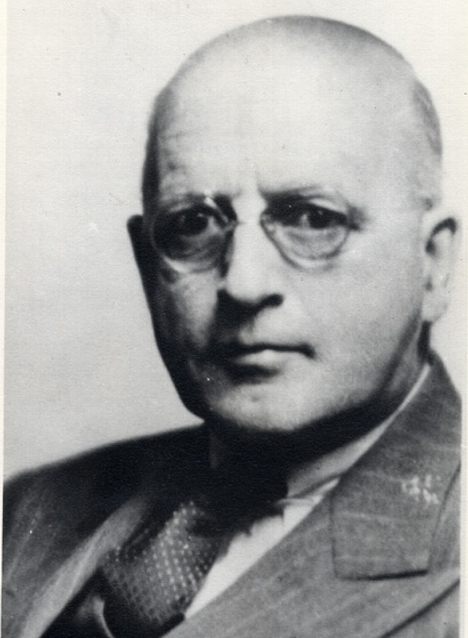

Member of Legislative Assembly of Quebec for Dorchester
- In office 1913–1917
- Preceded by: Alfred Morisset
- Succeeded by: Joseph-Charles-Ernest Ouellet

Member of the Canadian Parliament for Dorchester
- In office 1917–1930
- Preceded by: Pierre Sévigny
- Succeeded by: Onésime Gagnon

Member of the Canadian Parliament for Portneuf
- In office 1935–1936
- Preceded by: Jules Desrochers
- Succeeded by: Pierre Gauthier

Personal details
- Born: January 16, 1887 Arthabaska, Quebec, Canada
- Died: February 14, 1950 (aged 63) Quebec City, Quebec, Canada
- Party: Liberal
- Relations: Lawrence Cannon, brother Charles Cannon, nephew Lawrence Cannon, grandson
- Cabinet: Solicitor General of Canada (1925–1926 & 1926–1930)

Lucien Cannon, PC (January 16, 1887 – February 14, 1950) was a Canadian lawyer and politician.

Born in Arthabaska, Quebec, the son of Lawrence John Cannon and Aurélie Dumoulin, he studied law at the Laval University and was called to the Quebec Bar in 1910. His brother was Lawrence Arthur Dumoulin Cannon, a puisne judge of the Supreme Court of Canada. His nephew, Charles-Arthur Dumoulin Cannon, and grandson, Lawrence Cannon, were also MPs.

In 1911 federal election, he ran as a Liberal candidate for the House of Commons of Canada in the riding of Charlevoix losing to Joseph David Rodolphe Forget. In a 1913 by-election, he was elected to the Legislative Assembly of Quebec in the riding of Dorchester. A Liberal, he was re-elected in 1916. He resigned in 1917 to run again for the Canadian House of Commons in the riding of Dorchester in a by-election. He was defeated, but was elected in the 1917 federal election. He was re-elected in 1921, 1925, and 1926. From 1925 to 1926 and again from 1926 to 1930, he was the Solicitor General of Canada. He was defeated in the 1930 federal election but was re-elected in the 1935 election for the riding of Portneuf. He resigned in 1936 when he was appointed a judge.

== Electoral record ==
1935 Canadian federal election: Portneuf
Party	Candidate	Votes	%	±%
Liberal	Lucien Cannon	5,981	38.6	-13.2
Conservative	J.-Achille Joli-Coeur	5,155	33.3	-14.9
Independent Liberal	Bona Dussault	4,281	27.7	
Independent Liberal	C.-Lucien Plamondon	64	0.4	
Total valid votes		15,481	100.0	
