= Supreme Court Act =

Canadian law

Parliament of Canada
- Long title: An Act respecting the Supreme Court of Canada
- Citation: R.S.C., 1985, c. S-26
- Status: Current legislation

The Supreme Court Act (French: Loi sur la Cour suprême) is an Act passed by the Parliament of Canada which established the Supreme Court of Canada. It was originally passed in 1875 as the Supreme and Exchequer Courts Act. However, at the time, the Supreme Court was not the supreme authority on Canadian law, as Supreme Court cases could still be appealed to the Judicial Committee of the Privy Council. (Note: Appeals to the Judicial Committee of the Privy Council in criminal cases were abolished in 1933 through amendment of the Criminal Code. The Supreme Court Act was amended in 1949 to abolished appeals in civil cases. (Note: An Act to Amend the Criminal Code, S.C. 1932–33, c. 53, s. 17) (Note: An Act to Amend the Supreme Court Act, S.C. 1949, c. 37, s. 3) (Note that cases that had begun before the relevant amendment retained the possibility to appeal.))

The Supreme Court Act is not a part of the Constitution of Canada but rather was merely within Parliament's ability to pass by virtue of section 101 of the Constitution Act, 1867. The Act also was not named as part of the Constitution during patriation in 1982, although the Court itself is mentioned in the amending formula. As the Court is defined in a regular statute, it may be argued the Court could be abolished by an act of Parliament. However, in their decision in the Reference re Supreme Court Act, ss. 5 and 6, the Court ruled that certain sections of the Act, like its composition, may only be amended using the formula for constitutional amendments, pursuant to s. 41(d) of the Constitution Act, 1982.

== Background ==
In Canada, the authority to establish a national court of appeal dated back to the creation of the Province of Canada in 1840, but the power remained unused. By Confederation in 1867, the vision was for a national court of appeal was to serve as the final arbiter, particularly in disputes between the provinces and Parliament, and unify the laws of the common law provinces through judicial precedent, rather than relying solely on provincial legislatures.

When the British North America Act, 1867, was finalized, section 101 provided Parliament the option ("may") to create a general court of appeal, rather than requiring it ("shall"):

101. The Parliament of Canada may, notwithstanding anything in this Act, from Time to Time provide for the Constitution, Maintenance, and Organization of a General Court of Appeal for Canada, and for the Establishment of any additional Courts for the better Administration of the Laws of Canada. (Note: Constitution Act, 1867, s 101.)

Under Prime Minister John A. Macdonald, there were two failed attempts to establish a final court of appeal, once in 1869, (Note: Bill 80: An Act to Establish a Supreme Court for the Dominion of Canada, 2nd Session, 1st Parliament, 1869.) and again in 1870. (Note: Bill 48: An Act to establish a Supreme Court for Canada, 3rd Session, 1st Parliament, 1870.)

During the 1874 federal election, Alexander Mackenzie's Liberals included the creation of a central court of appeal as part of their campaign platform. After their election, the Mackenzie government reiterated this commitment in the throne speech of 1874. Minister of Justice Télésphore Fournier introduced a new Supreme Court Bill to Parliament in February 1875. On April 8, 1875, with bipartisan support, Parliament passed The Supreme and Exchequer Court Act, (Note: The Supreme and Exchequer Court Act, S.C. 1875, c. 11) simultaneously establishing both the Supreme Court and the Exchequer Court. After Edward Blake succeeded Fournier as justice minister, he personally staked his political reputation on the Act's successful implementation, as he saw significant personal consequences if he failed to execute it as written.

=== Early Amendments (1875–1899) ===
In 1880, Prime Minister John A. Macdonald pledged to implement substantial reforms to strengthen the Supreme Court of Canada. However, only minor procedural changes were enacted. These included granting the Court authority to order new trials and authorizing the Registrar to sit as a judge in chambers for the hearing of motions.

In 1882, Macdonald's government proposed the temporary appointment of "judges-in-aid," drawn on a rotating basis from the superior courts of Ontario and Quebec to assist the Supreme Court in its workload. The plan was poorly received by both Parliament and the legal community. The strong opposition made Macdonald cautious about pursuing further judicial reforms that might damage the Court or the Conservative Party.

A significant structural change occurred in 1887, when the Exchequer Court was formally separated from the Supreme Court, ending the dual responsibility of the justices and support staff to serve both institutions.

In 1888, Parliament formally abolished criminal appeals to the Privy Council. (Note: An Act further to amend the law respecting Procedure in Criminal Cases, S.C. 1888, c. 43) In 1926, the Privy Council in Nadan v R held the legislation as ultra vires of Parliament, overturning the abolishment of criminal appeals.

During the 1890s, additional amendments were made to the Court's reference procedure. These changes explicitly allowed advocates to represent opposing interests in reference cases, confirmed the right of appeal to the Judicial Committee of the Privy Council, and required that the justices provide written reasons for their judgments. (Note: An Act to amend Chapter one hundred and thirty-five of the Revised Statutes, entitled "An Act respecting the Supreme and Exchequer Courts", S.C. 1891, c. 25)

=== Early 20th century amendments (1900–1949) ===
Quorum was an issue for the Supreme Court in its early years. In 1910, Justice Francis Alexander Anglin without notifying other justices, submitted a draft bill to the government to permit ad hoc justices to be appointed to the Court, the proposal was ignored by the government. In 1918, after the Court was forced to suspend a sitting due to unavailability of its members, the government passed a bill permitting the Chief Justice to appoint an ad hoc judge from the Exchequer Court or a provincial chief justice. (Note: An Act to Amend the Supreme Court Act, S.C. 1918, c. 7) In practice, the Court appointed ad hoc justices based on proximity. (Note: See: In the Matter of the Port Arthur Wagon Co, 1918 CanLII 9, (1918) 57 SCR 388, Supreme Court (Canada)) By 1927, 12 different lower court judges had served in an ad hoc basis on at least 125 cases.

In 1920, Parliament amended the Supreme Court Act to standardize the minimum financial value of as a right appeals in civil matters to be $2,000 (equivalent to $28,807 in 2025) for all jurisdictions in Canada. (Note: An Act to Amend the Supreme Court Act, S.C. 1920, c. 32) Snell and Vaughan note that many of the justices of the Court were involved in the changes to the Court's administration. In 1922, Parliament expanded the Court's jurisdiction to include appeals from provincial reference questions. (Note: An Act to Amend the Supreme Court Act, S.C. 1922, c. 48)

In 1927, Parliament amended the Supreme Court Act to create a seventh position on the Court and set a mandatory retirement age of 75. (Note: An Act to Amend the Supreme Court Act, S.C. 1927, c. 38) The William Lyon Mackenzie King government had supported mandatory retirement since at least 1924, and had tried to convince Justice John Idington to retire, which he likely rejected. Idlington was removed from the Court on March 31, 1927, when the amendments to the Supreme Court Act came into force. In 1926, the Privy Council in Nadan v R held the legislation as ultra vires of Parliament, overturning the abolishment of criminal appeals; Parliament amended the Criminal Code in 1933 following the Statute of Westminster 1931, to once again abolish the criminal appeal to the Privy Council.

In 1949, Parliament abolished the appeal to the privy council, making the Supreme Court the final court of appeal in Canada. Amendments to the Supreme Court Act expanded the court from seven to nine justices, and ensured that three justices were appointed from Quebec. (Note: An Act to Amend the Supreme Court Act, S.C. 1949, c. 37)

== Section 53 ==
Section 53 of the Supreme Court Act provides the Governor in Council (also known as the Cabinet of Canada) the authority to submit reference questions.

In Reference re Secession of Quebec, the Supreme Court examined the applicability of section 53, and whether advisory questions were constitutional. The amicus curiae appointed to advocate on behalf of the government of Quebec argued that the right to secede was an invalid basis for a reference question. The complaint came in two parts, first Section 101 of the Constitution Act, 1867 did not give Parliament the authority to grant the Supreme Court jurisdiction to pass section 53. Secondly, section 53 is to be interpreted to exclude questions where the court does not have jurisdiction, and in the case of Reference re Secession of Quebec is international law. Finally, the question Reference re Secession of Quebec posed was political in nature, and therefore could not be answered by the Supreme Court. (Note: Reference re Secession of Quebec, [1998] 2 SCR 217, para 4.) When considered Parliament's jurisdiction to pass section 53, the court noted in Re References by Governor-General in Council (1910) the Supreme Court and Privy Council upheld the Court's special jurisdiction. (Note: Reference re Secession of Quebec, [1998] 2 SCR 217, para 6.) The Court found section 53 could be validly enacted considering the "pith and substance" of the legislation is to create a general court of appeal, a court of appeal could in exceptional circumstances receive original jurisdiction, (Note: Reference re Secession of Quebec, [1998] 2 SCR 217, para 9.) and there is no constitutional bar for the court to accept a reference question or undertake such an advisory role. (Note: Reference re Secession of Quebec, [1998] 2 SCR 217, para 15.)

== See also ==
- History of the Supreme Court of Canada

== Notes and references ==
=== Works cited ===
- Bushnell, Ian (1992). Captive Court: A Study of the Supreme Court of Canada. McGill-Queen's University Press. ISBN 978-0-7735-0851-4.
- McCormick, Peter (2000), Supreme at last: the evolution of the Supreme Court of Canada, J. Lorimer, ISBN 978-1-55028-693-9
- Snell, James G.; Vaughan, Frederick (1985). The Supreme Court of Canada: History of the Institution. Toronto: The Osgoode Society. ISBN 978-0-8020-3417-5.
