= Reference Re Companies' Creditors Arrangement Act =

- Supreme Court of Canada

Hearing: 27–29 March 1934 Judgment: 6 June 1934
- Full case name: In the Matter of a Reference Concerning the Constitutional Validity of the Companies’ Creditors Arrangement Act
- Citations: 1934 CanLII 72 (SCC), [1934] SCR 659
- Prior history: REFERENCE to the Supreme Court of Canada for hearing and consideration pursuant to the authority of s. 55 of the Supreme Court Act (R.S.C., 1927, c. 35)
- Ruling: The Companies’ Creditors Arrangement Act is intra vires of the Parliament of Canada. The matters dealt with come within the domain of “bankruptcy and insolvency” within the meaning of s. 91 (21) of the B.N.A. Act.

Court membership
- Chief Justice: Lyman Duff; Puisne Justices: Thibaudeau Rinfret, John Henderson Lamont, Lawrence Arthur Dumoulin Cannon, Oswald Smith Crocket, Frank Joseph Hughes

Reasons given
- Majority: Duff CJ, joined by Rinfret, Crocket and Hughes JJ
- Concurrence: Cannon J, joined by Lamont J

Reference Re Companies' Creditors Arrangement Act is a decision of the Supreme Court of Canada on the constitutionality of the Companies' Creditors Arrangement Act as part of the bankruptcy and insolvency jurisdiction of the Parliament of Canada.

== Background ==
At the onset of the Great Depression, the Parliament of Canada passed the Companies' Creditors Arrangement Act, 1933 ("CCAA") in order to provide an alternative procedure other than liquidation that could be used by insolvent companies. Charles Cahan, Secretary of State of Canada, said at the bill's first reading, it was necessary “because of the prevailing commercial and industrial depression.”

The provinces of Quebec and Ontario disputed the constitutionality of the Act, as they believed it intruded into provincial jurisdiction with respect to property and civil rights. Accordingly, the federal government posed the following reference question to the Supreme Court of Canada:

Is The Companies’ Creditors Arrangement Act, 1933, 23-24 Geo. V, chapter 36, ultra vires of the Parliament of Canada, either in whole or in part, and, if so, in what particular or particulars, or to what extent?

== At the Supreme Court of Canada ==
The Court unanimously ruled that the Act was intra vires the Parliament of Canada, as it dealt with matters falling within "bankruptcy and insolvency" under s. 91(21) of the British North America Act, 1867.

=== Majority ruling by Duff CJ ===
Legislation in respect of compositions and arrangements is a natural and ordinary component of a system of bankruptcy and insolvency law, and provisions similar to the CCAA had already been passed before and after Confederation. However, the provisions of the Bankruptcy Act, 1919 apply only when an assignment or receiving order has been issued, and the Winding-Up Act applies only in the case of a company which is in course of being wound up. The CCAA, on the other hand, creates powers which can be exercised in case, and only in case, of insolvency.

Therefore, the Act enables arrangements to be made with respect to an insolvent company, under judicial authority which, otherwise, might not be valid prior to the initiation of proceedings in bankruptcy. As Lord Cave stated in Royal Bank of Canada v. Larue, “the exclusive legislative authority to deal with all matters within the domain of bankruptcy and insolvency is vested in Parliament.”

=== Concurring ruling by Cannon J ===
Before and since Confederation, arrangements with the creditors have always been of the very essence of any system of bankruptcy or insolvency legislation. Under current Canadian law and under the British Bankruptcy Act 1914, where a person is subject to bankruptcy proceedings, and if no composition or scheme of arrangement is approved, he will be declared bankrupt, and his property becomes divisible among his creditors and vests in a trustee.

While CCAA proceedings are not bankruptcy proceedings, they are insolvency proceedings. As such, they are intended to prevent a declaration of bankruptcy, where it would be in the best interest of the creditors. Such an intent has been expressed in Canadian law since the pre-Confederation Insolvent Act of 1864. Cushing v. Dupuy and Royal Bank of Canada v Larue were stated as authority under which Parliament could pass the Act.

== Impact ==
Many Canadian legal commentators at the time expected that the CCAA, together with 1934's Farmers' Creditors Arrangement Act, would be declared unconstitutional as encroaching upon the provincial power over property and civil rights in relation to the rights of secured creditors, and they were astonished when both were upheld. (Note: The FCAA would be held to be constitutional by the SCC, and the Judicial Committee of the Privy Council subsequently agreed.) The Parliament of Canada would not further extend its reach over secured creditors until 1992's amendments to the Bankruptcy and Insolvency Act.

After being employed in the 1930s, the CCAA did not see significant usage again until the 1980s. The Supreme Court of Canada did not hear any appeals relating to the CCAA until Century Services Inc. v. Canada (Attorney General) in 2010.
