= Lawrence John Cannon =

Canadian lawyer and judge

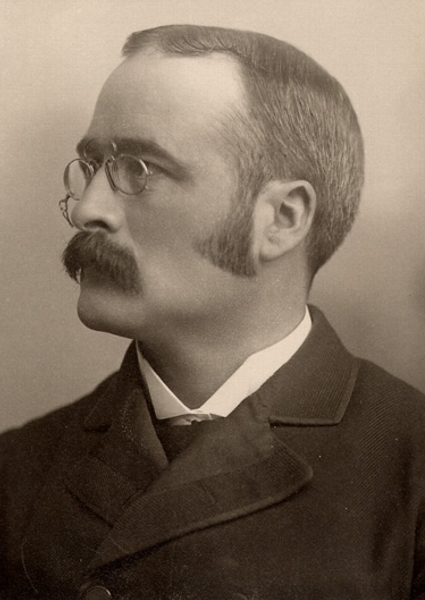
- Born: November 18, 1852; Quebec City, Canada East
- Died: January 30, 1921 (aged 68); Quebec City, Quebec
- Occupations: lawyer, jurist
- Known for: Quebec Judge
- Political party: Liberal
- Spouse: Marie-Hermine-Aurélie-Alida Dumoulin
- Children: Lawrence Arthur Dumoulin Cannon; Lucien Cannon
- Relatives: Edward Cannon, great-grandfather Jean-Gaspard Dumoulin, father-in-law

Lawrence John Cannon (November 18, 1852 – January 30, 1921) was a Canadian lawyer and judge.

Born in Quebec City, Canada East, the son of Lawrence Ambrose Cannon and Mary Jane Cary, his godfather was Augustin-Norbert Morin. Cannon studied at the Séminaire de Québec and the Séminaire de Nicolet before receiving a law degree from the Université Laval. He was called to the Quebec Bar in 1874 and practiced law in Arthabaskaville (Victoriaville) in partnership with Édouard-Louis Pacaud. In 1882, he ran unsuccessfully as the Liberal candidate for the House of Commons of Canada in the riding of Drummond—Arthabaska losing to Désiré Olivier Bourbeau. In 1891, he was appointed deputy attorney general and law clerk for the province of Quebec. He was appointed a judge of the Superior Court for the district of Trois-Rivières in 1905 and served as a judge until his death in 1921.
