= Reference Re Amendments to the Residential Tenancies Act (NS) =

- Supreme Court of Canada

Hearing: 5 October 1995 Judgment: 22 February 1996
- Citations: [1996] 1 SCR 186
- Docket No.: 24276
- Prior history: APPEAL and CROSS‑APPEAL from Re Amendments to the Residential Tenancies Act (NS), 1994 CanLII 3988 (11 May 1994)
- Ruling: Appeal allowed and cross‑appeal dismissed.

Court membership
- Chief Justice: Antonio Lamer; Puisne Justices: Gérard La Forest, Claire L'Heureux-Dubé, John Sopinka, Charles Gonthier, Peter Cory, Beverley McLachlin, Frank Iacobucci, John C. Major

Reasons given
- Majority: McLachlin J, joined by La Forest, L'Heureux-Dubé, Iacobucci and Major JJ
- Concurrence: Lamer CJ, joined by Sopinka and Cory JJ
- Concurrence: Gonthier J

Reference Re Amendments to the Residential Tenancies Act (NS), [1996] 1 S.C.R. 186 is a reference question put to the Supreme Court of Canada regarding the ability of the federal government to appoint judges under section 96 of the Constitution Act, 1867.

The Court considered that giving all of the jurisdiction of Superior Courts to other bodies would make s. 96 meaningless. Instead, the Court developed a three-part test to determine whether it is permissible for a provincial government to give powers of a Superior, or "Section 96" Court, to another provincial, or "section 92" court.

1. Is the power in question something over which Superior Courts had jurisdiction in 1867?
2. Is the power in question a judicial function, rather than an administrative one?
3. Is the removal of the judicial power the main point of the exercise, rather than just an ancillary part of a larger reform of the way that the jurisdiction is exercised?

If the answer to all three of these questions is "yes", then it is unconstitutional to remove this power.
