= Reference Re Secession of Quebec =

1998 Canadian Supreme Court case on the ability of Quebec to legally secede from Canada

- Supreme Court of Canada

Hearing: February 16–19, 1998 Judgment: August 20, 1998
- Citations: [1998] 2 SCR 217; 1998 CanLII 793 (SCC); (1998), 161 DLR (4th) 385; (1998), 55 CRR (2d) 1
- Docket No.: 25506

Holding
- Quebec cannot secede from Canada unilaterally; however, a clear vote on a clear question to secede in a referendum should lead to negotiations between Quebec and the rest of Canada for secession. However, above all, secession would require a constitutional amendment.

Court membership
- Chief Justice: Antonio Lamer; Puisne Justices: Claire L'Heureux-Dubé, John Sopinka, Charles Gonthier, Peter Cory, Beverley McLachlin, Frank Iacobucci, John C. Major, Michel Bastarache

Reasons given
- Unanimous reasons by: The Court

Reference Re Secession of Quebec, [1998] 2 SCR 217, often referred to as the Secession Reference, is a landmark judgment of the Supreme Court of Canada regarding the legality, under both Canadian and international law, of a unilateral secession of Quebec from Canada.

Both the Quebec government and the Canadian government stated they were pleased with the Supreme Court's opinion, pointing to different sections of the ruling.

== Background ==
Following the election of a majority of Parti Québécois (PQ) Members of the National Assembly (MNAs) in the 1976 Quebec provincial election, the party formed a government and, in 1980, held an independence referendum. The government of the Province of Quebec asked the province's population if it should seek a mandate to negotiate sovereignty for Quebec coupled with the establishment of a new political and economic union with Canada. The referendum resulted in the defeat of the sovereignty option, with 59.6% voting no on sovereignty. The PQ was nevertheless re-elected in 1981, this time promising not to hold a referendum.

In 1982, the federal government petitioned the Parliament of the United Kingdom in London to amend Canada's constitution so that, in the future, all further amendments would take place by means of a process of consent involving only the Parliament of Canada and the legislatures of the provinces. Up until this point, all amendments had taken place by means of Acts of the British Parliament, since the Canadian constitution was, strictly speaking, a simple statute of that Parliament. Colloquially, the switch to a domestic amendment procedure was known as patriation. The particular amending formula adopted in 1982 was opposed by the then-government of Quebec. Other concomitant constitutional changes such as the Canadian Charter of Rights and Freedoms were also opposed by Quebec, based not on rejection of their content (since, in 1975, Quebec had adopted a more complete Quebec Charter of Human Rights and Freedoms) but on the manner of their adoption and lack of amendments specific to Quebec in the package.

Subsequently, two attempts were made at amending the Canadian constitution (the Meech Lake Accord in 1987–1990 and the Charlottetown Accord in 1992) that, it was hoped, would have caused the Quebec legislature to adopt a motion supporting the revised constitution. Following the failure of both of these to pass, there was a widespread sense in the mid-1990s that the Constitution of Canada was not fully legitimate because it had not yet received the formal approval of Quebec.

In 1994, the Parti Québécois was re-elected and announced that it would be initiating a second referendum to take place in 1995. This time, the question was on sovereignty with an optional partnership with Canada. The "no" side won by only a narrow margin. Prior to this referendum, the National Assembly of Quebec had adopted a bill relating to the future of Quebec that laid out a plan if secession was approved in a referendum.

In response to the bill and the referendum result, several legal actions were initiated by opponents to the independence of Quebec questioning the legality of secession. In 1996, Parti Québécois leader Lucien Bouchard announced his government would make plans to hold another referendum when he was confident that the "winning conditions" were there, pointing to the political cost of losing a third referendum. In reaction to Bouchard's stated plans, Prime Minister Jean Chrétien initiated a reference on the legality of a unilateral declaration of independence by a Canadian province.

== Questions addressed ==
On September 30, 1996, the Cabinet of Jean Chrétien (i.e., the Governor in Council) approved Order in Council PC 1996–1497 under Section 53 of the Supreme Court Act, referring three questions to the Supreme Court of Canada regarding secession. (Note: Reference re Secession of Quebec, [1998] 2 SCR 217, para 2.)

1. Under the Constitution of Canada, can the National Assembly, legislature or government of Quebec effect the secession of Quebec from Canada unilaterally?
2. Does international law give the National Assembly, legislature or government of Quebec the right to effect the secession of Quebec from Canada unilaterally? In this regard, is there a right to self‑determination under international law that would give the National Assembly, legislature or government of Quebec the right to effect the secession of Quebec from Canada unilaterally?
3. In the event of a conflict between domestic and international law on the right of the National Assembly, legislature or government of Quebec to effect the secession of Quebec from Canada unilaterally, which would take precedence in Canada?

== Submissions ==
There were an unprecedented 15 interveners. However, the Quebec government refused to take part and was not represented. In its place the Court appointed André Jolicoeur as an amicus curiae to present the argument Quebec may have made, had they participated.

The federal government’s submission argued that the only way a province could secede from Canada would be through a constitutional amendment. Only an amendment through section 45 (on the right of provincial legislatures to make laws amending their own constitutions) would allow for unilateral constitutional amendments, they argued, but that section would not apply to the question of secession. To attempt to secede unilaterally (that is, without negotiations) would violate the constitution on two grounds. First, it would violate the rule of law by ignoring the authority of the constitution as supreme law of the country, and second, it would violate Canadian federalism by acting with powers allocated only to the federal government.

The amicus curiae's submission argued several points. First, it argued that the reference was invalid; the question is purely a political one and thus is outside the authority of the Court to answer under section 53 of the Supreme Court Act. It attempted to analogize the use of the US political question doctrine to the Canadian constitution. Furthermore, the question is speculative and premature as there are no substantive facts at question. Second, it focused on the second question, claiming that the Supreme Court of Canada had no jurisdiction over interpreting international law. The submission said that though Quebec could be considered a “peoples” under the Charter of the United Nations, the right to self-determination under that Charter applies to colonized, oppressed, etc. peoples and therefore does not apply to Quebec. It further claimed that since there is no international law barring separation then there must be an implied right to do so. The primary argument was that the doctrine of effectivity gave them authority to secede. That is, recognition of a new state by other countries would validate the separation. It further claimed that the doctrine of effectivity is part of constitutional conventions through its practice in other parts of the commonwealth.

Several aboriginal interveners submitted facta on their right to stay in Canada based on treaties and their right to self-determination, further noting that they have already held two referendums, which decided against the separation of the aboriginal peoples from Canada. Their factum attacked the attorney general's factum on the basis that it completely ignored the role of aboriginal people within the constitution.

== Opinion ==
=== Right to secede under Canadian law ===
The court addressed the three questions in order. First, they stated that, under the Canadian Constitution (and with Quebec being a party to it since its inception), unilateral secession was not legal. However, should a referendum decide in favour of independence, the rest of Canada "would have no basis to deny the right of the government of Quebec to pursue secession." Negotiations would have to follow to define the terms under which Quebec would gain independence, should it maintain that goal. In this section of the judgement they stated that the Constitution is made up of written and unwritten principles (based on text, historical context, and previous constitutional jurisprudence) and that there are four fundamental tenets of the Canadian constitution. Those four interrelated and equally important principles or values are:

1. Federalism – the principle that seeks to “reconcile diversity with unity” by giving federal authority over only those issues of common interest amongst culturally diverse and politically independent provinces. The purpose of Canada's federalism is not only to create a loose association amongst provinces, but a true national unity.
2. Democracy – the principle that seeks to promote participation in effective representative self-government, which respects and responds to all voices in a marketplace of ideas.
3. Constitutionalism and the Rule of Law – the principles that protect citizens from state actions by forcing governments to act under the rule of law, the constitution of Canada being the supreme law. The constitution's entrenched protections of minorities ensure that the country does not operate simply on majority rule and enable a true democracy in which minority voices are fairly considered.
4. Protection of Minorities – the principle that guides the other principles, but one which is also independent and fundamental because of its uniqueness to Canada relative to other federal, constitutional democracies.

They held that these pieces cannot be viewed independently but all interact as part of the Constitutional framework of Canada.

=== Rights to secede under international law and self-determination ===
The answer to the second question, which concerned Quebec's right under international law to secede, gave the opinion that the international law on secession was not applicable to the situation of Quebec. The court pointed out that international law "does not specifically grant component parts of sovereign states the legal right to secede unilaterally from their 'parent' state." (Note: Reference re Secession of Quebec, [1998] 2 SCR 217, para 111.)

The Supreme Court of Canada's opinion stated that the right of a people to self-determination was expected to be exercised within the framework of existing states, by negotiation, for example. Such a right could only be exercised unilaterally under certain circumstances, under current international law. The court held that:

The various international documents that support the existence of a people's right to self-determination also contain parallel statements supportive of the conclusion that the exercise of such a right must be sufficiently limited to prevent threats to an existing state's territorial integrity or the stability of relations between sovereign states.

— (Note: Reference re Secession of Quebec, [1998] 2 SCR 217, para 127.)

and that

A state whose government represents the whole of the people or peoples resident within its territory, on a basis of equality and without discrimination, and respects the principles of self-determination in its own internal arrangements, is entitled to the protection under international law of its territorial integrity.

— (Note: Reference re Secession of Quebec, [1998] 2 SCR 217, para 130.)

The court stated in its opinion that, under international law, the right to secede was meant for peoples under a colonial rule or foreign occupation. Otherwise, so long as a people has the meaningful exercise of its right to self-determination within an existing nation state, there is no right to secede unilaterally.

For close to 40 of the last 50 years, the Prime Minister of Canada has been a Quebecer. During this period, Quebecers have held from time to time all the most important positions in the federal Cabinet. During the 8 years prior to June 1997, the Prime Minister and the Leader of the Official Opposition in the House of Commons were both Quebecers. At present, the Right Honourable Chief Justice and two other members of the Court, the Chief of Staff of the Canadian Armed Forces and the Canadian ambassador to the United States, not to mention the Deputy Secretary-General of the United Nations, are all Quebecers. The international achievements of Quebecers in most fields of human endeavour are too numerous to list. Since the dynamism of the Quebec people has been directed toward the business sector, it has been clearly successful in Quebec, the rest of Canada and abroad.

— (Note: Reference re Secession of Quebec, [1998] 2 SCR 217, para 135.)

The Supreme Court further stated that: Quebec could not, despite a clear referendum result, purport to invoke a right of self-determination to dictate the terms of a proposed secession to the other parties to the federation. (Note: Reference re Secession of Quebec, [1998] 2 SCR 217, para 151.) The democratic vote, by however strong a majority, would have no legal effect on its own and could not push aside the principles of federalism and the rule of law, the rights of individuals and minorities, or the operation of democracy in the other provinces or in Canada as a whole.

=== Which law applies in Canada? ===
Since the court saw no conflict between Canadian law and international law on the question (neither would allow Quebec to secede unilaterally), it considered it unnecessary to answer the question.

== Significance ==
The decision has been regarded as a model discussion in international law for questions of separation between national political entities, particularly in relation to the results of a referendum.

The Quebec government of Lucien Bouchard stated that it was very pleased with the opinion of the Supreme Court. Premier Bouchard stated publicly that the court had validated the referendum strategy that the sovereigntists had adopted with René Lévesque. Quebec was most satisfied when the court made it clear that the question of Quebec's political status was above all a political question, not a legal one. It also liked the fact that the Supreme Court made it clear that the government of Canada and that of the other provinces would have to negotiate after a winning referendum on secession. This would make a unilateral declaration of independence unnecessary.

The Canadian government of Jean Chrétien stated that it was pleased with the court's opinion. The Supreme Court had made it clear that Quebec could not declare independence unilaterally. Any obligation of Canada to negotiate with Quebec was conditional on the sovereigntists' asking a clear question within the context of a referendum. The government of Canada subsequently drafted the Clarity Act, which Parliament then enacted.

== See also ==
- List of Supreme Court of Canada cases (Lamer Court)
- Unilateral declaration of independence
- Politics of Canada
- Politics of Quebec
- 1980 Quebec referendum
- 1995 Quebec referendum
- Timeline of Quebec history
- List of years in Canada
- Texas v. White – A similar case in the United States
