= Ontario Bar Association =

Canadian provincial legal organization

The Ontario Bar Association (OBA) is a bar association representing more than 16,000 lawyers, judges, notaries, law teachers, and law students from across Ontario. It is also a branch of the Canadian Bar Association. Approximately two-thirds of all practicing lawyers in Canada belong to the CBA.

Established in 1907, the OBA was incorporated on April 22, 1985. It is a voluntary association for legal members, whereas the regulatory body for lawyers in the province is under the Law Society of Ontario.

The OBA is headed by a President and a 21-member Board of Directors.

== Vision and mission ==
"To be indispensable to our members, the legal profession and the administration of justice in Ontario."

As the professional association for Ontario's lawyers, judges and law students, the OBA will:

1. Advance the interests of our members, the justice system and the rule of law in Ontario;
2. Be the leading provider of high quality continuing professional development for lawyers throughout Ontario;
3. Support a network where all our members share their practical experience, knowledge and ideas.

== Mandate and priorities ==
The mandate of the CBA-OBA is to:

- improve the law;
- improve the administration of justice;
- improve and promote access to justice;
- promote equality in the legal profession and in the justice system;
- improve and promote the knowledge, skills, ethical standards and well-being of members of the legal profession;
- represent the legal profession nationally and internationally; and
- promote the interests of the members of CBA.

== Sections ==
The Ontario Bar Association has 40 specialty groups, or Sections, that focus on substantive areas of the law and the legal profession. More than 10,000 members participate in Ontario Sections. They are:

- Aboriginal Law
- Administrative Law
- Alternative Dispute Resolution
- Business Law
- Canadian Corporate Counsel Association - Ontario Chapter
- Charity and Not-for-Profit-Law
- Child and Youth Law
- Citizenship and Immigration Law
- Civil Litigation
- Class Actions Law
- Constitutional, Civil Liberties and Human Rights Law
- Construction and Infrastructure Law
- Criminal Justice
- Education Law
- Elder Law
- Entertainment, Media and Communications Law
- Environmental Law
- Family Law
- Franchise Law
- Health Law
- Information Technology and Intellectual Property Law
- Insolvency Law
- Insurance Law
- International Law
- Labour & Employment Law
- Law Practice Management
- Municipal Law
- Natural Resources and Energy Law
- Pensions and Benefits Law
- Privacy and Access to Information Law
- Public Sector Lawyers
- Real Property Law
- Sexual Orientation and Gender Identity Law
- Sole Small Firm and General Practice
- Students
- Taxation Law
- Trusts and Estates Law
- Women Lawyers Forum
- Workers' Compensation
- Young Lawyers Division

== Presidents ==
List of recent Presidents of the OBA:

- Kathryn Manning 2024–Present
- Kelly McDermott 2023–2024
- Karen Perron 2021–2023
- Charlene Theodore 2020–2021
- Colin Stevenson 2019–2020
- Lynne M.J. Vicars 2018–2019
- Quinn M. Ross 2017–2018
- David L. Sterns 2016–2017
- Edwin G. Upenieks 2015–2016
- Orlando Da Silva, LSM 2014–2015
- Pascale Daigneault 2013–2014
- Morris A. Chochla 2012–2013
- The Hon. Paul R. Sweeny 2011–2012
- R. Lee Akazaki 2010–2011
- The Hon. Carole J. Brown 2009–2010
- The Hon. Jamie K. Trimble 2008–2009
- Gregory D. Goulin, LSM 2007–2008
- James C. Morton 2006–2007
- The Hon. Heather McGee 2005–2006
- Ian Kirby 2004–2005
- Jonathan Speigel 2003–2004
- Virginia MacLean, Q.C. 2002–2003
- James F. O’Brien 2001–2002
- Thomas C. Marshall 2000–2001
- Susan T. McGrath 1999–2000
- Steven F. Rosenhek 1998–1999
- William J. Simpson, Q.C., LSM 1997–1998
- The Hon. Michelle K. Fuerst 1996–1997
- Douglas J. Los 1995–1996
- Igor Ellyn, Q.C. 1994–1995
- D. Kevin Carroll, Q.C. 1994–1995
- Erica L. James 1993–1994
- J. Kenneth Alexander 1992–1993
- Garth Manning, Q.C. 1991–1992
- Thomas G. Heintzman, Q.C., 1989–1990
- J. Douglas Grenkie, Q.C. 1988–1999
- Harvey J. Bliss, Q.C. 1987–1988
- Stephen R. Cameron 1987–1988
- J. Alex Langford 1985–1986
- Thomas E, Evans, Q.C. 1984–1985
- The Hon. Lorraine Gotlib 1983–1984
- Raymond J. Ostiguy 1982–1983
- John R. Finley, Q.C. 1981–1982
- The Hon. Joseph Potts 1980–1981
- The Hon. Mr. Justice John R.R. Jennings 1979–1980
- William H. Kidd, Q.C. 1978–1979

== See also ==
- Law Society of Ontario
- Manitoba Bar Association
