= Christie v York =

Decision of the Supreme Court of Canada

Christie v York (1939), [1940] S.C.R. 139 is a famous decision of the Supreme Court of Canada where the Court allowed private establishments to discriminate on the basis of free enterprise.

== Background ==
Fred Christie was a black chauffeur in Montreal. On July 11, 1936, Christie and several friends went to watch a boxing match at the Forum. Afterwards they went to a local tavern where the bartender refused to serve Christie on account of the bar's policy against blacks. Christie complained and called the police in protest but to little effect.

Christie brought an action against the bar for $200.

At trial, Christie was awarded costs and an additional $25. The judge found that section 33 of the Quebec License Act, which stated that "No licensee for a restaurant may refuse without reasonable cause, to give food to travelers", was violated by the bar's policy. On appeal, the Court of King's Bench found in favor of the bar on account that section 33 did not apply, rather, "a merchant or trader is free to carry on his business in the manner he conceives to be best for that business".

== Opinion of the Court ==
In a 4 to 1 decision, the Court found that section 33 of the Quebec Licence Act did not apply and the bar was able to refuse service to whomever it chose.

The Court noted that as a general rule a merchant can do business with whomever they may choose and has complete freedom of business. Reading the Act strictly, Christie was not a "traveller" and was not "seeking food". Moreover, the Court found no public policy reason to read the Act broadly. Thus, the Court could not do anything about the bar's practice.

Justice Davis, alone in dissent, held that the spirit of section 33 is to prevent arbitrary discrimination such as the current situation and should be interpreted as such.

== Legacy ==
After the decision, Christie was thought to have moved to Vermont in disgust. In actuality, he and his family moved first to the Montreal neighbourhood of Park Extension, then southwards to Saranac Lake, N.Y. His descendants still live in Upstate New York.
