= Vita Food Products Inc v Unus Shipping Co Ltd =

JCPC decision on choice of law clauses

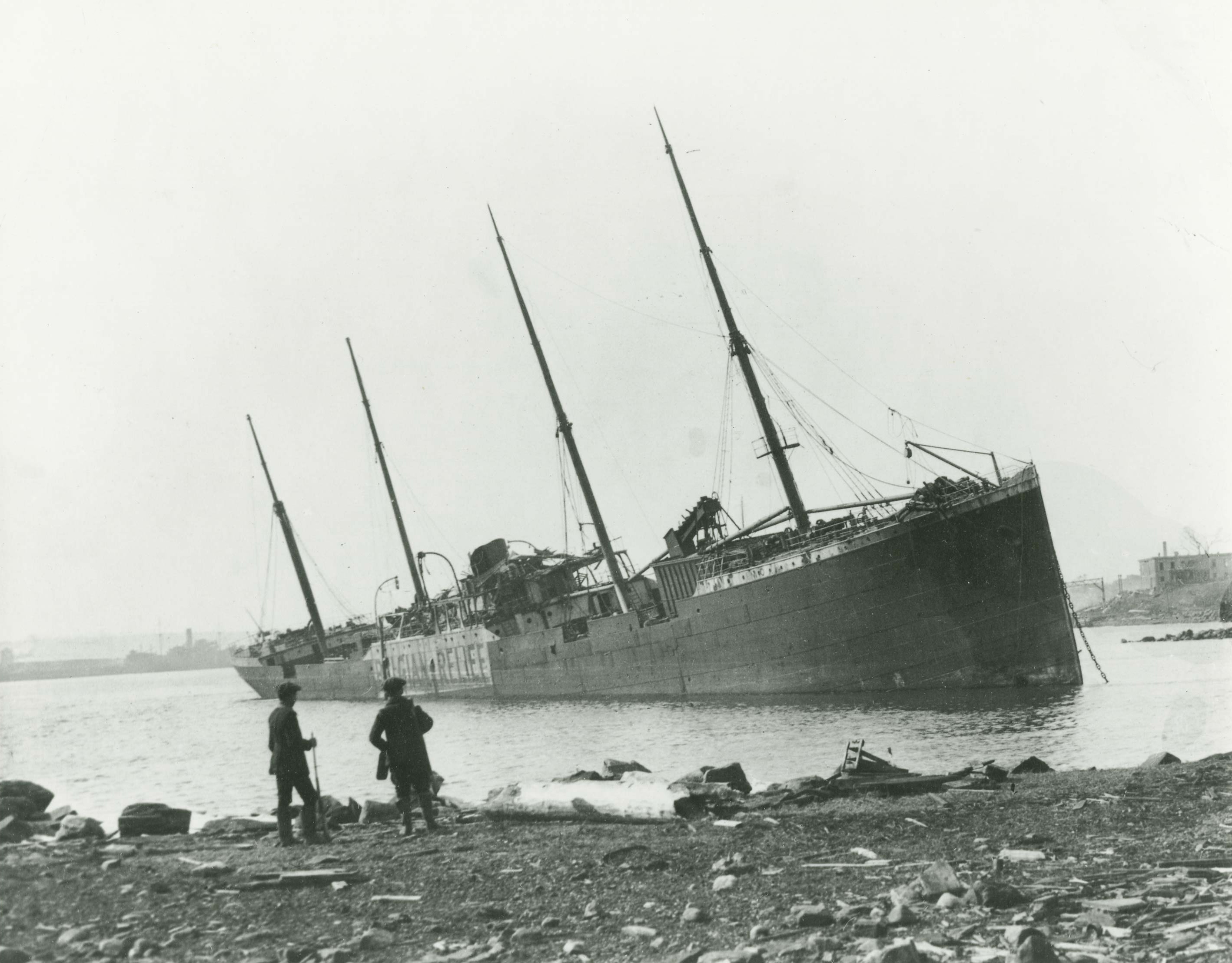
- Court: Judicial Committee of the Privy Council
- Full case name: Vita Food Products Inc v Unus Shipping Company Limited in liquidation
- Decided: 30 January 1939
- Citations: [1939] UKPC 7, [1939] A.C. 277 (P.C.), (1939) 63 Ll L Rep 21

Case history
- Appealed from: Supreme Court of Nova Scotia

Court membership
- Judges sitting: Lord Atkin, Lord Russell of Killowen, Lord Macmillan, Lord Wright, Lord Porter

Case opinions
- Decision by: Lord Wright

Keywords
- Conflict of laws

Vita Food Products Inc v Unus Shipping Co Ltd [1939] UKPC 7, is a leading decision of the Judicial Committee of the Privy Council on the conflict of laws. The case stands for the proposition that an express choice of law clause in a contract should be honoured as long as the agreement was bona fide and not against public policy. The case is significant in the field of contract law, as it greatly expanded the ability of parties to choose the jurisdiction of their contacts.

== Facts ==
Three lots of herring were accepted by the Hurry On (owned by Unus Shipping, a Nova Scotia corporation) at Middle Arm, Newfoundland for shipment to Vita Foods of New York. The bills of lading — which, the judgment states, "[b]y some error or inadvertence ... were old ones used outside Newfoundland", — provided for exemption from liability for master’s negligence in navigation which was allowed under the Hague Rules, which further provided that any clause or agreement in the bills of lading relieving the carrier from liability for negligence imposed by the Rules was void. There was a further provision in the bills of lading that, in the case of shipment from the United States, the Harter Act should apply and that, unless otherwise provided, the bill of lading was subject to the terms of the Canadian Water Carriage of Goods Act, 1910. Finally the bills of lading contained the following clause: "This contract shall be governed by English law."

The bills of lading for these lots did not conform to the Carriage of Goods by Sea Act 1932 (Newfoundland), which required that they contain an express clause paramount that the Hague Rules applied.

During the voyage, the ship ran into bad weather and ice off Nova Scotia and went ashore in a gale of wind. The ship was eventually set free, and made for Guysborough, where the cargo was unloaded, reconditioned and forwarded by another ship to New York, where Vita took delivery of the cargo in its damaged condition and paid for the freight.

Vita sued Unus in Nova Scotia for the damage to the cargo, salvage and other expenses. It also alleged that the Hurry On was unseaworthy, and that the bills of lading were illegal because they did not contain an express clause adopting the Hague Rules, and thus was subject to the liabilities of a common carrier. Unus, in its defence, asserted that, as the bills stated that they would be governed by English law, the Hague Rules were incorporated by reference, as they were the ones in force under the English Carriage of Goods by Sea Act 1924.

== Judicial decisions ==
=== Supreme Court of Nova Scotia ===
In the original action before the Chief Justice, which was upheld on appeal to the Supreme Court of Nova Scotia en banc, the allegation of unseaworthiness was rejected, but it was accepted that the loss was due to the captain's negligence in navigation. The contention that the bills of lading were illegal was rejected — in addition, the Court also held that if the bills of lading were held to be illegal, the parties were in pari delicto and on that ground the action must fail.

=== Privy Council ===
The Nova Scotia decision was upheld by the Privy Council, albeit for different reasons. Lord Wright, writing for the Council, noted that the following provisions of the bills in question did not apply:

- the Harter Act requirement only applied to shipments from the United States
- the Water Carriage of Goods Act, 1910 (Canada) only applied to shipments from Canadian ports, whether to other Canadian ports or ports outside Canada (at this time Newfoundland was an independent Dominion; it did not become part of Canada until 1949).

Either of the above requirements would have had effect only under the principles laid out in Dobell v. Steamship Rossmore Co., which were not applicable here.

He also observed that:

It is now well settled that by English law (and the law of Nova Scotia is the same) the proper law of the contract is the law which the parties intended to apply. That intention is objectively ascertained, and, if not expressed, will be presumed from the terms of the contract and the relevant surrounding circumstances.

Therefore, the Newfoundland statute did not apply as the proper law of the contract was England, and so the contract was upheld. He stated the test for determining the choice of law in such circumstances:

… in questions relating to the conflict of laws rules cannot generally be stated in absolute terms but rather as prima facie presumptions. But where the English rule that intention is the test applies, and where there is an express statement by the parties of their intention to select the law of the contract, it is difficult to see what qualifications are possible, provided the intention expressed is bona fide and legal, and provided there is no reason for avoiding the choice on the ground of public policy. Connection with English law is not as a matter of principle essential.

== Significance ==
Much international shipping practice is based on the assumption that the choice of law by parties is supreme, and Dicey and Morris have observed that "There appears to be no reported case in which an English court refused to give effect to an express selection by the parties, merely because the other facts of the case showed no connection between the contract and the chosen law."

== See also ==
- List of Canadian appeals to the Judicial Committee of the Privy Council
