= British Coal Corp v R =

Case of the Judicial Committee of the Privy Council

- Court: Judicial Committee of the Privy Council
- Full case name: British Coal Corporation v the King
- Decided: 6 June 1935
- Citation: [1935] UKPC 33, [1935] AC 500

Case history
- Appealed from: Court of King's Bench for the Province of Quebec (Appeal Side)

Court membership
- Judges sitting: Viscount Sankey, Lord Atkin, Lord Tomlin, Lord Macmillan, Lord Wright

Case opinions
- Decision by: Viscount Sankey

Keywords
- Colonial Laws Validity Act 1865, Statute of Westminster 1931, current competency of the Parliament of Canada

British Coal Corp v R is a decision of the Judicial Committee of the Privy Council in which the authority of the Canadian Parliament to prohibit appeals to the JCPC in criminal cases was upheld.

== Background ==
In 1875, the Parliament of Canada established the Supreme Court of Canada as a general court of appeal. This did not, however, bar rulings from the various provincial courts of appeal from being appealed directly to the Judicial Committee of the Privy Council. In 1888, appeals in criminal cases to the Judicial Committee of the Privy Council were abolished. The JCPC voided that legislation in Nadan v The King, finding that the prohibition of appeals to the Privy Council was ultra vires the authority of the Canadian Parliament under the British North America Act, 1867, because of provisions of the Colonial Laws Validity Act 1865.

After Nadan, the Imperial Parliament passed the Statute of Westminster 1931, following which the Parliament of Canada abolished criminal appeals to the Privy Council again in 1933.

In 1933, The British Coal Corporation and several other coal-importing companies had been convicted in the Court of King's Bench for the Province of Quebec (Appeal Side) on charges under the Criminal Code and the Combines Investigation Act, and were subject to fines as well as the complete prohibition of their business in importing anthracite coal into Canada. Appeals to the Court's Appeal Side were dismissed in 1934. They sought to appeal these convictions to the Privy Council, arguing that the statute contained no words which took away or diminished that prerogative, either expressly or by implication.

== The decision ==
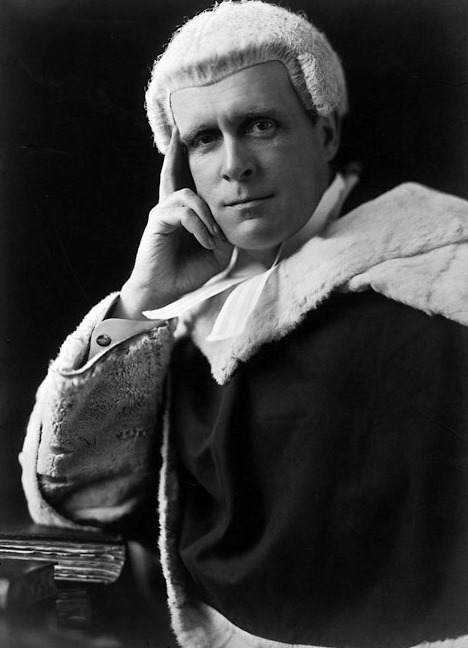
Lord Sankey

Writing for the Privy Council, Lord Sankey first described the origins of the Judicial Committee of the British Privy Council, as created by the Judicial Committee Act 1833 (as amended by the Judicial Committee Act 1844). In Sankey's words, "It is clear that the Committee is regarded in the Act as a judicial body or Court" which "exercised as a Court of law in reality, though not in name, the residual prerogative of the King in Council."

Having established that the JCPC had the role of a court of law, Sankey went on to outline the relevant legal history between the passage of the Judicial Committee Acts and the Statute of Westminster, including the enactment of the Colonial Laws Validity Act. Sankey distinguished Nadan from the present case by noting that the former decision had been based on the inconsistency of Canada's earlier prohibition of criminal appeals to the Privy Council with the Judicial Committee Acts and the Colonial Laws Validity Act. Specifically, the prohibition was inconsistent on two grounds:

  - It was repugnant to the Judicial Committee Acts, running afoul of the Colonial Laws Validity Act by implication.
  - To be effective, it had to have an extraterritorial dimension, which Canadian laws could not possess until the passage of the Statute of Westminster.

It remained to be seen, Sankey noted, whether the British North America Act gave Canada the legislative competence to prohibit criminal appeals after the Statute of Westminster had abrogated the Colonial Laws Validity Act and permitted the Parliament of Canada to pass laws having extraterritorial operation:

Their Lordships have now to decide that very same question and to decide it, as they conceive, without any direct help or guidance from earlier decisions of the Judicial Committee, now that the Statute has removed the two difficulties which were decisive in Nadan's case.

While the Statute of Westminster had removed the two limits that prevented Canada from prohibiting criminal appeals to the JCPC in Nadan, Sankey went on to argue that such a prohibition was within the scope of Canada's legislative competence under the British North America Act. In interpreting the B.N.A. Act, Sankey approached the Act in a manner similar to that which he used in the 1931 Persons case. "It must be remembered what the nature and scope of the Act are," he wrote. "In interpreting a constituent .. or organic statute such as the Act, that construction most beneficial to the widest possible amplitude of its powers must be adopted."

Applying this "large and liberal" method of construction to the B.N.A. Act, Sankey found that s. 91 of the Act did empower the Canadian Parliament to forbid appeals to the JCPC.

It does not indeed do so by express terms, but it does so by necessary intendment. Sect. 91 of the Act, read along with the rest of the Act, is, according to its true construction in their Lordships' opinion, apart from the limitations already referred to, intended to make and is apt to make the Dominion Legislature supreme and endow it with the same authority as the Imperial Parliament, within the assigned limits of subject and area...

While noting that the Parliament of the United Kingdom could, if it wished, repeal all or part of the Statute of Westminster, enabling it to reassert its authority over Canadian affairs at any time, Sankey noted that this was a matter of "theory and has no relation to realities. In truth Canada is in enjoyment of the full scope of self-government."

== Aftermath ==
The Parliament of Canada subsequently abolished civil appeals to the Privy Council in 1949, after the Privy Council affirmed that Parliament had the right to do so.

== Nature of the Statute of Westminster 1931 ==
The Statute of Westminster 1931 has been described as "the last of the Imperial Acts of the Parliament applicable to all the Dominions. It granted Canada...what amounted to independence." More specifically, it removed limits on the legislative competence of the Parliament of Canada. "The Statute of Westminster had removed any legislative incompetence from the Canadian legislature and accordingly the legislature had full power to enact the section in question."

The Statute of Westminster freed Dominion legislatures from the constraints of the Colonial Laws Validity Act, under which colonial laws "repugnant" to laws, orders, or regulations imposed by the United Kingdom Parliament were to be considered "absolutely void and inoperative." That was the basis on which the prohibition of appeals to the Privy Council in criminal matters had been struck down in Nadan.
