= Nadan v R =

1926 Judicial Committee of the Privy Council ruling

- Arms of the Judicial Committee of the Privy Council
- Court: Judicial Committee of the Privy Council
- Full case name: Frank Nadan v The King
- Decided: 25 February 1926
- Citation: [1926] UKPC 13, [1926] AC 482

Case history
- Appealed from: Appellate Division of the Supreme Court of Alberta

Court membership
- Judges sitting: The Lord Chancellor, Lord Dunedin, Lord Shaw, Lord Phillimore, Lord Blanesburgh

Case opinions
- Decision by: The Lord Chancellor

Keywords
- Royal prerogative, jurisdiction of the Judicial Committee of the Privy Council

Nadan v R is a key ruling of the Judicial Committee of the Privy Council in determining the competence of the Parliament of Canada with respect to the restrictions laid out in the Colonial Laws Validity Act 1865, and whether it possessed extraterritorial jurisdiction.

== Background ==
In 1875, the Parliament of Canada established the Supreme Court of Canada as a general court of appeal. This did not, however, bar rulings from the various provincial courts of appeal from being appealed directly to the Judicial Committee of the Privy Council. In 1888, Parliament enacted a provision to abolish appeals in criminal cases to the Judicial Committee of the Privy Council, which was later incorporated as s 1025 of the Criminal Code:

1025. Notwithstanding any Royal Prerogative, or anything contained within the Interpretation Act or in the Supreme Court Act, no appeal shall be brought in any criminal case from any judgment or order of any Court in Canada to any court of appeal or authority by which in the United Kingdom appeals or petitions to His Majesty in Council may be heard.

In 1924, Frank Nadan, working for his employer (a British Columbia common carrier), was transporting intoxicating liquor from Alberta to Montana, which was subject to a prohibition on alcohol. Near Coleman, Alberta, he was arrested by the Alberta Provincial Police for:

- having liquor not sealed in accordance with Alberta's liquor control laws, and
- transporting liquor in a manner not allowed by the Canada Temperance Act.

He was convicted on both counts, and appealed these convictions to the Appellate Division of the Supreme Court of Alberta. Those appeals were dismissed, but the court gave leave to appeal to the Judicial Committee of the Privy Council.

The respondent presented a petition to the Council, asking that the appeals be quashed because they were barred under s. 1025. Leave was granted for the attorneys-general of Alberta and Canada to intervene.

== Judgment of the Privy Council ==
The appeals were dismissed, but the Privy Council took the occasion to discuss the competence of the Canadian Parliament to abolish criminal appeals to them.

- the appellant's submission that the first count was not a "criminal case" within the meaning of s.1025 was rejected, as the Privy Council had previously ruled on this question
- the Board proceeded to consider the effect of s. 1025 on the assumption that it applied to these appeals
- the Judicial Committee Act 1833 provided for appeals to the Privy Council from any court in "the East Indies and in the Plantations, Colonies and other Dominions of His Majesty abroad"
- s. 2 of the Colonial Laws Validity Act 1865 provided that any colonial law that was repugnant to any Act of the United Kingdom that extended to that colony was void and inoperative
- unlike in Australia and South Africa, no provision had been made by the United Kingdom to allow for Canada to restrict appeals to the Privy Council
- the Board had previously declared that the provinces could not permit "the abrogation of any power which the Crown possesses through a person directly representing it",
- such restriction on the power of s. 92 of the British North America Act, 1867 applies equally to s. 91
- therefore, Canada did not have the ability to abrogate a power which remains vested in the Crown itself

On the final question as to whether to recommend special leave to appeal, the Board noted that it was settled practice that, in criminal cases, it would intervene only where substantial and grave injustice had been done by:

- a disregard of the forms of legal process, or
- some violation of the principles of natural justice

The present cases did not fall within this exceptional category. Accordingly, dismissal was recommended for these appeals.

== Aftermath ==
After the passage of the Statute of Westminster 1931, the Parliament of Canada abolished criminal appeals to the Privy Council again in 1933, and that measure was upheld by the Privy Council in British Coal Corporation v. the King. It was followed by the abolition of civil appeals in 1949, after the Privy Council affirmed that Parliament also had the right to do so.

The Nadan decision was criticized in Canada, with John Erskine Read accusing the Privy Council of misunderstanding and applying R v National Bell Liquors and narrowly construing the authority of Parliament to deal with matter criminal in nature.
