= Henry Hague Davis =

Canadian Supreme Court judge (1885–1944)

The Honourable Henry Hague Davis
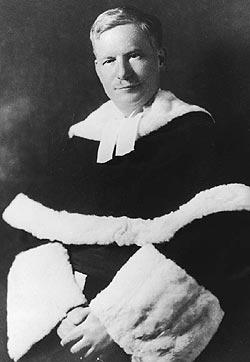

Puisne Justice of the Supreme Court of Canada
- In office January 31, 1935 – June 30, 1944
- Nominated by: Richard Bedford Bennett
- Preceded by: Robert Smith
- Succeeded by: James Wilfred Estey

9th President of the Canadian Bar Association
- In office 1936–1937
- Preceded by: G.H. Montgomery, K.C.
- Succeeded by: J.W. de B. Farris, K.C.

8th President of the Ontario Bar Association
- In office 1934–1935
- Preceded by: Dalton Lally McCarthy, K.C.
- Succeeded by: Ward Wright, K.C.

Personal details
- Born: September 10, 1885 Brockville, Ontario
- Died: June 30, 1944 (aged 58) Ottawa, Ontario
- Education: University of Toronto (BA, MA, LLB)

Henry Hague Davis (September 10, 1885 – June 30, 1944) was a Canadian lawyer and Puisne Justice of the Supreme Court of Canada.

== Early life ==
Henry Hague Davis was born in Brockville, Ontario, the son of William Henry Davis and Eliza Dowsley. He attended the University of Toronto where he received a Bachelor of Arts in 1907, a Master of Arts in 1909 and a Bachelor of Laws in 1911. He was called to the Ontario Bar in 1911 and then proceeded to practice law with the firm of Kilmer, McAndrew & Irving in Toronto in corporate law and criminal defence. In 1933, he was appointed to the Ontario Court of Appeal where he was described as being perceptive and having a "discriminating mind," and his decisions were described as "lucid and convincing."

== Justice of the Supreme Court of Canada ==
On January 31, 1935, Prime Minister R.B. Bennett appointed Davis to the Supreme Court of Canada at the age of 49. Davis filled the vacancy created by Justice Robert Smith's resignation on December 6, 1933. Snell and Vaughan note that no records explain the one-year delay in appointing Smith's replacement.

While on the Court, Davis served as commissioner investigating a longshoremen labour dispute after the Battle of Ballantyne Pier. He was also appointed to investigate allegations of improper contracting in the manufacture of Bren guns by John Inglis and Company.

Davis had been active in the Canadian Bar Association while in practice and maintained that involvement while on the Bench. He was president of the Ontario Bar Association when appointed to the Supreme Court and completed his term after his appointment. He later served as national president of the Canadian Bar Association while sitting on the Supreme Court.

Justice Davis served until his death on June 30, 1944, in Ottawa. On October 3, 1944, Prime Minister William Lyon Mackenzie King appointed Roy Kellock to fill the vacancy created by Davis' death.
