= Lawrence Arthur Dumoulin Cannon =

Canadian politician

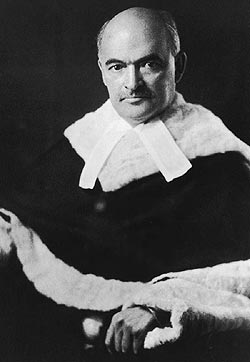

Puisne Justice of the Supreme Court of Canada
- In office January 14, 1930 – December 25, 1939
- Nominated by: William Lyon Mackenzie King
- Preceded by: Pierre-Basile Mignault
- Succeeded by: Robert Taschereau

Member of the Legislative Assembly of Quebec for Québec-Centre
- In office 1916–1923
- Preceded by: Eugène Leclerc
- Succeeded by: Pierre-Vincent Faucher

Personal details
- Born: April 28, 1877 Arthabaska, Quebec, Canada
- Died: December 25, 1939 (aged 62) Ottawa, Ontario, Canada
- Resting place: Cimetière Notre-Dame-de-Belmont
- Party: Liberal
- Spouse: Mary Corrine Fitzpatrick
- Relations: Lucien Cannon, brother
- Children: Charles-Arthur Dumoulin Cannon
- Education: Université Laval
- Profession: Lawyer

Lawrence Arthur Dumoulin Cannon (April 28, 1877 – December 25, 1939) was a Canadian lawyer, politician, and Puisne Justice of the Supreme Court of Canada.

Born in Arthabaska, Quebec, the son of Lawrence John Cannon and Aurélie Dumoulin, he received a Bachelor of Arts degree in 1896 from Université Laval. In 1899 he received an LL.L also from Université Laval. He was called to the Bar in 1899 and practised law. His brother was Lucien Cannon, a politician and cabinet minister.

In 1908, he was elected to the City council of Quebec City. In 1916, he was elected to the Legislative Assembly of Quebec for the riding of Québec-Centre as a Liberal. He was re-elected in 1919 but was defeated in 1923.

He returned to private practice until 1927, when he was appointed to the Appeal Division of the Court of King's Bench of Quebec.

== Justice of the Supreme Court of Canada ==
On January 14, 1930, Mackenzie King appointed Cannon to the Court at the age of 52 to replace Pierre-Basile Mignault, who reached the mandatory retirement age and stepped down on September 30, 1929. The appointment was delayed by Justice Minister Ernest Lapointe who hoped to appoint the new Quebec justice at the same time as the new Chief Justice of Quebec. Prior to Cannon, the position was offered to Louis St Laurent and possibly Louis Philippe Demers.

During his time on the Court, Cannon along with Justice Lamont were unhappy with the salaries of the Supreme Court which were the lowest in comparison with their counterparts in other common law jurisdictions. They both allowed their taxes to go into arrears during their time on the Court, Snell and Vaughan allude that this behaviour was a protest of low salaries.

Despite his relatively young age, Cannon's health began to fail in the late 1930s, taking leaves of absence in 1936, 1937, and 1939. Cannon died in Ottawa during his leave of absence on December 25, 1939, at the age of 62. Six weeks later on February 9, 1940, Prime Minister William Lyon Mackenzie King appointed Robert Taschereau of Quebec to take Cannon's seat.

== Personal life ==
He married Mary Corrine Fitzpatrick, the daughter of former Chief Justice of Canada Charles Fitzpatrick.

His great-nephew Lawrence Cannon was a Member of Parliament from 2006 to 2011, serving in Prime Minister Stephen Harper's cabinet.
