= Victoria Charter =

1971 proposed amendments to the Constitution of Canada

The Victoria Charter was a set of proposed amendments to the Constitution of Canada in 1971. This document represented a failed attempt on the part of Prime Minister Pierre Trudeau to patriate the Constitution, add a bill of rights to it and entrench English and French as Canada's official languages; he later succeeded in all these objectives in 1982 with the enactment of the Constitution Act, 1982.

== Content ==
The Charter would have also terminated the powers of disallowance and reservation, which remain in the Constitution. There was also a bill of rights and a new amending formula.

=== Bill of rights ===
The Victoria Charter began with the title "Part I – Political Rights", which contained nine "articles." This bill of rights, however, was not as elaborate as Canada's current constitutional bill of rights, the Canadian Charter of Rights and Freedoms.

The first article "declared" the existence of freedom of expression and freedom of religion, and like the 1960 Canadian Bill of Rights, stipulated that "all laws shall be construed and applied so as not to abrogate or abridge any such freedom." Article 2 established the applicability of the bill of rights to Parliament and the legislatures, and article 3 allowed for reasonable limits on rights (compare this to section 1 of the Charter).

Article 4 recognized the importance of the right to vote, and article 5 elaborated on this by saying the right could not be denied due to race, religion or sex. Articles 6 and 7 set the maximum duration of the House of Commons of Canada and provincial legislatures at five years (a function now assumed by section 4 of the Charter).

=== Language rights ===
Language rights were covered by Part II of the Victoria Charter. Article 10 recognized Canada's official bilingualism and article 11 allowed bilingualism in Parliament and in the legislatures of Ontario, Quebec, Nova Scotia, New Brunswick, Manitoba, Prince Edward Island and Newfoundland.

=== Judicial system ===
Parts IV and V dealt with the court system of Canada, with Part IV discussing the Supreme Court of Canada. Article 22 recognized the existence of the Supreme Court, in contrast to the Constitution Act, 1867, which merely permitted Parliament to create such a court.

Articles 24 to 33 dealt with Supreme Court appointments. Article 25 would have constitutionalized the requirement that three judges should come from Quebec, and articles 26 to 30 assigned partial responsibility of appointments to both federal and provincial justice ministers. Their choices, however, would be narrowed down and approved by a council (under article 31).

Part V was much shorter, consisting of article 43, which permitted Parliament to regulate the organization of courts.

=== Equal opportunity ===
Like section 36 of the Constitution Act, 1982, Part VII of the Victoria Charter addressed "Regional Disparities". Article 46 emphasized the values of equality of opportunity and assurances to public services. It also emphasized "economic development" to reduce regional disparities.

However, article 47 clarified that article 46 could not be used to force Parliament or the provincial legislatures to take any sort of action, and clarified article 46 would not affect the current division of powers. Thus, Part VII served to recognize values not meant to be enforced by courts.

=== Amending formula ===
The Charter set up an amending formula that would give vetoes to the federal government and the two largest provinces, Ontario and Quebec. Later, when the Canada Act 1982 was enacted, no province was given the veto, except in certain areas where unanimity is required. (The lack of veto power for Quebec was discussed and upheld by the Supreme Court in the Quebec Veto Reference.) In contrast, the Meech Lake Accord, proposed amendments in 1987–1990, would have given every province the veto in relation to certain matters.

The premier of the third largest province, British Columbia, also wanted this power, but the Victoria Charter did not recognize any veto for British Columbia. It did, however, stipulate that at least two provinces in Western Canada should approve an amendment, and that these provinces should contain half or more of the total Western population. The majority of provinces would be needed for amendments to pass, and this would also have to include two provinces in Atlantic Canada.

== Negotiations ==
The Charter failed when the premier of Quebec, Robert Bourassa, stalled and rejected it. In his Memoirs, Trudeau recalled Bourassa had slowed negotiations after all provinces had accepted the Charter. Bourassa did this by coming up with a new proposal that would give provinces supremacy over social policy, and the federal government would provide the money for such policy. Trudeau replied he could never agree to this proposal, and Bourassa retracted his approval of the Charter. Bourassa's explanation for not accepting the Charter immediately was that he would have to ask his cabinet and he was worried Quebec nationalists and students would rally against the Charter. Eventually such protests did occur.

== Legacy ==
Trudeau blamed Bourassa's rejection of the Charter for the later victory of the Parti Québécois in provincial elections in 1976 and for the Meech Lake Accord, since Bourassa had cost Quebec a constitutional veto. "Much of Bourassa's subsequent career has been spent trying to regain what he was once so unwise as to refuse," Trudeau wrote.
