= Section 4 of the Canadian Charter of Rights and Freedoms =

Constitutional provision concerning duration of Parliaments

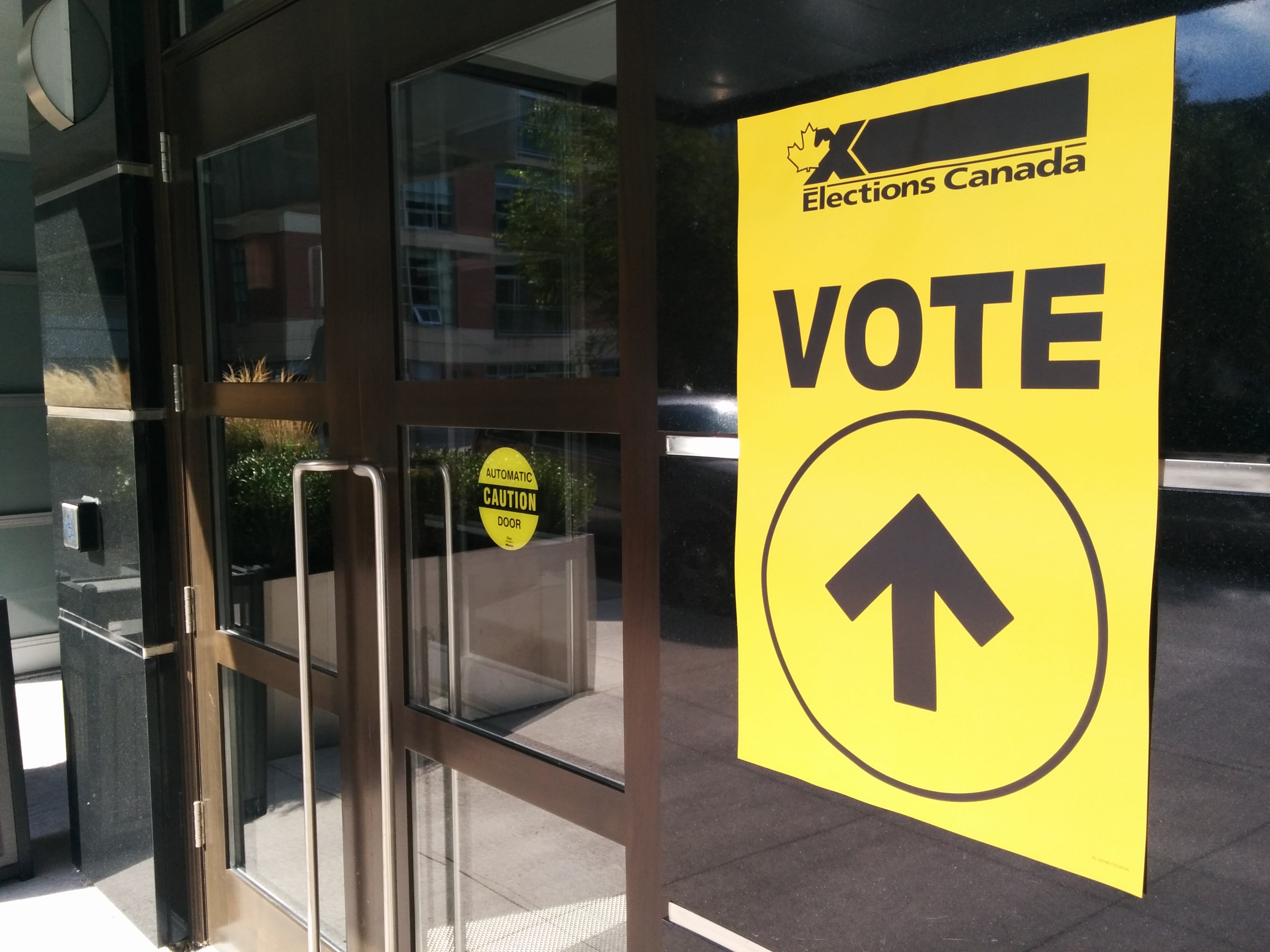
Elections must be held at least every five years under section 4.

Section 4 of the Canadian Charter of Rights and Freedoms is the second of three democratic rights sections in the Charter, enshrining a constitutional requirement for regular federal, provincial and territorial elections that cannot be arbitrarily delayed or suspended. Subsection 4(1) provides that the maximum term of the House of Commons of Canada, and of all provincial and territorial legislative assemblies, is five years. A narrow exception to this rule in case of war or rebellion is provided under subsection 4(2), but any extension would still require support of a two-thirds majority in each affected legislature.

== Text ==
The section provides that,

4(1) No House of Commons and no legislative assembly shall continue for longer than five years from the date fixed for the return of the writs at a general election of its members.
(2) In time of real or apprehended war, invasion or insurrection, a House of Commons may be continued by Parliament and a legislative assembly may be continued by the legislature beyond five years if such continuation is not opposed by the votes of more than one-third of the members of the House of Commons or the legislative assembly, as the case may be.

== Background ==
Prior to the enactment of the Charter as part of the Constitution Act, 1982, the Constitution of Canada already limited the length which the House of Commons to not more than 5 years under section 50 of the British North America Act, 1867. It reads,

50. Every House of Commons shall continue for Five Years from the Day of the Return of the Writs for choosing the House (subject to be sooner dissolved by the Governor General), and no longer.

An exception was made to the section 50 rule in 1916 so that the House of Commons in the 12th Canadian Parliament could last longer than five years due to the First World War, but this was through a one-time constitutional amendment (the British North America Act, 1916). The British North America (No. 2) Act, 1949 amended the division of powers in the Constitution Act, 1867, by adding section 91(1). This limited which portions of the constitution that the Parliament of Canada could unilaterally amend. One rule that Parliament could not unilaterally amend was that the House of Commons could not last for more than five years without an election, unless war or rebellion caused two-thirds or more of the House to believe a longer term would be necessary. It read,

... no House of Commons shall continue for more than five years from the day of the return of the Writs for choosing the House: provided, however, that a House of Commons may in time of real or apprehended war, invasion or insurrection be continued by the Parliament of Canada if such continuation is not opposed by the votes of more than one-third of the members of such House.

The five year limit was to be entrenched and extended to provincial legislatures under the bill of rights in the Victoria Charter, an unsuccessful set of constitutional amendments proposed in 1971 by Prime Minister Pierre Trudeau.

Although section 50 names the governor general as the official who may call an election early (and section 4 of the Charter does not specify an official), usually the governor general acts on the advice of the prime minister. Before and after section 4, the prime minister may advise the governor general to call an election early simply because the prime minister feels it is an opportune time, or because they may be faced with a non-confidence motion.

== Interpretation and enforcement ==
In peacetime, the Charter could theoretically allow almost six years between elections: under subsection 4(1) the House of Commons (or legislative assembly) would expire five years from the return of the writs of the previous election, and then section 5 would require an election to be called approximately nine months after that (at the latest), in order that Parliament (or the legislature) could fulfil its obligation of sitting at least once every twelve months. This interpretation is not universally accepted, but in any event the point is theoretical since no prime minister or premier has neglected or refused to request a dissolution of his or her respective Parliament or legislature prior to its "expiration" date since the Charter came into effect.

Section 4 came before the Alberta Court of Queen's Bench in 1994, in the case Atkins et al. v. City of Calgary. In Alberta, when municipal elections are held, work on proposed laws and agendas can be continued when the new municipal council meets. This is unusual, as at the federal and provincial level such legislation would expire and would have to be reintroduced. As it was argued the municipal council thus never ceases to operate even for elections, it could be considered a violation of section 4. Although municipalities are not mentioned by section 4, they are under the control of the provinces, which are bound by section 4. However, the court refused to accept that just because the municipal council was under the control of the legislative assembly, it could be considered a legislative assembly itself and was thus bound by section 4. The municipal council would rather be a creation of the legislature.

=== Fixed election dates ===
Since 2001, the federal government and all provincial and territorial governments had implemented laws specifying fixed election dates at four year intervals, though some provinces have since rescinded this.
