= Native Women's Assn of Canada v Canada =

- Supreme Court of Canada

Hearing: 4 March 1994 Judgment: 27 October 1994
- Full case name: Her Majesty The Queen v Native Women's Association of Canada, Gail Stacey-Moore and Sharon McIvor
- Citations: [1994] 3 SCR 627, 1994 CanLII 27, 119 DLR (4th) 224, [1995] 1 CNLR 47, (1994), 24 CRR (2d) 233, (1994), 84 FTR 240
- Docket No.: 23253
- Prior history: Judgment for the claimants in the Federal Court of Appeal.

Holding
- A claim to a positive obligation on the government under section 2 of the Canadian Charter of Rights and Freedoms is not supported by the evidence that an interest group's freedom of expression was not denied.

Court membership
- Chief Justice: Antonio Lamer; Puisne Justices: Gérard La Forest, Claire L'Heureux-Dubé, John Sopinka, Charles Gonthier, Peter Cory, Beverley McLachlin, Frank Iacobucci, John C. Major

Reasons given
- Majority: Sopinka J., joined by Lamer C.J., La Forest, Gonthier, Cory, Iacobucci, and Major JJ.
- Concurrence: McLachlin J.

Native Women's Assn of Canada v Canada, [1994] 3 S.C.R. 627, was a decision by the Supreme Court of Canada on section 2, section 15 and section 28 of the Canadian Charter of Rights and Freedoms, in which the Court decided against the claim that the government of Canada had an obligation to financially support an interest group in constitutional negotiations, to allow the group to speak for its people. The case resulted from negotiations for the Charlottetown Accord, in which various groups representing Aboriginal peoples in Canada were financially supported by the government, but the Native Women's Association of Canada (NWAC) was not. Since NWAC claimed the other Aboriginal groups primarily represented Aboriginal men, it argued that section 28 (sexual equality under the Charter) could be used so that section 2 (freedom of expression) required the government to provide an equal benefit to Aboriginal women, supposedly represented by NWAC.

The case could be seen as unusual, because as the Court noted, "This case does not involve the typical situation of government action restricting or interfering with freedom of expression in the negative sense" and that "the respondents are requesting the Court to consider whether there may be a positive duty on governments to facilitate expression in certain circumstances."

== Background ==
During negotiations for the Charlottetown Accord, there was discussion of enhancing Aboriginal self-government in Canada, and entrenching this new order of government in the Constitution of Canada. Four Aboriginal interest groups participated in the discussions with financial support from the government, namely the Assembly of First Nations (AFN), the Native Council of Canada (NCC), the Métis National Council (MNC) and the Inuit Tapirisat of Canada (ITC). NWAC was not an equal partner among these participants, but some of the money trickled down to this group because it was decided that some of the government money should be spent on discussing women's rights in the Aboriginal community. In some cases, NWAC was left out of certain meetings altogether. They claimed that their aim was to make sure the new Aboriginal self-governments would respect women's Charter rights, and that the other Aboriginal groups primarily represented Aboriginal men.

Upon reviewing the case, the Federal Court of Appeal ruled that the treatment of NWAC might indeed infringe section 2 of the Charter.

It was the first major freedom of expression case brought by Aboriginal litigants.

== Decision ==
The Supreme Court majority, represented by John Sopinka, did not share the view of the Federal Court of Appeal and ruled against the rights claimants. The Court did, however, reject the government's argument that the Charter was not applicable at all. The government had said that if NWAC was excluded from the discussions, it was the fault of the AFN, NCC, ITC and MNC, since they did not share their funds more equally, and the Charter does not apply to these Aboriginal groups but only to the government itself. As the Court noted, it was to whom the government itself gave its money to that was the real issue.

Nevertheless, in its discussion of sections 2 and 28, the Court found in favour of the government. The Court followed its precedent in Irwin Toy Ltd. v. Quebec (Attorney General) to find that discussing constitutional issues with the government is "unquestionably" a form of expression, of the kind referred to in section 2. However, the government did not seem to be guilty of suppressing this expression, which Irwin Toy also requires for the section 2 claim to succeed. The question, then, was whether the consequence of the government's actions was to limit Aboriginal women's free speech, even though the government had seemed to want a discussion, and whether section 28 was infringed when the groups claimed to primarily represent Aboriginal men were given more opportunity to expression than NWAC. In making this claim, NWAC acknowledged that the government was not required by section 2 to provide this type of financial support in ordinary circumstances, but since the government had agreed to support the other groups, the support for interest groups should be fair and equal.

The Court considered the case Haig v. Canada, which had also seen some positive claims under section 2 in relation to the Charlottetown Accord. NWAC believed Haig dictated that if expression were to be supported by the government, it should be fair and the Charter should apply, and that section 28 reinforced NWAC's claim. The Court, however, argued that firstly, funding for diverse groups could not be the rule with every governmental study, or "the ramifications on government spending would be far reaching indeed." They also quoted a United States Supreme Court free speech case, in which it was noted that the government is engaged in many studies and does much, and if the Constitution was applied to make sure everyone is represented in the process, the process would be slow. If positive obligations under section 2 are rare, then, the Court noted that it was never actually proven that the AFN, NCC, ITC and MNC represent Aboriginal men over Aboriginal women, or that these groups were pushing for self-governments that would favour Aboriginal men. The ITC, for example, not only denied that the ITC represented Inuit men above women, but that NWAC itself did not represent Inuit women, as this was the role of the group Pauktuutit. The Court also believed that the AFN, NCC, ITC and MNC could carry NWAC's concerns to the discussions.

The Court briefly dismissed challenges under section 15, as these were closely related to those under section 2. Indeed, the Court wrote that NWAC's "contentions regarding ss. 2(b) and 28 of the Charter are better characterized as a s. 15 Charter argument." The Court also briefly dismissed claims under section 35 of the Constitution Act, 1982, which entrenches Aboriginal rights equally for men and women. As the Court noted, there is no Aboriginal right or treaty right to debate constitutional reform.

== Concurrences ==
=== Concurrence by L'Heureux-Dube ===
A separate concurrence was written by Justice Claire L'Heureux-Dube, who disagreed on how the case Haig v. Canada was interpreted. As she specified, the Haig decision established there is no right to vote in a referendum under the Charter; this does not mean, however, that it will be unusual that the government be bound by the Charter when it supports expression in other circumstances. The reason why L'Heureux-Dube otherwise supported Sopinka's decision was that she agreed that in this case, NWAC's expression was not suppressed, although NWAC did not receive the treatment it would have preferred.

=== Concurrence by McLachlin ===
Justice Beverley McLachlin also gave a separate concurrence, in which she wrote that "the freedom of governments to choose and fund their advisors on matters of policy is not constrained by the Canadian Charter of Rights and Freedoms" and that these "policy consultations" are different from voting, which Haig was concerned with.

== Legacy ==
The National Association of Women and the Law noted in 2000 that the decision "does not indicate a substantive judicial awareness of women's political interests."

== See also ==
- Gender equality
- List of gender equality lawsuits
