= Section 1 =

Section 1 may refer to:

- Section 1 of the Canadian Charter of Rights and Freedoms
- Section 1 of the Constitution of Australia
- Section 1 of the Constitution Act, 1867, Canada
- Internal Revenue Code section 1 in the United States
- Section 1 of the Indian Penal Code, defining the territorial jurisdiction of the criminal code
- Section 1 (NYSPHSAA), the southern Hudson Valley section of the New York State Public High School Athletic Association, U.S.
- Section 1, a joint venture label of Partisan Records

== See also ==
- MI1, or British Military Intelligence, Section 1
