= Section 16.1 of the Canadian Charter of Rights and Freedoms =

Linguistic equality in New Brunswick

The province of New Brunswick (red), where section 16.1 applies.

Section 16.1 of the Canadian Charter of Rights and Freedoms guarantees equality between English-speaking and French-speaking residents of New Brunswick. Enacted in 1993, it is the most recent addition to the Charter.

Section 16.1 (pronounced "sixteen point one") is not to be confused with subsection 16(1) ("sixteen one"), which is part of section 16 and was part of the original 1982 text. Section 16.1 is a separate section; the "point one" numbering indicates that this new section was added between two existing sections without renumbering them.

== Text ==
The section reads,

16.1 (1) The English linguistic community and the French linguistic community in New Brunswick have equality of status and equal rights and privileges, including the right to distinct educational institutions and such distinct cultural institutions as are necessary for the preservation and promotion of those communities.
(2) The role of the legislature and government of New Brunswick to preserve and promote the status, rights and privileges referred to subsection (1) is affirmed.

== Purpose ==
Section 16.1 makes reference to a need for institutions for both language groups, including educational institutions, and it seemingly gives the provincial government powers to protect the right. This is not completely revolutionary in that this merely entrenches laws already found in An Act Recognizing the Equality of the Two Official Linguistic Communities in New Brunswick (1981), as noted in the 2001 Court of Appeal case Charlebois v. Mowat. The section can be seen as providing "collective rights," and one critic charged that a deeper meaning to the section would have to be decided by Canadian courts.

In Charlebois v. Mowat, the court ruled that section 16.1, as well as subsections 16(2) and 18(2), require bilingual municipal laws when the minority language population of a municipality is significant. The ruling was made primarily on the basis of the court's interpretation of subsection 18(2)), but in its ruling the court also stated that section 16.1 is "remedial", meaning that it is supposed to fix historical problems. (A related case later went to the Supreme Court as Charlebois v. Saint John (City).)

== History ==
An Act Recognizing the Equality of the Two Official Linguistic Communities in New Brunswick was enacted in 1981 by Premier Richard Hatfield. It provided independent school boards for both linguistic groups. Its principles were later incorporated into the Constitution of Canada, through section 16.1, in response to a shift in provincial politics in the early 1990s.

Whereas in the 1980s all parties had supported the rise of bilingualism in New Brunswick, in 1991 a new party called the Confederation of Regions Party, which was opposed to official bilingualism, became the official opposition in the legislature. The pro-bilingualism Liberal provincial government proceeded to seek a constitutional amendment mandating bilingualism in New Brunswick to make any future change in New Brunswick's status subject to Federal approval.

The constitutionalization of the legislation was originally meant to be accomplished as part of a package of amendments known as the Charlottetown Accord in 1992. The amendment was made separately once the Accord was rejected in a national referendum, prompting Professor Peter Russell to refer to this as an "encouraging [sign] that Canadians may be recovering the capacity to accomplish constitutional reform without linking everything together and getting bogged down in the mega constitutional swamp."

Section 43 of the Constitution Act, 1982 was the part of the amending formula used to add section 16.1 to the Charter. This meant the amendment was approved by the province affected (New Brunswick) and the Senate of Canada and House of Commons of Canada, although constitutional lawyer Deborah Coyne argued that the amendment involved federal jurisdiction and thus seven provinces would be needed. The House of Commons passed the amendment with a vote of 219-2, on February 1, 1993.

A Montreal Gazette article approved, calling the New Brunswick government "courageous" because of its resistance to the Confederation of Regions Party, and added that the section provided a "noble, generous vision of Canadian duality and co-existence. Too bad it seems confined to New Brunswick."

It did attract some criticism, with columnist William Johnson claiming that Parliament had not fully analyzed the amendment and tried to stifle public discussion. He even suggested that section 16.1 might create two governments for New Brunswick, one in English and one in French. Earlier, this columnist had also charged that enshrining collective rights in the Constitution was "alien to liberalism," and would undermine the individual in favour of a larger group; he also said section 16.1 excluded Aboriginal peoples in New Brunswick and could make them "second-class citizens." He compared section 16.1 to how the Meech Lake Accord and Charlottetown Accord would have recognized Quebec as a distinct society.

However, Opposition leader Jean Chrétien, who at that time represented Acadians, said that "For me it is a great day. It is an example that we can be together and at the same time be different in Canada."

=== Proclamation ===
The Constitution Amendment, 1993 (New Brunswick) was signed by Prime Minister Brian Mulroney, Attorney General Pierre Blais, and Registrar General Pierre H. Vincent, under a proclamation of Governor General Ray Hnatyshyn in Ottawa on 12 March 1993.

== Influence outside New Brunswick ==
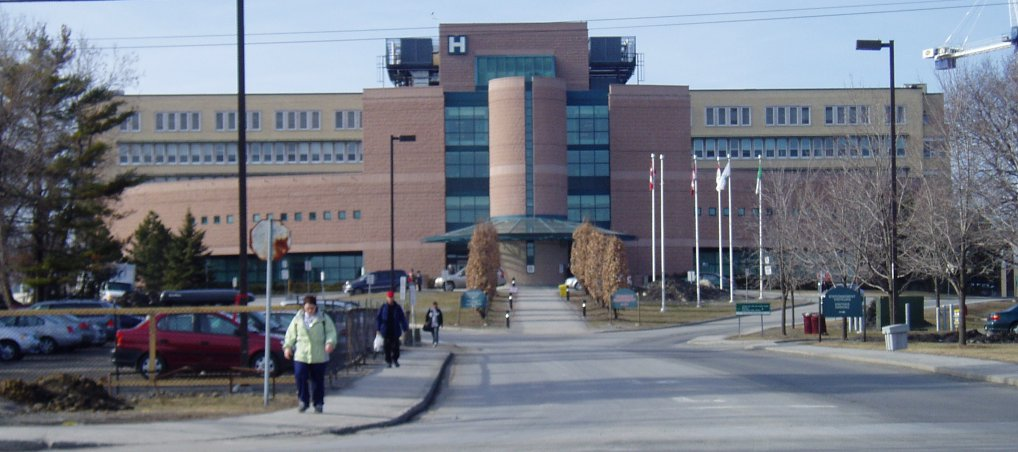
Montfort Hospital.

In 2000, an Ontario court ruled that the province was legally obligated to keep from closing the Montfort Hospital as part of its program of merging many of the hospitals in the Ottawa region. The basis for the decision was the court's conclusion that this was a logical application of an unwritten constitutional principle of minority rights, which had been found by the Supreme Court in the 1998 Reference re Secession of Quebec. Since the Montfort Hospital was the only hospital in the region operating primarily in French, it amounted to a protected parallel service-provider, much as New Brunswick's French-language and English-language school systems are parallel service providers, and therefore as an essential component of the collective rights of Ottawa's Franco-Ontarian population. The Government of Ontario criticized the decision as judicial activism, and charged that "The divisional court decision has effectively rewritten the constitution to make [Section] 16.1 applicable to Ontario despite the express intention that it apply to New Brunswick alone."
