= Section 28 (disambiguation) =

Section 28 may refer to:

- Section 28, a former law in England, Wales and Scotland regarding homosexuality
- Section 28 of the Canadian Charter of Rights and Freedoms
- Section 28 of the Constitution of Australia
- Section 28 of the Indian Penal Code, definition of "counterfeit"
- Section 28 of the Youth Justice and Criminal Evidence Act 1999, referring to video recorded cross-examination
