= Constitution of 1982 =

Constitution of 1982 may refer to:

- Constitution Act, 1982, Canada
- 1982 Constitution of the People's Republic of China
- Turkish Constitution of 1982
