= Section 28 of the Canadian Charter of Rights and Freedoms =

Constitutional protection of sexual equality

Section 28 of the Canadian Charter of Rights and Freedoms is a part of the Constitution of Canada. It does not contain a right so much as it provides a guide as to how to interpret rights in the Charter. Specifically, section 28 addresses concerns of sexual equality, and was modelled after the proposed Equal Rights Amendment in the United States.

== Text ==
The section reads:

28. Notwithstanding anything in this Charter, the rights and freedoms referred to in it are guaranteed equally to male and female persons.

== Interpretation ==
Section 28 is not so much a right because it does not state that men and women are equal; this is done by section 15. Instead, section 28 ensures that men and women have equal claim to rights listed in the Charter. Section 28 can be more beneficial to women in that the section 33 notwithstanding clause can be used to nullify women's section 15 rights, but not to impair the operation of section 28. Constitutional scholar Peter Hogg has even speculated that section 28 cannot be limited by a section 1 test, given that section 28 is supposed to operate "notwithstanding" other Charter provisions. Nevertheless, in the judicial decision Blainey v. Ontario Hockey Association et al. (1986), it was found that section 28 should have limits of some sort, or it would threaten "public decency" and affirmative action meant to aid women.

In the case Native Women's Association of Canada v. Canada (1994), the Court considered and rejected the argument that section 28 could reinforce section 2 of the Charter (freedom of expression) so that a women's interest group could receive equal benefits as other Aboriginal interest groups in constitutional negotiations, as the other groups had received government money to discuss their concerns. While the Court acknowledged that discussing issues in constitutional negotiations is a matter of expression, there was no evidence that Aboriginal women received lesser rights, as the favoured groups supposedly represented both Aboriginal men and women.

=== Alternative interpretations ===
The standard conservative reading of section 28 came as a disappointment to feminists. As the Canadian Advisory Council on the Status of Women noted, many of the feminists who pushed for having section 28 in the Charter hoped that it would not just be read literally but would also "provide a social and historical context in which women's claims can be better understood"; it existed to remind judges charged with enforcing the Charter that women had been "recognized as 'persons'" and had gained more equality in marriage. This would, in turn, hopefully strengthen women's rights in section 15, which feminists felt was needed after having been disappointed by pre-Charter women's rights case law. In fact, in the British Columbia Court of Appeal case R. v. Red Hot Video (1985), some judges did refer to section 28 to say that laws against allegedly sexist obscenity could be upheld; section 28 could have a role to play in a section 1 test upholding laws against obscenity. This line of thinking, however, has had little influence since.

== Aboriginal rights ==
It has been argued that section 28 can ensure that Aboriginal and treaty rights be guaranteed equally to Aboriginal men and women. On the one hand, section 28 might be seen as ensuring only rights guaranteed by the Charter are held equally by men and women. In this case section 28 is inapplicable to Aboriginal rights, since Aboriginal rights are protected by section 35 of the Constitution Act, 1982 rather than the Charter (which constitutes sections 1-34 of the Constitution Act, 1982). However, while the Charter does not guarantee Aboriginal rights, section 25 does mention Aboriginal rights. The wording of section 28 mentions "the rights and freedoms referred to" by the Charter, not "rights and freedoms guaranteed" by the Charter. Since Aboriginal rights are referred to by section 25, section 28 may be applicable. While section 25 states that Aboriginal rights should not be limited by the Charter, this may be trumped by section 28's opening words, "Notwithstanding anything in this Charter..."

In 1983, section 35 was amended to add a clause similar to section 28. It states that "Notwithstanding any other provision of this Act, the aboriginal and treaty rights referred to in subsection (1) are guaranteed equally to male and female persons." Thus, for consistency it makes sense that section 28 applies to section 25, since a sex equality interpretation explicitly applies to section 35.

== History ==
Earlier efforts by feminist organizations and the Advisory Council on the Status of Women to include more sex equality in the Charter were met with lack of cooperation from Ottawa, leading to Chatelaine magazine editor Doris Anderson resigning from her position in the negotiations. In February and March 1981, 1,300 women came to Ottawa to stage demonstrations in favour of more sexual equality guarantees in the Charter. The content of section 28 thus first appeared in the April 1981 draft of the Charter, but in November it had to be diluted to placate Saskatchewan premier Allan Blakeney. Section 33 could now limit section 28, as Blakeney argued the section would otherwise endanger the traditional supremacy of elected bodies. In his memoirs, Jean Chrétien, Attorney General of Canada during the Charter negotiations, stated that the dilution was not very problematic because he expected women's protests would convince Saskatchewan to drop the issue. This is indeed what happened; one of the most vocal leaders of the protest against Blakeney's move was Anderson.
