= Canadian Advisory Council on the Status of Women =

The Canadian Advisory Council on the Status of Women (CACSW) emerged from the recommendation of the Royal Commission on the Status of Women (RCSW). The CACSW was established by the Canadian federal government in 1973 in order to educate and inform the public about women's concerns. The CACSW was also empowered with the task of advising the federal government as to the effect public policy had on women. Such direct access to government was significant in that it legitimized women's issues in large-P politics.

The economic boom of the 1960s ensured that fiscal resources were available to support groups such as the CACSW. Additionally, global activist movements fostered an appropriate cultural environment for the acknowledgement of rights at the state level. Both these factors mitigated the process of discourse on women's issues with prominent political actors. As such, the CACSW was empowered with influencing the government agenda on subjects related to the feminist struggle, including: wage equity, access to employment traditionally dominated by men, education, female reproduction, child care, maternity benefits, and political representation.

== CACSW and the feminist movement ==
An argument can be advanced that the creation of the CACSW was the government's response to the second wave of feminism in Canadian society. Following the suffrage movement of the first wave of feminism, the second wave ultimately challenged the patriarchal norms which delegated women to their primary role of wife/mother, and that any additional roles, such as wage earning, was perceived as secondary to that primary role (and therefore, less important).

== The 1982 Charter of Rights and Freedoms ==
Prime Minister Trudeau recognized the need to entrench basic rights into the constitution. However, prior to 1982, the constitution was still under the mandate of the British Parliament. His attempt to repatriate the constitution was met with hostility from the provinces. As such, interest groups within Canadian society viewed provincial governments as unsympathetic to equality rights, and therefore much public support was garnered for the repatriation of the constitution by the federal government. Under the presidency of Doris Hilda Anderson, the CACSW championed the explicit inclusion of women's equality in the Charter of Rights and Freedoms. The result of the active mobilization of women's groups, such as CACSW, resulted in the entrenchment of two separate provisions, Section 15 (equality rights) and Section 28 (gender equality provision), in the Canadian Constitution Act of 1982.
