= Section 19 of the Canadian Charter of Rights and Freedoms =

Constitutional right to use English or French in federal courts

Section 19 of the Canadian Charter of Rights and Freedoms is one of the provisions of the Constitution of Canada that addresses rights relating to Canada's two official languages, English and French. Like section 133 of the Constitution Act, 1867, section 19 allows anyone to speak English or French in federal courts. However, only section 133 extends these rights to Quebec courts, while section 19 extends these rights to courts in New Brunswick. New Brunswick is the only officially bilingual province under section 16 of the Charter.

== Text ==
Section 19 reads,

19(1) Either English or French may be used by any person in, or in any pleading in or process issuing from, any court established by Parliament.
(2) Either English or French may be used by any person in, or in any pleading in or process issuing from, any court of New Brunswick.

Section 19 is based on rights in section 133 of the Constitution Act, 1867. Section 133 provides that "either of those Languages may be used by any Person or in any Pleading or Process in or issuing from any Court of Canada established under this Act, and in or from all or any of the Courts of Quebec." However, unlike section 133, section 19(2) extends these rights to courts in New Brunswick. This was not entirely new, as section 13(1) of the Official Languages of New Brunswick Act (1973) provided for statutory language rights in New Brunswick courts. Still, the wording of section 19(2) follows section 133 more closely than section 13(1). In the 1986 Supreme Court case Société des Acadiens v. Association of Parents, Justice Jean Beetz found this to be significant. Since section 133 rights are limited, constitutional language rights in New Brunswick courts are more limited than rights under section 13(1).

Section 13(1) reads,

13(1). Subject to section 15, in any proceeding before a court, any person appearing or giving evidence may be heard in the official language of his choice and such choice is not to place that person at any disadvantage.

Under section 23 of the Manitoba Act, people in Manitoba courts have rights similar to those in section 133. Hence, New Brunswick, Manitoba, and Quebec are the only provinces whose court systems constitutionally must provide such rights.

Section 19(2) was controversial when the Charter was being negotiated. The Barristers' Society of New Brunswick considered the proposed provision and argued that over 90% of New Brunswick lawyers spoke only English and the section might emphasize the language of lawyers more so than their clients.

== Interpretation ==
In Société des Acadiens, Justice Beetz ruled that section 19 of the Charter and section 133 of the Constitution Act, 1867 established a right to speak in either English or French. However, neither section went so far as to guarantee a person speaking in either English or French would be understood by the judge or judges. Under these sections it would be possible for a judge who understood only one of the two languages to preside over a case in which someone chose to speak the other language. Beetz did not want such a situation, however, and felt that the right to be understood was protected by basic principles of fundamental justice found in sections 7 and 14 of the Charter. Since this is a right established under fundamental justice and not the official language provisions, it was a right belonging to anyone regardless of whether they speak English, French or a non-official language. This interpretation was influenced by past interpretations of section 133, including the interpretation of similar language rights in the Parliament of Canada found in section 133 and section 17 of the Charter.

This interpretation of section 19 has been disputed. In the same case, Chief Justice Brian Dickson and Justice Bertha Wilson both found that a right to be understood by a judge regardless of whether one chooses to speak English or French could be found in the penumbra of section 19.

However, the restrictive interpretation of language rights in Société des Acadiens was largely overturned in R. v. Beaulac.
