= Section 34 of the Canadian Charter of Rights and Freedoms =

Provision of the Canadian Constitution

Section 34 of the Canadian Charter of Rights and Freedoms is the last section of Canada's Charter of Rights, which is entrenched in the Constitution Act, 1982. Section 34 provides guidance for the legal citation of the Charter.

The section has been interpreted by Canadian writers, who have analyzed both its intention and its meaning. Because the section affirms the name of the Charter and thus entrenches it in the Constitution Act, it came into focus in 1994 when a Member of Parliament (MP) proposed to change the name of the Charter.

== Text ==
Under the heading "Citation," the section reads:

34. This Part may be cited as the Canadian Charter of Rights and Freedoms.

== Function ==
Section 34, as part of the Constitution Act, 1982, came into force on April 17, 1982. According to the government of Canada, section 34's function "simply" relates to citation. The section clarifies that the first 34 sections of the Constitution Act, 1982 may be collectively called the "Canadian Charter of Rights and Freedoms," which is an "official name." This would be the name of the English version. The French version of section 34 states "Titre de la présente partie: Charte canadienne des droits et libertés."

In 1982, constitutional scholar Peter Hogg suggested that the section also clarifies the size and scope of the Charter. Only section 34 and the sections that come before it compose the Charter. The next sections of the Constitution Act, 1982, including section 35 (which affirms Aboriginal rights) and section 36 (which affirms equalization payments), are thus not Charter rights. This is significant, since section 1 of the Constitution Act, 1982 allows for limits on Charter rights, so it cannot apply to sections 35 or 36. However, this also means that a "judicial remedy" under section 24 of the Act is not available for sections 35 or 36, since section 24 refers only to the Charter.

== Discussion ==
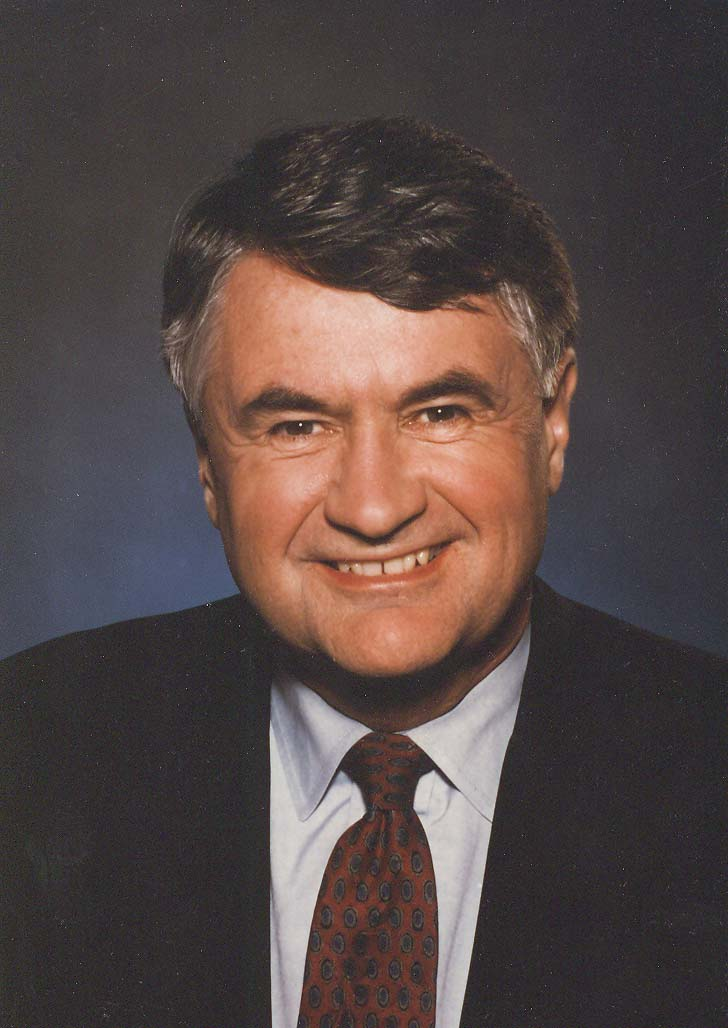
Parliamentary Secretary Russell MacLellan argued against amending section 34 in 1994.

Canadian poet George Elliott Clarke once analyzed section 34, calling it "bland legalese." He wrote it was "reassuring" because it was dull, signalling neither fear nor excitement. Thus, it seemed to imply the Charter of Rights was not a radical constitutional change, despite the fact that it was potentially revolutionary for a constitutional monarchy. In considering the name Canadian Charter of Rights and Freedoms, Clarke felt the first word, "Canadian," hinted at Canadian nationalism. He then compared this to the French Declaration of the Rights of Man and of the Citizen and the United States Bill of Rights, saying that those documents were written by men who had just emerged from conflict and still remembered it, and thus Canada could be duller. However, he noted there was some drama in the Charter in that it was written when there was a threat of Quebec separatism, and section 27 (multiculturalism), section 25 (Aboriginal rights), and section 15(2) (affirmative action) of the Charter could change the country.

In 1994, the House of Commons of Canada debated changing the name of the Canadian Charter of Rights and Freedoms to the Canadian Charter of Rights, Freedoms and Responsibilities. As Parliamentary Secretary Russell MacLellan pointed out, this would have to be done through a constitutional amendment, particularly to section 34, since section 34 "establishes the charter's title. The charter's title is thus part of the Constitution." MacLellan believed the amending formula needed would be the one requiring the support of seven provincial governments representing at least half of Canada's population. Edmonton Southwest MP Ian McClelland had suggested the change, believing it to be necessary because "I felt we were becoming a nation of entitlement." MacLellan replied that "The Canadian Charter of Rights and Freedoms is and aspires to be a statement by Canadians about the rights and freedoms which we as Canadians deeply value in our democratic society." MacLellan added that section 1 implied a need for responsibilities, so "It is not necessary to change the title of this charter to emphasize the integral relationship between the individual's rights and his or her responsibility to the rest of society."
