= Section 1 of the Constitution Act, 1867 =

Provision of the Constitution of Canada

British North America Act, 1867

Section 1 of the Constitution Act, 1867 (French: article 1 de la Loi constitutionnelle de 1867) is a provision of the Constitution of Canada, setting out the title to the Act.

The Constitution Act, 1867 is the constitutional statute which established Canada. Originally named the British North America Act, 1867, the Act continues to be the foundational statute for the Constitution of Canada, although it has been amended many times since 1867. It is now recognised as part of the supreme law of Canada.

== Constitution Act, 1867 ==
The Constitution Act, 1867 is part of the Constitution of Canada and thus part of the supreme law of Canada. The Act sets out the constitutional framework of Canada, including the structure of the federal government and the powers of the federal government and the provinces. It was the product of extensive negotiations between the provinces of British North America at the Charlottetown Conference in 1864, the Quebec Conference in 1864, and the London Conference in 1866. Those conferences were followed by consultations with the British government in 1867. The Act was then enacted by the British Parliament under the name the British North America Act, 1867. In 1982 the Act was brought under full Canadian control through the Patriation of the Constitution, and was renamed the Constitution Act, 1867. Since Patriation the Act can only be amended in Canada, under the amending formula set out in the Constitution Act, 1982.

== Text of section 1 ==
Section 1 reads:

Short title
1 This Act may be cited as the Constitution Act, 1867.

Section 1 is found in Part I of the Constitution Act, 1867, dealing with preliminary matters. It has been amended once, in 1982.

== Legislative history ==
Section 1 is a typical example of a short title used by British and Canadian legislative drafters. It was not used in either the Quebec Resolutions of 1864, nor the London Resolutions of 1866.

The original name of the Act was the British North America Act, 1867, which appeared in the first formal draft of the bill dated January 23, 1867, and was used in all subsequent drafts, up to the introduction of the bill in the British Parliament. The short title was presumably introduced by the British legislative drafter responsible for the bill, Francis S. Reilly.

Section 1 has been amended once since the Act was enacted in 1867. The name of the Act was changed to the Constitution Act, 1867 upon the Patriation of the Constitution in 1982.

== Purpose and interpretation ==
The original name, the British North America Act, 1867, reflected the colonial origins of the statute. It was enacted by the British Parliament in the mid-19th century, when the colonies of British North America were part of the British Empire. The name was changed to Constitution Act, 1867 as part of the Patriation process, to modernise the Constitution of Canada.

The short title of a statute is generally used for citing the statute, rather than the longer full title. The long title is sometimes used by a court as an aid to interpretation. Both titles are equally authoritative.

== Related provisions of the Constitution Act, 1867 ==
The formal long title of the Act is: An Act for the Union of Canada, Nova Scotia, and New Brunswick, and the Government thereof; and for Purposes connected therewith.
