= Section 18 of the Canadian Charter of Rights and Freedoms =

Constitutional requirement that laws be in English and French

Section 18 of the Canadian Charter of Rights and Freedoms is one of the provisions of the Constitution that addresses rights relating to Canada's two official languages, English and French. Like section 133 of the Constitution Act, 1867, section 18 requires that all statutes and other records made by the Parliament of Canada must be available in both official languages. Section 133 places a similar obligation on the legislature of Quebec, and this is reaffirmed by section 21 of the Charter. Section 18 of the Charter places a similar obligation on the legislature of New Brunswick. New Brunswick is the only officially bilingual province under section 16 of the Charter.

== Text ==
Section 18 reads,

18.(1) The statutes, records and journals of Parliament shall be printed and published in English and French and both language versions are equally authoritative.
(2) The statutes, records and journals of the legislature of New Brunswick shall be printed and published in English and French and both language versions are equally authoritative.

== Application ==
Justice Michel Bastarache and fellow-authors wrote of section 18 that it repeats section 133 in necessitating Parliament's statutes being kept in both official languages, and that section 18 "adds that both versions are equally authoritative." They compared this clause to sections 56 and 57 of the Constitution Act, 1982, which state that English and French versions of the Constitution are equal. Earlier, however, court decisions suggested the equal status of English and French versions was implicit in section 133. Bastarache and his fellow-authors also argued that section 18 implies bilingualism is to be used in the making of the law, and state that failure to satisfy section 18 means any laws are unconstitutional.

== Challenges ==
Section 18 causes a number of challenges in law making. Someone translating a law from one official language to another will have to ensure that the two versions do not contradict one another. Hence, the federal government has tried to ensure laws are written in both English and French to begin with, as opposed to the usual method in which laws written in English would then be translated to French.

If the two versions of a law contradict each other anyway, the equality under section 18 causes courts to interpret them by means of "cross-interpretation," which means the courts interpret both while referencing the other. An interpretation that most plausibly could apply to both of the two contradictory versions will be adopted. Additionally, the purpose of the law may be considered, so that the version most geared toward the purpose will be applied. In some cases, one version of a law that is more explicit than the other will receive priority.

== Interpretation ==
In the 1986 Supreme Court case Société des Acadiens v. Association of Parents, Justice Jean Beetz commented on section 18. He called it one of the few language rights in the Charter, along with section 20, that is meant to promote discussion that everyone is able to understand. Section 20 addresses public services, while Beetz noted section 18 "provides for bilingualism at the legislative level."

The New Brunswick Court of Appeal considered subsection 18(2), which requires bilingual statutes and records to be kept by the provincial legislature, for the first time in the 2001 case Charlebois v. Mowat. The court extended subsection 18(2)'s requirement to municipal laws, with reference to sections 16 and section 16.1 of the Charter. Although the Supreme Court had said in Quebec (Attorney General) v. Blaikie (No. 2) (1981) that the section 133 requirements of the Quebec legislature do not extend to Quebec municipalities, the New Brunswick court observed section 133 and the Charter are separate laws enacted for different purposes. According to R. v. Beaulac (1999), the Charter rights should be interpreted more liberally. The Charter rights should support minority language groups. Legislation was defined as laws applying to people, and municipal laws fit this description. Finally, it was noted that municipalities exist under the authority of the provincial governments, which are bound by the Charter under section 32. (A related case later went to the Supreme Court as Charlebois v. Saint John (City).)
