= Section 5 of the Canadian Charter of Rights and Freedoms =

Constitutional provision requiring annual sittings of Parliament

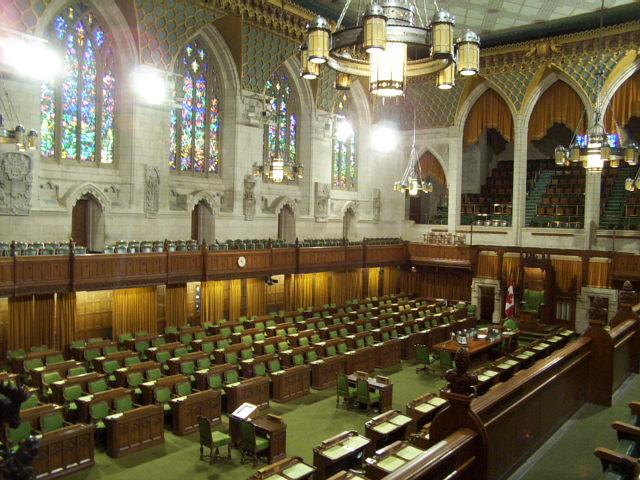
Under section 5, a sitting of the Parliament of Canada must be held at least once every year.

Section 5 of the Canadian Charter of Rights and Freedoms is a part of the Constitution of Canada, and the last of three democratic rights in the Charter. Its role is to establish a rule regarding how frequently the Parliament of Canada and the legislatures of the provinces and territories of Canada must meet. This section is thus meant to reflect and constitutionally guarantee a "basic democratic principle" that "a government must explain its actions to the people."

The section reads,

5. There shall be a sitting of Parliament and of each legislature at least once every twelve months.

== Function ==
Section 5 guarantees that, since Parliament and each legislature must sit at least once a year, Members of Parliament and Members of the Legislative Assemblies may raise concerns or inquiries or challenge government policies (such as in Question Period).

This right did not exist in the Canadian Bill of Rights. Insofar as the Parliament of Canada is concerned, section 5 instead replaced section 20 of the Constitution Act, 1867, which had read:

20. There shall be a Session of the Parliament of Canada once at least in every Year, so that Twelve Months shall not intervene between the last Sitting of the Parliament in one Session and its first Sitting in the next Session.

When the Charter came into force in 1982 as part of the Constitution Act, 1982, section 53 of the Constitution Act, 1982 repealed section 20 of the Constitution Act, 1867. The difference was that section 5 merely requires a sitting of Parliament at least once a year, whereas section 20 had required not only a sitting but also a session of Parliament every year. Every session must begin with a Speech from the Throne, and moreover, bills that had not been passed when a session comes to a close must be introduced again, after a new session is initiated, if it is still desired to become law. Hence, governments sometimes prefer that sessions last longer than the twelve months that had been prescribed by the Constitution Act, 1867. Writing in 2000, political scientist Rand Dyck observed that while sessions even now usually last a year, they "often spilled over to two or even three years." Even before 1982, governments sometimes extended session lengths to give more time to parliamentary committees to work, even though the House of Commons of Canada and Senate of Canada would stop working.

As far as the province of Manitoba is concerned, section 5 of the Charter replaced section 20 of the Manitoba Act, which was also repealed in 1982. Section 5 still co-exists with section 86 of the Constitution Act, 1867, which requires annual sessions for the legislatures of the provinces of Ontario and Quebec.

== Enforcement ==
There are no examples in Canadian history at either the federal or provincial level of cabinets ruling without consulting Parliament or their respective legislature at least once a year. If it were to happen, Professor Gérald-A. Beaudoin wrote in 1982 that section 5 would not allow courts to take any remedial action besides ruling the government's refusal to let a legislature sit is inappropriate. If it were necessary to resolve the problem, the only lawful remedy would be for the Governor General of Canada or Lieutenant Governor to appoint a new government and new prime minister or Premier.
