= Dialogue principle =

In Canadian constitutional law, the dialogue principle is an approach to the interpretation of the Canadian Charter of Rights and Freedoms where judicial review of legislation is said to be part of a "dialogue" between the legislatures and the courts. It specifically involves governments drafting legislation in response to court rulings and courts acknowledging the effort if the new legislation is challenged.

This approach was introduced by constitutional scholars Peter Hogg and Allison Bushell, and has had acceptance in much of the academic world and in courts. Nevertheless, it remains a controversial principle as it attempts to justify what many critics see as judicial activism in the courts.
