= Canadian Charter of Rights and Freedoms =

1982 Canadian constitutional legislation

- English language version of the Charter
- Created: 1982
- Purpose: To protect the rights and freedoms of all Canadians

Full text
- Canadian Charter of Rights and Freedoms at Wikisource

The Canadian Charter of Rights and Freedoms (French: Charte canadienne des droits et libertés), often simply referred to as the Charter in Canada, is a bill of rights entrenched in the Constitution of Canada, forming the first part of the Constitution Act, 1982. The Charter guarantees certain political rights to Canadian citizens and guarantees the civil rights of everyone in Canada. It is designed to unify Canadians around a set of principles that embody those rights. The Charter was proclaimed in force by Queen Elizabeth II of Canada on April 17, 1982, as part of the Constitution Act, 1982.

The Charter was preceded by the Canadian Bill of Rights, enacted in 1960, which was a federal statute rather than a constitutional document. The Bill of Rights exemplified an international trend towards formalizing human rights protections following the United Nations' Universal Declaration of Human Rights, instigated by the country's movement for human rights and freedoms that emerged after World War II. As a federal statute, the Bill of Rights could be amended through the ordinary legislative process and had no application to provincial laws. The Supreme Court of Canada also narrowly interpreted the Bill of Rights, showing reluctance to declare laws inoperative. (Note: R. v. Drybones (1969), [1970] S.C.R. 282—the one and only federal law declared inoperative by the Supreme Court based on the Bill of Rights. See: Canada (AG) v. Lavell, [1974] S.C.R. 1349—example of narrow interpretation by the SC.) Between 1960 and 1982, only five of the thirty-five cases concerning the Bill of Rights that were heard by the Supreme Court of Canada resulted in a successful outcome for claimants. The relative ineffectiveness of the Canadian Bill of Rights motivated many to improve rights protections in Canada. The British Parliament formally enacted the Charter as a part of the Canada Act 1982 at the request of the Parliament of Canada in 1982, the result of the efforts of the government of Prime Minister Pierre Trudeau.

The Charter greatly expanded the scope of judicial review, because it is more explicit in its guarantee of rights and the role of judges in enforcing them than was the Canadian Bill of Rights. Canadian courts, when confronted with violations of Charter rights, have struck down unconstitutional federal and provincial statutes and regulations or parts of statutes and regulations, as they did when Canadian case law was primarily concerned with resolving issues of federalism. The Charter, however, granted new powers to the courts to enforce remedies that are more creative and to exclude more evidence in trials. These powers are greater than what was typical under the common law and under a system of government that, influenced by Canada's parent country the United Kingdom, was based upon Parliamentary supremacy. As a result, the Charter has attracted both broad support from a majority of the electorate and criticisms by opponents of increased judicial power. The Charter applies only to government laws and actions (including the laws and actions of federal, provincial, and municipal governments and public school boards), and sometimes to the common law, not to private activity.

== Features ==
Under the Charter, people physically present in Canada have numerous civil and political rights. Most of the rights can be exercised by any legal person (the Charter does not define the corporation as a "legal person"), but a few of the rights belong exclusively to natural persons, or (as in sections 3 and 6) only to citizens of Canada. The rights are enforceable by the courts through section 24 of the Charter, which allows courts discretion to award remedies to those whose rights have been denied. This section also allows courts to exclude evidence in trials if the evidence was acquired in a way that conflicts with the Charter and might damage the reputation of the justice system. Section 32 confirms that the Charter is binding on the federal government, the territories under its authority, and the provincial governments.

=== Exceptions ===
Section 1 of the Charter, known as the limitations clause, allows governments to justify certain infringements of Charter rights. If a court finds that a Charter right has been infringed, it conducts an analysis under section 1 by applying the Oakes test, a form of proportionality review. Infringements are upheld if the government's objective in infringing the right is "pressing and substantial" in a "free and democratic society", and if the infringement can be "demonstrably justified". The Supreme Court of Canada has applied the Oakes test to uphold laws against hate speech (e.g., in R v Keegstra) and obscenity (e.g., in R v Butler). Section 1 also confirms that the rights listed in the Charter are guaranteed.

In addition, some Charter rights are subject to the notwithstanding clause (section 33). The notwithstanding clause authorizes governments to temporarily override the rights and freedoms in sections 2 and 7 through 15 for up to five years, subject to renewal. The Canadian federal government has never invoked it, and some have speculated that its use would be politically costly. In the past, the notwithstanding clause was invoked routinely by the province of Quebec (which did not support the enactment of the Charter but is subject to it nonetheless). The provinces of Saskatchewan and Alberta have also invoked the notwithstanding clause, to end a strike and to protect an exclusively heterosexual definition of marriage, (Note: Alberta's use of the notwithstanding clause is of no force or effect, since the definition of marriage is under federal and not provincial jurisdiction.) respectively. In 2021, the government of Ontario under Premier Doug Ford invoked the notwithstanding clause in order to push through Bill 307, the Protecting Elections and Defending Democracy Act, doubling the amount of time election advertisements could run to 1 year from 6 months. In 2006, the territory of Yukon also passed legislation that invoked the notwithstanding clause, but the legislation was never proclaimed in force.

=== Rights and freedoms ===
The rights and freedoms enshrined in 34 sections of the Charter include:

==== Fundamental freedoms ====
Section 2
lists what the Charter calls "fundamental freedoms" namely freedom of conscience, freedom of religion, freedom of thought, freedom of belief, freedom of expression, freedom of the press and of other media of communication, freedom of peaceful assembly, and freedom of association. In case law, this clause is cited as the reason for the religious neutrality of the state.

==== Democratic rights ====
Generally, the right to participate in political activities and the right to a democratic form of government are protected:

Section 3
the right to vote and to be eligible to serve as member of the House of Commons and provincial and territorial legislative assemblies.
Section 4
the maximum duration of the House of Commons and legislative assemblies is set at five years.
Section 5
an annual sitting of Parliament and legislatures is required.

==== Mobility rights ====
Section 6
protects the mobility rights of Canadian citizens which include the right to enter, remain in, and leave Canada. Citizens and permanent residents have the ability to move to and take up residence in any province to pursue their livelihood.

==== Legal rights ====
Rights of people in dealing with the justice system and law enforcement are protected:

Section 7
right to life, liberty, and security of the person.
Section 8
freedom from unreasonable search and seizure.
Section 9
freedom from arbitrary detention or imprisonment.
Section 10
right to legal counsel and the guarantee of habeas corpus.
Section 11
rights in criminal and penal matters such as the right to be presumed innocent until proven guilty.
Section 12
right not to be subject to cruel and unusual punishment.
Section 13
rights against self-incrimination.
Section 14
right to an interpreter in a court proceeding.

==== Equality rights ====
Section 15
equal treatment before and under the law, and equal protection and benefit of the law without discrimination.

==== Language rights ====
Generally, people have the right to use either the English or French language in communications with Canada's federal government and certain provincial governments. Specifically, the language laws in the Charter include:

Section 16
English and French are the official languages of Canada and New Brunswick.
Section 16.1
the English- and French-speaking communities of New Brunswick have equal rights to educational and cultural institutions.
Section 17
the right to use either official language in Parliament or the New Brunswick legislature.
Section 18
the statutes and proceedings of Parliament and the New Brunswick legislature are to be printed in both official languages.
Section 19
both official languages may be used in federal and New Brunswick courts.
Section 20
the right to communicate with and be served by the federal and New Brunswick governments in either official language.
Section 21
other constitutional language rights outside the Charter regarding English and French are sustained.
Section 22
existing rights to use languages besides English and French are not affected by the fact that only English and French have language rights in the Charter. (Hence, if there are any rights to use Aboriginal languages anywhere they would continue to exist, though they would have no direct protection under the Charter.)

==== Minority language education rights ====
Section 23
rights for certain citizens belonging to French- and English-speaking minority communities to have their children educated in their own language.

==== Other sections ====
The remaining provisions help to clarify how the Charter works in practice.

Section 24
establishes how courts may enforce the Charter.
Section 25
states that the Charter does not derogate existing Aboriginal rights and freedoms. Aboriginal rights, including treaty rights, receive more direct constitutional protection under section 35 of the Constitution Act, 1982.
Section 26
clarifies that other rights and freedoms in Canada are not invalidated by the Charter.
Section 27
requires the Charter to be interpreted in a multicultural context.
Section 28
states all Charter rights are guaranteed equally to men and women.
Section 29
confirms the rights of separate schools are preserved.
Section 30
clarifies the applicability of the Charter in the territories.
Section 31
confirms that the Charter does not extend the powers of legislatures.
Section 32
concerns the application and scope of the Charter.
Section 34
states that Part I of the Constitution Act, 1982, containing the first 34 sections of the act, may be collectively referred to as the "Canadian Charter of Rights and Freedoms".

== History ==
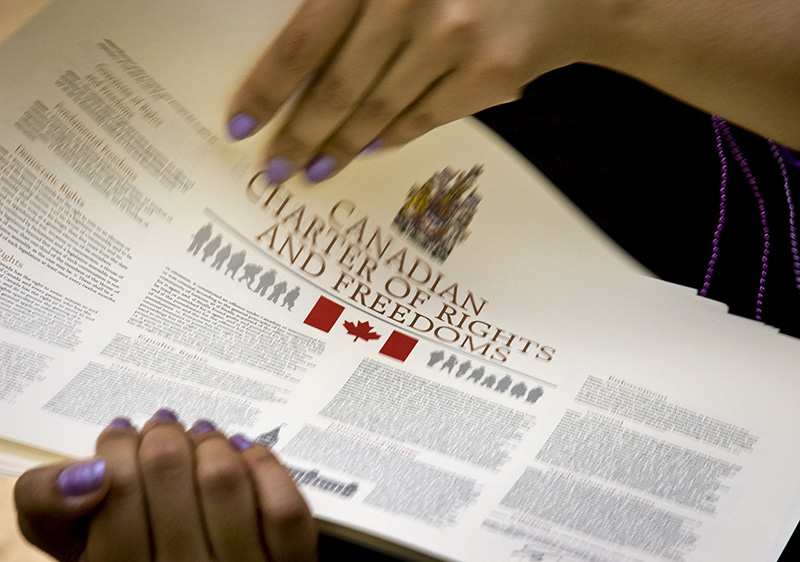
Printed copies of the Canadian Charter of Rights and Freedoms

Many of the rights and freedoms that are protected under the Charter, including the rights to freedom of speech, habeas corpus, and the presumption of innocence, have their roots in a set of Canadian laws and legal precedents sometimes known as the Implied Bill of Rights. Many of these rights were also included in the Canadian Bill of Rights, which the Canadian Parliament enacted in 1960. However, the Bill of Rights had a number of shortcomings. Unlike the Charter, it was an ordinary Act of Parliament, applicable only to the federal government, and could be amended by a simple majority of Parliament. Moreover, the courts chose to interpret the Bill of Rights only sparingly, and only on rare occasions applied it to find a contrary law inoperative. Additionally, the Bill of Rights did not contain all of the rights that are now included in the Charter, omitting, for instance, the right to vote and freedom of movement within Canada.

The centennial of Canadian Confederation in 1967 aroused greater interest within the government in constitutional reform. Such reforms would not only improve the safeguarding of rights, but would also amend the Constitution to free Canada from the authority of British Parliament (also known as patriation), ensuring the full sovereignty of Canada. Subsequently, Attorney General Pierre Trudeau appointed law professor Barry Strayer to research a potential bill of rights. While writing his report, Strayer consulted with a number of notable legal scholars, including Walter Tarnopolsky. Strayer's report advocated a number of ideas that would later be evident in the Charter, including the protection of language rights; exclusion of economic rights; and the allowance of limitations on rights, which would be included in the Charter's limitation and notwithstanding clauses. In 1968, Strayer was made the director of the Constitutional Law Division of the Privy Council Office, followed in 1974 by his appointment as assistant deputy Minister of Justice. During these years, Strayer played a role in writing the bill that was ultimately adopted.

=== Constitution Act, 1982 ===
Meanwhile, Trudeau, who had become Liberal leader and prime minister in 1968, still very much wanted a constitutional bill of rights. The federal and provincial governments discussed creating one during negotiations for patriation, resulting in the Victoria Charter in 1971, which was never implemented. Trudeau continued his efforts, however, promising constitutional change during the 1980 Quebec referendum. He succeeded in 1982 with the passage of the Canada Act 1982 in the British Parliament, which enacted the Constitution Act, 1982 as part of the Constitution of Canada.

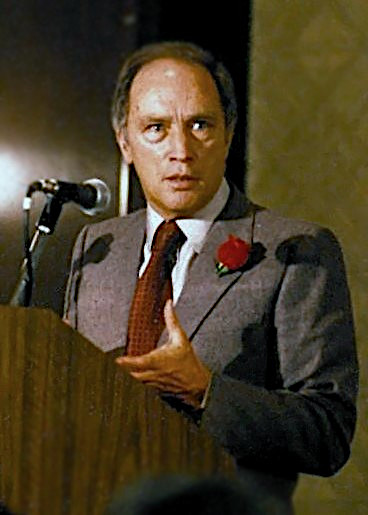
Prime Minister Pierre Trudeau was a major advocate of the Charter.

The inclusion of a charter of rights in the patriation process was a much-debated issue. Trudeau spoke on television in October 1980, where he announced his intention of a just society and constitutionalize a bill of rights that would include: fundamental freedoms, such as the freedom of movement, democratic guarantees, legal rights, language rights and equality rights. However, Trudeau did not want a notwithstanding clause. While his proposal gained popular support, provincial leaders opposed the potential limits on their powers. The federal Progressive Conservative opposition feared liberal bias among judges, should courts be called upon to enforce rights. Additionally, the British Parliament cited their right to uphold Canada's old form of government. At a suggestion of the Conservatives, Trudeau's government thus agreed to a committee of senators and members of Parliament (MPs) to further examine the bill as well as the patriation plan. During this time, 90 hours were spent on the bill of rights alone, all filmed for television, while civil rights experts and advocacy groups put forward their perceptions on the draft charter's flaws and omissions and how to remedy them. As Canada had a parliamentary system of government, and as judges were perceived not to have enforced rights well in the past, it was questioned whether the courts should be named as the enforcers of the Charter, as Trudeau wanted. Conservatives argued that elected politicians should be trusted instead. It was eventually decided that the responsibility should go to the courts. At the urging of civil libertarians, judges could now exclude evidence in trials if acquired in breach of Charter rights in certain circumstances, something the Charter was not originally going to provide for.

As the process continued, more features were added to the Charter, including equality rights for people with disabilities, more sex equality guarantees, and recognition of Canada's multiculturalism. The limitations clause was also reworded to focus less on the importance of parliamentary government and more on the justifiability of limits in free societies; the latter logic was more in line with rights developments around the world after World War II.

In its decision in the Patriation Reference (1981), the Supreme Court ruled there was a constitutional convention that some provincial approval should be sought for constitutional reform. As the provinces still had doubts about the Charter's merits, Trudeau was forced to accept the notwithstanding clause to allow governments to opt out of certain obligations. The notwithstanding clause was accepted as part of a deal called the Kitchen Accord, negotiated by the federal attorney general Jean Chrétien, Ontario's justice minister Roy McMurtry, and Saskatchewan's justice minister Roy Romanow. Pressure from provincial governments (which in Canada have jurisdiction over property) and from the New Democratic Party, also prevented Trudeau from including any rights protecting private property.

==== Quebec ====
Quebec did not support the Charter (or the Canada Act 1982), with conflicting interpretations as to why. The opposition could have owed to the Parti Québécois (PQ) leadership being allegedly uncooperative because it was more committed to gaining sovereignty for Quebec. This could have owed to the exclusion of Quebec leaders from the negotiation of the Kitchen Accord, which they saw as being too centralist. It could have also owed to objections by provincial leaders to the accord's provisions relating to the process of future constitutional amendment. The PQ leaders also opposed the inclusion of mobility rights and minority language education rights. The Charter is applicable in Quebec because all provinces are bound by the constitution. However, Quebec's opposition to the 1982 patriation package led to two failed attempts to amend the constitution (the Meech Lake Accord and Charlottetown Accord) which were designed primarily to obtain Quebec's political approval of the Canadian constitutional order.

=== Following 1982 ===
While the Canadian Charter of Rights and Freedoms was adopted in 1982, it was not until 1985 that the main provisions regarding equality rights (section 15) came into effect. The delay was meant to give the federal and provincial governments an opportunity to review pre-existing statutes and strike potentially unconstitutional inequalities.

==== Amendments ====
The Charter has been amended since its enactment. Section 25 was amended in 1983 to explicitly recognize more rights regarding Aboriginal land claims, while section 16.1 was added in 1993. There have also been a number of unsuccessful attempts to amend the Charter, including the failed Charlottetown Accord of 1992. The Charlottetown Accord would have specifically required the Charter to be interpreted in a manner respectful of Quebec's distinct society, and would have added further statements to the Constitution Act, 1867 regarding racial and sexual equality and collective rights, and about minority language communities. Though the Accord was negotiated among many interest groups, the resulting provisions were so vague that Trudeau, then out of office, feared they would actually conflict with and undermine the Charter's individual rights. He felt judicial review of the rights might be undermined if courts had to favour the policies of provincial governments, as governments would be given responsibility over linguistic minorities. Trudeau thus played a prominent role in leading the popular opposition to the Accord.

== Interpretation and enforcement ==
The task of interpreting and enforcing the Charter falls to the courts, with the Supreme Court of Canada being the ultimate authority on the matter. Litigation involving the charter may be referred to as a Charter challenge.

With the Charter's supremacy confirmed by section 52 of the Constitution Act, 1982, the courts continued their practice of striking down unconstitutional statutes or parts of statutes as they had with earlier case law regarding federalism. However, under section 24 of the Charter, courts also gained new powers to enforce creative remedies and exclude more evidence in trials. Courts have since made many important decisions, including R v Morgentaler (1988), which struck down Canada's abortion law, and Vriend v Alberta (1998), in which the Supreme Court found the province's exclusion of sexual orientation as a prohibited grounds of discrimination violated the equality rights under section 15. In the latter case, the Court then read the protection into the law.

Courts may receive Charter questions in a number of ways. Rights claimants could be prosecuted under a criminal law that they argue is unconstitutional. Others may feel government services and policies are not being dispensed in accordance with the Charter, and apply to lower-level courts for injunctions against the government. (Note: This would be the case in Doucet-Boudreau v. Nova Scotia (Minister of Education).) A government may also raise questions of rights by submitting reference questions to higher-level courts; for example, Prime Minister Paul Martin's government approached the Supreme Court with Charter questions as well as federalism concerns in the case Re Same-Sex Marriage (2004). Provinces may also do this with their superior courts. The government of Prince Edward Island initiated the Provincial Judges Reference by asking its provincial Supreme Court a question on judicial independence under section 11.

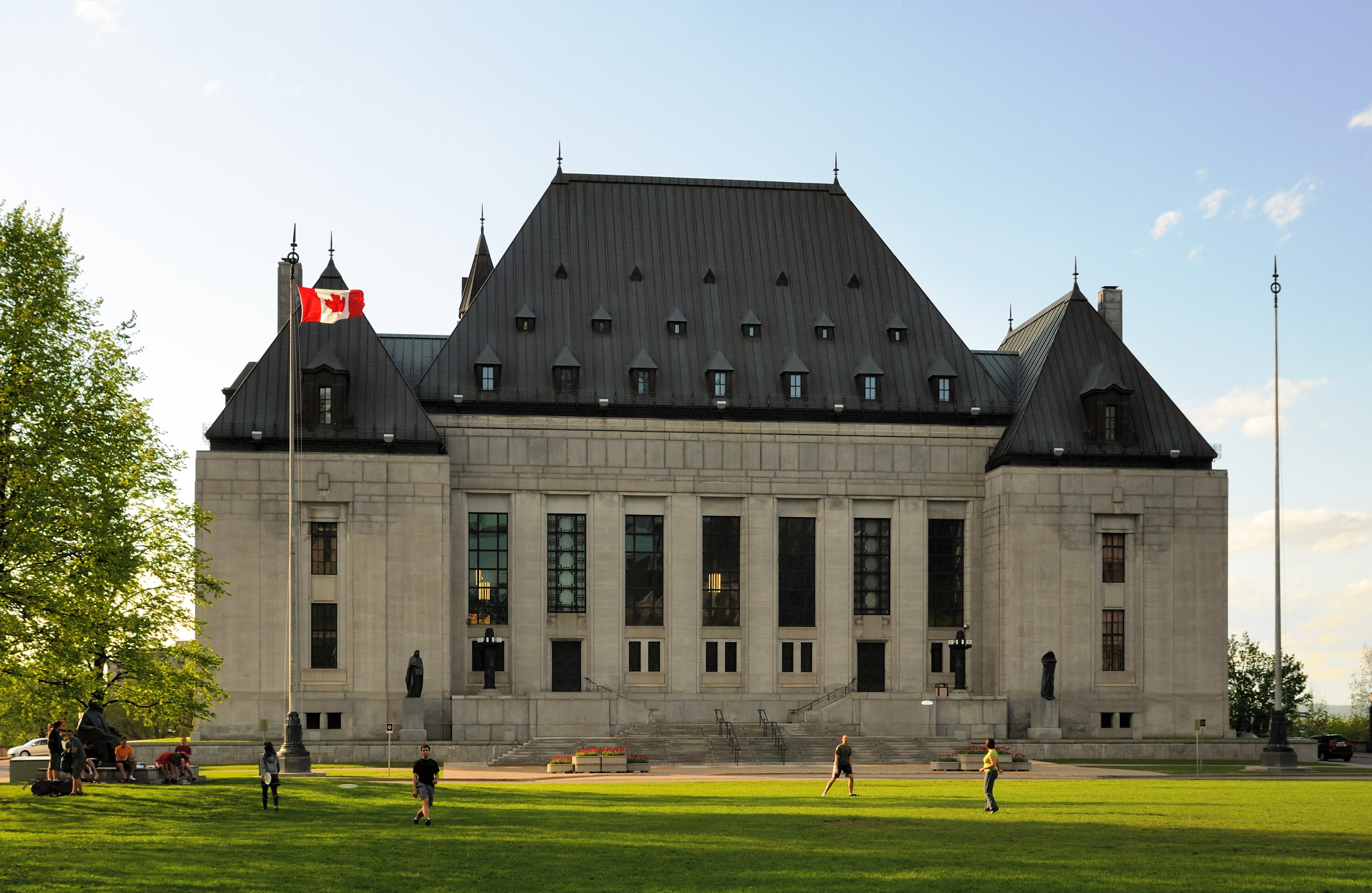
The building of the Supreme Court of Canada, the chief authority on the interpretation of the Charter

In several important cases, judges developed various tests and precedents for interpreting specific provisions of the Charter, including the Oakes test (section 1), set out in the case R v Oakes (1986); and the Law test (section 15), developed in Law v Canada (1999) which has since become defunct. Since Reference Re BC Motor Vehicle Act (1985), various approaches to defining and expanding the scope of fundamental justice (i.e., natural justice or due process) under section 7 have been adopted. (Note: For more information, see the articles on each Charter section.)

=== Purposive and generous interpretation ===
In general, courts have embraced a purposive interpretation of Charter rights. This means that since early cases, such as Hunter v Southam Inc (1984) and R v Big M Drug Mart Ltd (1985), they have concentrated less on the traditional, limited understanding of what each right meant when the Charter was adopted in 1982. Rather, focus has been given towards changing the scope of rights as appropriate to fit their broader purpose. This is tied to the "generous interpretation" of rights, as the purpose of the Charter provisions is assumed to be to increase rights and freedoms of people in a variety of circumstances, at the expense of the government powers.

Constitutional scholar Peter Hogg (2003) has approved of the generous approach in some cases, although for others he argues the purpose of the provisions was not to achieve a set of rights as broad as courts have imagined. The approach has not been without its critics. Alberta politician Ted Morton and political scientist Rainer Knopff have been very critical of this phenomenon. Although they believe in the validity of the living tree doctrine, which is the basis for the approach (and the tradition term for generous interpretations of the Canadian Constitution), they argue Charter case law has been more radical. When the living tree doctrine is applied correctly, Morton and Knopff (2000) claim, "the elm remained an elm; it grew new branches but did not transform itself into an oak or a willow." The doctrine can be used, for example, so a right is upheld even when a government threatens to violate it with new technology, as long as the essential right remains the same, but the authors claim that the courts have used the doctrine to "create new rights". As an example, the authors note that the Charter right against self-incrimination has been extended to cover scenarios in the justice system that had previously been unregulated by self-incrimination rights in other Canadian laws.

=== Other interpretations ===
Another general approach to interpreting Charter rights is to consider international legal precedents with countries that have specific rights protections, such as the U.S. Bill of Rights (which had influenced aspects of the Charter) and the Constitution of South Africa. However, international precedent is only of guiding value and is not binding. For example, the Supreme Court has referred to the Charter and the U.S. Bill of Rights as being "born to different countries in different ages and in different circumstances". (Note: The case quoted in Hogg (2003:732) is R v Rahey (1987) by Gérard La Forest.)

Advocacy groups frequently intervene in cases to make arguments on how to interpret the Charter. Some examples are the British Columbia Civil Liberties Association, Canadian Civil Liberties Association, Canadian Mental Health Association, Canadian Labour Congress, the Women's Legal Education and Action Fund (LEAF), and REAL Women of Canada. The purpose of such interventions is to assist the court and to attempt to influence the court to render a decision favourable to the legal interests of the group.

A further approach to the Charter, taken by the courts, is the dialogue principle, which involves greater participation by elected governments. This approach involves governments drafting legislation in response to court rulings and courts acknowledging the effort if the new legislation is challenged.

== Comparisons with other human rights documents ==
The United States Bill of Rights influenced the text of the Charter, but its rights provisions are interpreted more conservatively. Canadian civil-rights and constitutional cases as compared to American cases occasionally have dissimilar outcomes because the broader Charter rights are limited by the "savings clause" of section 1 of the Charter as interpreted in R v Oakes.

Some Canadian members of Parliament saw the movement to entrench a charter as contrary to the British model of Parliamentary supremacy. Hogg (2003) has speculated that the reason for the British adoption of the Human Rights Act 1998, which allows the European Convention on Human Rights to be enforced directly in domestic courts, is partly because they were inspired by the similar Canadian Charter.

The Canadian Charter bears a number of similarities to the European Convention, specifically in relation to the limitations clauses contained in the European document. Because of this similarity with European human rights law, the Supreme Court turns not only to the United States Constitution case law in interpreting the Charter, but also to European Court of Human Rights cases.

=== Canadian Charter vs. U.S. Bill of Rights ===
The core distinction between the U.S. Bill of Rights and the Canadian Charter is the existence of the limitations and notwithstanding clauses. Canadian courts have consequently interpreted each right more expansively. However, due to the limitations clause, where a violation of a right exists, the law will not necessarily grant protection of that right. In contrast, rights under the U.S. Bill are absolute, thus a violation will not be found until there has been sufficient encroachment on those rights. The sum effect is that both constitutions provide comparable protection of many rights. Canada's fundamental justice (section 7) is therefore interpreted to include more legal protections than due process, which is the U.S. equivalent.

Freedom of expression (section 2) also has a wider-ranging scope than the freedom of speech guaranteed under the U.S. First Amendment (1A). For instance, a form of picketing, though involving speech that might have otherwise been protected, was deemed as disruptive conduct and not protected by the U.S. 1A, but was considered by the Supreme Court in RWDSU v. Dolphin Delivery Ltd. (1986). The Supreme Court would rule the picketing, including the disruptive conduct, as fully protected under section 2 of the Charter, after which section 1 would be used to argue the injunction against the picketing as just.

The limitations clause has also allowed governments to enact laws that would be considered unconstitutional in the U.S. For example, the Supreme Court has upheld some of Quebec's limits on the use of English on signs and has upheld publication bans that prohibit media from mentioning the names of juvenile criminals.

The un-ratified Equal Rights Amendment in the U.S., which garnered many critics when proposed, performs a similar function to that of the Charter section 28, which received no comparable opposition. Still, Canadian feminists had to stage large protests to demonstrate support for the inclusion of section 28, which had not been part of the original draft of the Charter.

Another difference from the U.S. Bill of Rights is that the Charter does not provide any right to possess firearms. In 2000, the Supreme Court of Canada unanimously rejected a constitutional challenge to the federal Firearms Act, ruling that it was within the federal criminal law power.

=== Comparisons to other documents ===
The International Covenant on Civil and Political Rights has several parallels with the Canadian Charter, but in some cases the Covenant goes further with regard to rights in its text. For example, a right to legal aid has been read into section 10 of the Charter (right to counsel), but the Covenant explicitly guarantees the accused need not pay "if he does not have sufficient means".

Canada's Charter has little to say, explicitly at least, about economic and social rights. On this point, it stands in marked contrast with the Quebec Charter of Human Rights and Freedoms and with the International Covenant on Economic, Social and Cultural Rights. There are some who feel economic rights ought to be read into the rights to security of the person (section 7) and equality rights (section 15) to make the Charter similar to the Covenant. The rationale is that economic rights can relate to a decent standard of living and can help the civil rights flourish in a livable environment. Canadian courts, however, have been hesitant in this area, stating that economic rights are political questions and adding that as positive rights, economic rights are of questionable legitimacy.

The Charter itself influenced the Bill of Rights in the Constitution of South Africa. The limitations clause under section 36 of the South African law has been compared to section 1 of the Charter. Likewise, Jamaica's Charter of Fundamental Rights and Freedoms was also influenced, in part, by Canada's Charter.

The "justified limitations" wording from section 1 of the Charter also directly influenced one of the core provisions in the New Zealand Bill of Rights Act 1990, section 5, which similarly states that the right and freedoms found in the New Zealand Act "may be subject only to such reasonable limits prescribed by law as can be demonstrably justified in a free and democratic society.".

== The Charter and national values ==
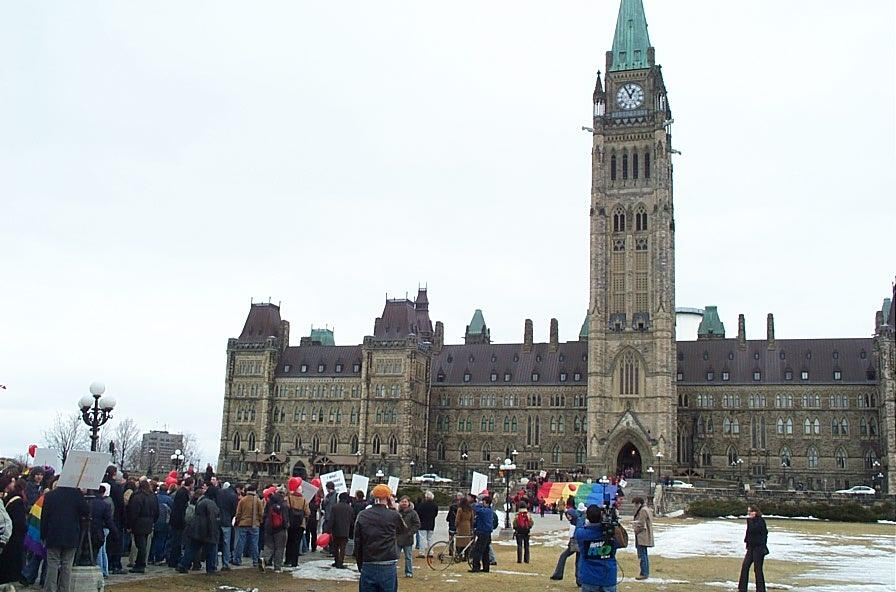
The "March of Hearts" rally for same-sex marriage equality under the Charter in 2004

The Charter was intended to be a source of Canadian values and national unity. As Professor Alan Cairns noted, "the initial federal government premise was on developing a pan-Canadian identity". Pierre Trudeau himself later wrote in his Memoirs (1993) that "Canada itself" could now be defined as a "society where all people are equal and where they share some fundamental values based upon freedom", and that all Canadians could identify with the values of liberty and equality.

The Charter's unifying purpose was particularly important to the mobility and language rights. According to author Rand Dyck (2000), some scholars believe section 23, with its minority language education rights, "was the only part of the Charter with which Pierre Trudeau was truly concerned". Through the mobility and language rights, French Canadians, who have been at the centre of unity debates, are able to travel throughout all Canada and receive government and educational services in their own language. Hence, they are not confined to Quebec (the only province where they form the majority and where most of their population is based), which would polarize the country along regional lines. The Charter was also supposed to standardize previously diverse laws throughout the country and gear them towards a single principle of liberty.

Former premier of Ontario Bob Rae has stated that the Charter "functions as a symbol for all Canadians" in practice because it represents the core value of freedom. Academic Peter Russell has been more skeptical of the Charter's value in this field. Cairns, who feels the Charter is the most important constitutional document to many Canadians, and that the Charter was meant to shape the Canadian identity, has also expressed concern that groups within society see certain provisions as belonging to them alone rather than to all Canadians. It has also been noted that issues like abortion and pornography, raised by the Charter, tend to be controversial. Still, opinion polls in 2002 showed Canadians felt the Charter significantly represented Canada, although many were unaware of the document's actual contents.

The only values mentioned by the Charter's preamble are recognition of the supremacy of God and the rule of law, but these have been controversial and of minor legal consequence. In 1999, MP Svend Robinson brought forward a failed proposal before the House of Commons of Canada that would have amended the Charter by removing the mention of God, as he felt it did not reflect Canada's diversity.

Section 27 also recognizes a value of multiculturalism. In 2002, polls found 86% of Canadians approved of this section.

== Criticism ==
While the Charter has enjoyed a great deal of popularity, with 82 percent of Canadians describing it as a good thing in opinion polls in 1987 and 1999, the document has also been subject to published criticisms from both sides of the political spectrum. According to columnist David Akin (2017), while most Liberals support the Charter, most Conservatives, most New Democrats, most Indigenous people, and Québécois see the Charter as "problematic" and "something to be challenged in order to be Canadian".

One left-wing critic is professor Michael Mandel (1989), (Note: Dyck (2000:446) summarizes Mandel, Michael. 1994 [1989]. The Charter of Rights and the Legalization of Politics in Canada (revised ed.). Toronto: Wall and Thompson.) who wrote that, in comparison to politicians, judges do not have to be as sensitive to the will of the electorate, nor do they have to make sure their decisions are easily understandable to the average Canadian citizen. This, in Mandel's view, limits democracy. Mandel has also asserted that the Charter makes Canada more like the United States, especially by serving corporate rights and individual rights rather than group rights and social rights. He has argued that there are several things that should be included in the Charter, such as a right to health care and a basic right to free education. Hence, the perceived Americanization of Canadian politics is seen as coming at the expense of values more important for Canadians. The labour movement has been disappointed in the reluctance of the courts to use the Charter to support various forms of union activity, such as the "right to strike".

Conservative critics Morton and Knopff (2000) have raised several concerns about the Charter, notably by alleging that the federal government has used it to limit provincial powers by allying with various rights claimants and interest groups. In their book The Charter Revolution & the Court Party (2000), Morton and Knopff express their suspicions of this alliance in detail, accusing the Pierre Trudeau and Chrétien governments of funding litigious groups. For example, these governments used the Court Challenges Program to support minority language educational rights claims. Morton and Knopff also assert that crown counsel has intentionally lost cases in which the government was taken to court for allegedly violating rights, (Note: Morton and Knopff (2000) complain about crown counsels on p.117.) particularly gay rights and women's rights.

Political scientist Rand Dyck (2000), in observing these criticisms, notes that while judges have had their scope of review widened, they have still upheld most laws challenged on Charter grounds. With regard to litigious interest groups, Dyck points out that "the record is not as clear as Morton and Knopff imply. All such groups have experienced wins and losses."

Political philosopher Charles Blattberg (2003) has criticized the Charter for contributing to the fragmentation of the country, at both the individual and group levels. In encouraging discourse based upon rights, Blattberg claims the Charter injects an adversarial spirit into Canadian politics, making it difficult to realize the common good. Blattberg also claims that the Charter undercuts the Canadian political community since it is ultimately a cosmopolitan document. Finally, he argues that people would be more motivated to uphold individual liberties if they were expressed with terms that are much "thicker" (less abstract) than rights.

== See also ==
- Canadian values
- Veterans' Bill of Rights
  - List of Supreme Court of Canada cases (Dickson Court)
  - List of Supreme Court of Canada cases (Lamer Court)
  - List of Supreme Court of Canada cases (McLachlin Court)
