= Section 14 of the Canadian Charter of Rights and Freedoms =

Constitutional right to interpreters in trials

Section 14 of the Canadian Charter of Rights and Freedoms is the last section under the "Legal rights" heading in the Charter. It provides anyone in a court the right to an interpreter if the person does not speak the language being used or is deaf.

== Text ==
The section states:

14. A party or witness in any proceedings who does not understand or speak the language in which the proceedings are conducted or who is deaf has the right to the assistance of an interpreter.

Before the Charter was enacted in 1982, the right to an interpreter in a trial existed under the common law, because it was believed to be necessary for natural justice. The right was incorporated into the Canadian Bill of Rights in 1960. Section 2(g) of this Act read that a person has a right to "the assistance of an interpreter in any proceedings in which he is involved or in which he is a party or a witness, before a court, commission, board or other tribunal, if he does not understand or speak the language in which such proceedings are conducted."

Unlike the Charter, the Bill of Rights was a statute and not part of the Constitution of Canada. The Bill of Rights also did not guarantee this right to the deaf community. The language right was included in an early draft of the Charter, and the rights belonging to the deaf later appeared in April 1981.

The Supreme Court of Canada has said the right also has a basis in Canada's multiculturalism. Canadians' "multicultural heritage" is recognized in section 27 of the Charter.

== Interpretation ==
The rights implied by section 14 were defined by the Supreme Court in the case R. v. Tran (1994), which involved an interpreter for a defendant who spoke Vietnamese in an English language trial. The Supreme Court found that section 14 requires the translation to be of consistent quality ("continuity") and unbiased accuracy. However, not everything in the trial must be translated if it is not truly important to the defendant's rights. The finding on the required quality came from the purpose of the right, which, based in natural justice and multiculturalism, emphasized that a defendant must fully understand the trial. Natural justice means a defendant can respond to accusations. The Court also stated that the quality of the translation must not be so high that the defendant is actually more informed than those who speak the court's language.

People asking for an interpreter must demonstrate an inability to understand the language of the court and ask for section 14 rights to be fulfilled. However, Tran established that this burden "will not normally be an onerous step," and some courts with a high volume of cases involving multicultural parties will routinely provide interpreters upon request without much if any inquiry as to need. The court itself is also responsible for satisfying the right, and sometimes a section 14 request does not have to be made by a defendant in order for an interpreter to be provided under section 14.
