= Section 27 of the Canadian Charter of Rights and Freedoms =

Constitutional recognition of multiculturalism

Section 27 of the Canadian Charter of Rights and Freedoms is a section of the Charter that, as part of a range of provisions within the section 25 to section 31 bloc, helps determine how rights in other sections of the Charter should be interpreted and applied by the courts. Section 27 officially recognized multiculturalism as a Canadian value.

== Text ==
Section 27 provides:

27 This Charter shall be interpreted in a manner consistent with the preservation and enhancement of the multicultural heritage of Canadians.

== Background and drafting ==
In Canada, multicultural policy had been adopted in 1971 following the Royal Commission on Bilingualism and Biculturalism, a government body set up in response to the grievances of Canada's French-speaking minority (concentrated in the province of Quebec). The report of the Commission advocated that the Canadian government should recognize Canada as a bilingual and bicultural society and adopt policies to preserve this character.

Bicultural was opposed by non-French ethnic minorities communities, particularly the large Ukrainian Canadian and other European communities. In 1973 the government formed the Canadian Consultative Council on Multiculturalism (CCCM) to consult with ethnocultural community leaders. The communities themselves organized an umbrella group in 1980 to lobby the government called the Canadian Ethnocultural Council, spearheaded by Dr. Leonardo Leone of the National Congress of Italian Canadians. These groups lobbied during the constitutional debates for the inclusion of what eventually became Section 27. Lawyer and future mayor of Edmonton and leader of the Alberta Liberal Party Laurence Decore was the head of the CCCM from 1980 to 1983 and is sometimes credited as principal drafter of Section 27.

== Purpose and application ==
When the Charter was enacted in 1982, constitutional scholar Peter Hogg observed that this section did not actually contain a right; namely, it did not say that Canadians have a right to multiculturalism. The section was instead meant to guide the interpretation of the Charter to respect Canada's multiculturalism. Hogg also remarked that it was difficult to see how this could have a large impact on the reading of the Charter, and thus section 27 could be "more of a rhetorical flourish than an operative provision."

Section 27 can be seen as a declaration of a national value of multiculturalism. In 2002, polls found 86% of Canadians approved of this section.

== Impact ==
=== Freedom of religion ===
Section 27 has been referred to by the courts. The Court of Appeal for Ontario in Videoflicks Ltd. et al. v. R. (1984) argued that section 27 should receive "significance" from the courts, and that the section could reinforce freedom of religion (section 2). As this court put it, if a law limits the free exercise of religion, then the law is also of no use in promoting multiculturalism, since it affects a "part of one's culture which is religiously based." Hence, section 27 demands that governments must respect and tolerate various religions, even if this means that some cultural groups may be exempted from certain things the government compels the people to do, even if this proves to place "inconveniences" on the government. This line of thinking was reaffirmed by the Supreme Court of Canada in R. v. Edwards Books and Art Ltd. (1986).

The Supreme Court also referred to section 27 in the landmark Charter case R. v. Big M Drug Mart Ltd. (1985), in which the guarantee of freedom of religion in section 2 of the Charter was used to invalidate laws that required businesses to be closed on Sundays, the Christian Sabbath. As the Court noted, the Parliament of Canada requiring Canadians to observe "the day of rest preferred by one religion" contradicted multiculturalism and section 27.

=== Freedom of expression ===
Section 27 was applied by Chief Justice Brian Dickson in a different way in the Supreme Court case Canada (Human Rights Commission) v. Taylor (1990). In this case, Dickson found section 27 could reinforce limits on freedom of expression (in section 2), specifically hate speech. Section 27, along with section 15 of the Charter (the equality rights), would suggest fighting racial and religious discrimination would be a sufficient objective under section 1 of the Charter for limiting free expression under section 2.

Despite this, section 27 does not indicate that there are built-in limits in freedom of expression based on multiculturalism. Limits are measured in section 1. In R. v. Keegstra, also decided in 1990, the Court wrote that using sections 15 and 27 to limit the scope of freedom of expression contradicted "the large and liberal interpretation given the freedom of expression in Irwin Toy" and at any rate "s. 1 of the Charter is especially well suited to the task of balancing."

=== Equality rights ===
Legal scholar Walter Tarnopolsky speculated in 1982 that section 27 could probably be most relevant to the interpretation of the section 15 equality rights. As he wrote, section 15 already protects ethnic origin and religion, but section 15's guarantee of "equal benefit of the law," combined with section 27, could lead to governments financially supporting minority culture. This would be particularly true if there was any inequality between how cultural groups are funded.

=== Aboriginal rights ===
In various cases, courts have refused to use section 27 (or section 25) to give First Nations a right to have a certain number of seats on a jury in a trial.

=== Legislation ===
Section 27 is referenced by the Canadian Multiculturalism Act, legislation enacted in 1988.
