= Walter Tarnopolsky =

Walter Surma Tarnopolsky
- Born: August 1, 1932; Gronlid, Saskatchewan, Canada
- Died: September 15, 1993 (aged 61)

Academic background
- Education: University of Saskatchewan, Columbia University
- Alma mater: London School of Economics

Academic work
- Discipline: Jurist

Walter Surma Tarnopolsky (August 1, 1932 – September 15, 1993) was a Canadian judge, legal scholar, and pioneer in the development of human rights law and civil liberties in Canada.

== Background and education ==
Walter Surma Tarnopolsky was born on August 1, 1932, in Gronlid, Saskatchewan, to parents of Ukrainian descent. He was educated at the University of Saskatchewan, receiving his BA in 1953 and his LLB in 1957. After completing his undergraduate education, he attended Columbia University, receiving his MA in 1955. He subsequently received his LLM from the London School of Economics.

Degree	School	Year
BA	University of Saskatchewan	1953
MA	Columbia University	1955
LLB	University of Saskatchewan	1957
LLM	London School of Economics	1962

== Career ==
Tarnopolsky taught law at several Canadian universities, specializing in the fields of human rights and civil liberties. Between 1959 and 1983, he was a professor of law at the University of Saskatchewan, University of Windsor, Osgoode Hall Law School of York University, and the University of Ottawa. He briefly served as the vice-president (Academic) of York University in 1972 and was the dean of Law at the University of Windsor from 1968 to 1972.

Year	Law School
1959–1960	University of Saskatchewan
1962–1963	University of Ottawa
1963–1967	University of Saskatchewan
1967–1968	Osgoode Hall Law School
1968–1972	University of Windsor
1972–1979	Osgoode Hall Law School
1979–1983	University of Ottawa

From 1977 to 1983, he was a member of the United Nations Human Rights Committee. From 1977 to 1982, he was the president of the Canadian Civil Liberties Association. In 1985, he was appointed to the Court of Appeal for Ontario. He served on the Court of Appeal until his death on 15 September 1993 in Toronto.

== Publications ==
- Discrimination and the Law in Canada (1982)
- "Freedom of the press" in Newspapers and the Law (1981)
- The Canadian Bill of Rights (1966, 1975)
