= Rand Dyck =

Perry Rand Dyck (born 1943 in Calgary, Alberta) is the author of the Canadian Politics: Critical Approaches textbook which is used in many Canadian universities, and taught to students studying Political Science, Law, Economics, Women's Studies, Philosophy, Anthropology, Sociology, and History. Since 1993, Dr. Dyck has participated in the organisation of the Laurentian University Model Parliament, an event which has been featured in Maclean's magazine. He currently teaches at Carleton University as an adjunct professor and also at Nunavut Sivuniksavut in Ottawa. He won the Teaching Excellence Award at Laurentian University and the OCUFA Teaching Excellence Award in 2002 and the Faculty of Public Affairs Teaching Award at Carleton University in 2014.

== Model Parliament ==
Dyck was responsible for the creation of the Laurentian University Model Parliament, or (LUMP), in 1992. Since that time, the LUMP was organized by the Laurentian University Political Science Association, and included students from Laurentian's affiliated colleges. The LUMP met annually in January for 28 years, initially alternating between the Ontario Legislature in Toronto and the House of Commons in Ottawa. Every five years, it also held an Alumni Model Parliament in the Senate Chamber, and was the only model parliament to operate a bicameral and, thanks to the staff of the House of Commons, completely bilingual legislature. Unfortunately, the existence of LUMP was initially threatened by the COVID pandemic and by the disappearance of the Laurentian University Department of Political Science in 2021.

== List of publications ==
=== Books ===
- Dyck, R. (1986). Provincial Politics in Canada. Scarborough, ON: Prentice Hall. 626p.
- Dyck, R. (1991). Provincial Politics in Canada. 2nd edition. Scarborough, ON: Prentice Hall. 678p.
- Dyck, R. (1993). Canadian Politics: Critical Approaches. Scarborough, ON: Nelson Canada. 594p.
- Dyck, R. (1995). Provincial Politics in Canada: towards the turn of the century. 3rd edition. Scarborough, ON: Prentice Hall Canada, 689p.
- Dyck, R. (1996). Canadian Politics: Critical Approaches. 2nd edition. Scarborough, ON: Nelson Canada, 672p.
- Dyck, R. (1998). Canadian Politics: Concise Edition. Scarborough, ON: ITP Nelson, 334p.
- Dyck, R. (2000). Canadian Politics: Critical Approaches, 3rd ed. Scarborough, ON: Nelson Thomson Learning, 672p.
- Dyck, R. (2002). Canadian Politics: Concise Second Edition. Scarborough, ON: Thomson Nelson. 386p.
- Dyck, R. (2003). Canadian Politics: Critical Approaches, 4th ed. Scarborough, ON: Thomson Nelson. 706p.
- Dyck, R., Ed. (2003). Studying Politics: An Introduction to Political Science. Scarborough, ON: Thomson Nelson. 434p.
- Dyck, R. (2006). Canadian Politics: Concise Third Edition. Toronto, ON: Thomson Nelson. 449p.
- Dyck, R., Ed. (2006). Studying Politics: An Introduction to Political Science, 2nd ed. Toronto: Thomson Nelson. 442p.
- Dyck, R. (2008). Canadian Politics: Critical Approaches, 5th ed. Toronto: Nelson Education. 722p.
- Dyck, R. (2009). Canadian Politics: Concise Fourth Edition. Toronto: Nelson Education. 454p.
- Dyck, R., Ed. (2009). Studying Politics: An Introduction to Political Science, 3rd ed. Toronto: Nelson Education. 504p.
- Dyck, R. (2011). Canadian Politics: Critical Approaches, 6th ed. Toronto: Nelson Education. 728p.
- Dyck, R. (2012). Canadian Politics: Concise Fifth Edition. Toronto: Nelson Education. 466p.
- Dyck, R., Ed. (2012) Studying Politics: An Introduction to Political Science, 4th ed. Toronto: Nelson Education. 490p.
- Dyck, R. and Christopher Cochrane. (2013) Canadian Politics: Critical Approaches, 7th ed. Toronto: Nelson Education. 712p.
- Anderson, Christopher G. and Rand Dyck. (2016). Studying Politics: An Introduction to Political Science, 5th ed. Toronto: Nelson Education. 501p.
- Cochrane, C., Blidook, K., and Rand Dyck. (2017). Canadian Politics: Critical Approaches, 8th ed. Toronto: Nelson Education. 706p.
- Cochrane, C., Blidook, K., and Rand Dyck. (2021). Canadian Politics: Critical Approaches, 9th ed., Toronto: Nelson Education. 662p. See also Top Hat.

Chapters in Books and Journal Articles

- Dyck, R. (1976). "The Canada Assistance Plan: the ultimate in cooperative federalism." In Canadian Public Administration. December 1976.
- Dyck, R. (1980). "Electoral Reform." In The Government & Politics of Ontario. Ed. by Donald C. MacDonald. Toronto, ON: Van Nostrand Reinhold Ltd. 314–334.
- Dyck, R. (1980). "The Canada Assistance Plan: the ultimate in cooperative federalism." In Perspectives on the Canadian Health & Welfare System. Ed. C. Meilicke & J. Storch. Ann Arbor: University of Michigan.
- Dyck, R. (1988). "The Position of Ontario in the Canadian Federation." In Perspectives on Canadian Federalism. Ed. by R.D. Olling and M.W. Westmacott. Scarborough, ON: Prentice-Hall Canada.
- Dyck, R. (1989). "Relations Between Federal and Provincial Parties." In Canadian Parties in Transition. Ed. by A.G. Gagnon and A.B. Tanguay. Scarborough, On: Nelson Canada.
- Dyck, R. (1989). "The Canada Assistance Plan: the ultimate in cooperative federalism." In Federalism in Canada. Ed. G. Stevenson. Toronto, ON: McClelland and Stewart.
- Dyck, R. (1990). "The Socio-Economic Setting of Ontario Politics." In The Government and Politics of Ontario. Ed. by G. White. Scarborough, ON: Nelson Canada.
- Dyck, R. (1993). "Links between federal and provincial parties and party systems." In Representation, integration and political parties in Canada. Ed. by H. Bakvis. (Vol. 14 of the Research Studies for the Royal Commission on Electoral Reform and Party Financing), 129–177.
- Dyck, R. (1995). "The Canada assistance plan: the ultimate in cooperative federalism." In Social welfare in Canada. Ed. by R. Blake and J. Keshen. Mississauga, ON: Copp Clark Ltd., 326–339.
- Dyck, R. (1995). "Ontario." In Canadian annual review of politics and public affairs 1988. Ed. by D. Leyton-Brown. Toronto, ON: University of Toronto Press, 191–218.
- Dyck, R. (1996). "Relations between federal and provincial parties." In Canadian parties in transition. Ed. by A.B. Tanguay and A.-G. Gagnon. Scarborough, ON: Nelson Canada, 160–189.
- Dyck, R. (1996). "Ontario." In Canadian annual review of politics and public affairs 1989. Ed. by David Leyton-Brown. Toronto, ON: University of Toronto Press, 123–147.
- Dyck, R. (1997). "Federalism and Canadian political parties." In Challenges to Canadian federalism. Ed. by Martin Westmacott and Hugh Mellon. Scarborough, ON: Prentice-Hall, 55–62.
- Dyck, R. (1997). "The socio-economic setting of Ontario politics." In The government and politics of Ontario, 5th ed. Ed. by Graham White. Toronto, ON: University of Toronto Press, 19–48.
- Dyck, R. (1997). "Ontario." . In Canadian annual review of politics and public affairs 1990. Ed. by David Leyton-Brown. Toronto, ON: University of Toronto Press, 129–157.
- Dyck, R. (1997). "The Provinces and Regional-Economic Conflicts." In Expanding our political horizons: readings in Canadian politics and government. Ed. by J.J. Guy. Toronto, ON: Harcourt Brace & Co., 316–321.
- Dyck, R. (1998). "Ontario." In Canadian annual review of politics and public affairs 1991. Ed. by David Leyton-Brown. Toronto, ON: University of Toronto Press, 139–167.
- Dyck, R. and Sam Bottomley. (1998). "Ontario." In Canadian annual review of politics and public affairs 1992. Ed. by David Leyton-Brown. Toronto, ON: University of Toronto Press, 137–165.
- Dyck, R. (1998). "Can Canada Survive?" In Italian Politics & Society, 50 (Autumn): 87–91.
- Dyck, R. (2000). "Recent Work on Canadian Political Institutions." Journal of Canadian Studies, 35 (1, spring): 239–252.
- Dyck, R. (2001). "The Societal Context of Canadian Parties." In Party Politics in Canada, 8th ed., Edited by H.G. Thorburn and Alan Whitehorn. Scarborough, ON: Prentice-Hall Canada, 36–48.
- Dyck, R. (2006). "Provincial Politics in the Modern Era." In Provinces: Canadian Provincial Politics, 2nd ed. Ed. by Christopher Dunn. Peterborough, ON: Broadview Press, 57–94.
- Dyck, R. (2016). “Political Developments in the Provinces, 2005-2015.” In Provinces: Canadian Provincial Politics, 3rd ed. Ed. by Christopher Dunn. Toronto: University of Toronto Press.
- Dyck, R. (2017). "The Social and Economic Context of Ontario Politics." In The Politics of Ontario. Ed. Cheryl N. Collier and Jonathan Malloy. Toronto: University of Toronto Press.

=== Reviews ===
- Dyck, R. (1991). "Nova Scotia, Ottawa and the politics of regional development. By James P. Bickerton." In Canadian Public Policy / Analyse de politiques, 17 (1, March/mars): 115.
- Dyck, R. (1992). "Leaders and parties in Canadian politics: experiences of the provinces. Ed. by R.K. Carty, L. Erickson and D.E. Blake." In Canadian Journal of Political Science, XXV (4): 775.
- Dyck, R. (1993). "The provincial state: politics in Canada's provinces and territories. Ed. by Keith Brownsey and Michael Howlett." In Canadian Journal of Political Science, 26 (4, December/décembre): 812–813.
- Dyck, R. (1996). "Charter versus federalism: the dilemmas of constitutional reform. By A.C. Cairns." In Canadian Review of Studies in Nationalism, XXII (1–2): 185–186.
- Dyck, R. (1998). "Poverty Reform in Canada 1958-1978: State and Class Influence on Policy Making. By Rodney S. Haddow." In Canadian Public Administration, 41 (2, Summer): 337–338.
- Dyck, R. (1998). "Politics, Policy, and Government in British Columbia. Ed. by R.K. Carty." In Canadian Journal of Political Science, XXXI (4, December): 802–803.
- Dyck, R. (2016). Transforming Provincial Politics: The Political Economy of Canada's Provinces and Territories in the Neoliberal Era. Ed. by Bryan M. Evans and Charles W. Smith." In Labour/Le Travail, #77 (Spring 2016).
