= Canadian immigration and refugee law =

Canadian immigration and refugee law concerns the area of law related to the admission of foreign nationals into Canada, their rights and responsibilities once admitted, and the conditions of their removal. The primary law on these matters is in the Immigration and Refugee Protection Act, whose goals include economic growth, family reunification, and compliance with humanitarian treaties.

As a result of the 1991 Canada-Quebec Accord, Quebec gained full selection process for economic migrants within the province's borders. As of 2023, between 50 and 60 percent of permanent residents born abroad are chosen by Quebec authorities, with the national government selecting the rest.

== Former legislation and policy ==
Canada has had laws and regulations governing the admission of immigrants since 1869, two years following Confederation.

The following is a timeline of the former Canadian legal system, both federal and provincial, as it relates to immigration:

- An Act to Regulate the Carrying of Passengers in Merchant Vessels (1828) — the first legislative recognition of the Canadas' responsibility over the safety and well-being of migrants leaving the British Isles. It regulated the number of passengers that could be carried on a ship, determined the amount of space allocated to them, and required the provision of food and water for the voyage.
- Immigration Act, 1869 — Canada's first immigration policy following Confederation. It contained few restrictions on immigration, mainly focusing on ensuring the safety of immigrants en route to Canada and protecting them from exploitation upon their arrival.
- Dominion Lands Act (1872) — legislation that aimed to encourage the settlement of the Canadian Prairies and to help prevent the area being claimed by the United States. The act was closely based on the U.S. Homestead Act of 1862, setting conditions in which the western lands could be settled and their natural resources developed.
- Royal Commission on Chinese Immigration (1885) — a royal commission appointed by the government in hopes to prove the need for the regulation of Chinese immigration to Canada. The commission recommended imposing a $10 duty on each Chinese person seeking entry into Canada.
- Chinese Immigration Act, 1885 (amendments in 1887, 1892, 1900, 1903) — Canada's first piece of legislation to prevent immigrants based on their ethnic origin, following a large influx of Chinese labourers to Canada in the 1880s. The act imposed the now-infamous Chinese head tax: a duty on every Chinese person seeking entry into Canada, beginning at $50 per person, increasing to $100 per person in 1900, and to $500 in 1903.
- Royal Commission on Italian Immigration (1904-1905) — a royal commission appointed in 1904 to investigate the exploitation of Italian labourers by employment brokers known as padroni. The padroni recruited Italian workers for companies in Canada and oversaw their transport and employment upon arriving in Canada. The commission focused its investigation on Antonio Cordasco, who chiefly recruited labourers for the Canadian Pacific Railway.
- Immigration Act, 1906 — a more restrictive immigration policy, expanding the categories of prohibited immigrants, formalizing a deportation process, and assigning the government enhanced powers to make arbitrary judgements on admission.
- Newfoundland Chinese Immigration Act (1906) — legislation in Newfoundland, still a British colony at the time, that introduced a $300 head tax on Chinese immigrants. The head tax remained in effect until Newfoundland and Labrador joined Confederation in 1949.
- Gentlemen's Agreement (Hayashi–Lemieux Agreement; 1908) — an agreement between Canadian minister of labour Rodolphe Lemieux and Japanese foreign minister Tadasu Hayashi to restrict Japanese immigration to Canada. Under the agreement, the Japanese government voluntarily limited the number of Japanese immigrants yearly arriving in Canada to 400. Such restrictions were considered necessary following a recent influx of Japanese labourers in British Columbia and a rise in anti-Asian sentiment in the province, particularly the Pacific Coast race riots of 1907.
- Continuous journey regulation (1908) — a regulation requiring prospective immigrants to travel to Canada by "continuous journey" from the country of origin. This effectively blocked Indian immigration as there was no direct ship route between India and Canada at this time.
- Immigration Act, 1910 — legislation expanding the list of prohibited immigrants and providing the government with greater discretionary authority in regard to the admissibility and deportation of immigrants. It allowed for the prohibiting of immigrants determined to be "unsuited to the climate or requirements of Canada"
- Order-in-Council P.C. 1911-1324 (1911) — an Order in Council banning "any immigrants belonging to the Negro race, which is deemed unsuitable to the climate and requirements of Canada." (The ban was not written into the Immigration Act.)
- Naturalization Act, 1914 — legislation introducing more stringent requirements for naturalization in Canada, wherein approval for a certificate of naturalization required immigrants to live in Canada for 5 years, possess adequate knowledge of French or English, and exhibit good moral character.
- Immigration Act, 1919 — an amendment to the 1910 Immigration Act, providing more restrictive regulations in response to the postwar economic downturn, labour unrest, and increasing anti-foreign sentiment. Immigrants from enemy alien countries were denied entry and the restricted categories of political dissidents were expanded. The federal cabinet was also allowed to prohibit immigrants of any nationality, race, occupation and class because of their "peculiar customs, habits, modes of life and methods of holding property."
- Empire Settlement Act, 1922 — an agreement between the British government and several commonwealth countries designed to facilitate the resettlement of agriculturalists, farmworkers, and juvenile immigrants throughout the Empire.
- Chinese Immigration Act, 1923 — legislation virtually restricting all Chinese immigration to Canada.
- Railway Agreement, 1925 — an agreement by the Government of Canada with the Canadian Pacific Railway and the Canadian National Railway permitting the companies to control the recruitment and settlement of European agriculturalists. The agreement was cancelled in 1930.
- Order-in-Council P.C. 1931-695 (1931) — an order-in-council passed on 21 March 1931 allowing for the implementation of the tightest immigration admissions policy in Canadian history.
- Canadian Citizenship Act (1947) — legislation creating the category Canadian citizenship and allowing for residents of Canada to obtain citizenship regardless of their country of origin. (Previously, individuals born in Canada and naturalized immigrants were classified as British subjects rather than Canadian citizens.)
- Immigration Act, 1952 — the first new Canadian immigration act since 1910, reinforcing the powers of the federal cabinet and investing the minister of citizenship and immigration with broad discretionary powers over admissibility and deportation.
- Immigration Regulations, Order-in-Council PC 1962-86 (1962) — regulations eliminating overt racial discrimination from Canadian immigration policy.
- White Paper on Immigration (1966) — a policy document commissioned by the federal government to review immigration legislation and make recommendations on its restructuring. The White Paper suggested that Canada ought to focus on recruiting qualified immigrants and tighten the controls on sponsored immigration to avoid an influx of unskilled labourers. The report would lay the groundwork for new immigration regulations the following year.
- Immigration Regulations, Order-in Council PC 1967-1616 (1967) — regulations establishing new standards for evaluating potential immigrants, through a point-based system.
- Immigration Act, 1976 — the first immigration legislation to clearly outline the objectives of Canadian immigration policy, define refugees as a distinct class of immigrants, and mandate the Canadian government to consult with other levels of government in the planning and management of immigration.

=== Immigration Act, 1976 ===
Immigration Act, 1976

Parliament of Canada
- Assented to: 1976
- Effective: 1978
- Repealed: 2002

Repealed by
- Immigration and Refugee Protection Act

Related legislation
- Immigration Act, 1869
- Status: Repealed

The Immigration Act, 1976, insured by the Parliament of Canada, was the first immigration legislation to clearly outline the objectives of Canadian immigration policy, define refugees as a distinct class of immigrants, and mandate the Canadian government to consult with other levels of government in the planning and management of immigration.

It focused on who should be allowed into Canada, rather than on who should be kept out. The Act came into force in 1978, along with new immigration regulations, giving more power to the provinces to set their own immigration laws and defined "prohibited classes" in much broader terms. Individuals who could become a burden on social welfare or health services would now be refused entry, rather than specific categories of people, e.g., those who identified themselves as homosexual, disabled, and so on.

Further, it created four new classes of immigrants who could come to Canada: refugees, families, assisted relatives, and independent immigrants. While independent immigrants had to take part in the points system, other classes did not have to take part in this test so long as they passed basic criminal, security, and health checks. The act also created alternatives to deportation for less serious criminal or medical offences, since deportation meant the immigrant was barred from entering Canada for life. After 1978, the government could issue 12-month exclusion orders and a departure notice, if the cause for a person's removal was not serious, but in some cases, it could be severe.

The enforcement team with the Department of Citizenship and Immigration Canada was responsible for enforcing the act at border crossings with the United States as well as checkpoints at international airports in Canada.

The 1976 Immigration Act was replaced by the Immigration and Refugee Protection Act (IRPA) in 2002.

== Current enabling laws ==
=== Immigration and Refugee Protection Act ===
The primary statute regarding immigration and refugee law in Canada is the Immigration and Refugee Protection Act (IRPA), accompanied by the Immigration and Refugee Protection Regulations and Protection of Passenger Information Regulations. First introduced in 2002 to replace the former Immigration Act of 1976, the many changes brought on by IRPA included broader discretion for immigration officers when evaluating applications.

Other relevant legislation include the Citizenship Act, and certain immigration and refugee-related provisions of the Criminal Code.

Immigration detainees in Canada are held in Immigration Holding Centres (IHCs; French: Le centre de surveillance de l'immigration), under the auspices of the Canada Border Services Agency (CBSA). Immigration detainees may also be kept in provincial jails, either because the IHCs are full, there is no centres in their region, or the detainee's file has a link to criminality. Detainees can include: asylum seekers without sufficient amount of necessary identification papers; foreign workers whose visas had expired; and individuals awaiting deportation.

=== Protecting Canada's Immigration System Act ===
The Protecting Canada's Immigration System Act (Bill C-31) was established in hopes of amending Canadian immigration and refugee law by addressing the number of "bogus refugees" and claimants from European Union democracies.

=== Strengthening Canada's Immigration System and Border's Act ===
The Immigration and Refugee Protection Act was amended in 2026 by Bill C-12, An Act respecting certain measures relating to the security of Canada's borders and the integrity of the Canadian immigration system and respecting other related security measures, assented to on March 26, 2026. Changes included authorizing the Governor in Council to make orders specifying that certain applications were not to be processed, or to suspend or terminate the processing of those applications, or prescribing circumstances in which officers may terminate the processing of certain applications. It further excluded applicants who had been in Canada for over a year prior to make an application or for fourteen days after entering Canada at a land border in between ports of entry from being admissible for a full hearing before the Immigration and Refugee Board. These individuals will instead be offered Pre-Removal Risk Assesments prior to removal.

=== Safe Third Country Agreement ===
Under the Canada–United States Safe Third Country Agreement (STCA), people from a country that is not Canada or the United States who attempt to enter Canada at a legal border crossing seeking refugee status will be turned back.

There are 4 types of exceptions to the STCA: refugee claimants who have a family member in Canada; unaccompanied minors under the age of 18; individuals holding a valid Canadian visa; and those who have been charged with or convicted of an offence that could subject them to the death penalty in the United States or in a third country. The STCA has a fifth exception, being claimants who entered Canada at a "location that is not a port of entry." This last exception has since mainly been removed by the adoption of the Strengthening Canada's Immigration System and Borders Act.

=== International laws ===
The Government of Canada is held to comply with the following international laws in relation to migration and refuge/asylum:

- United Nations Convention against Torture (CAT), signed in New York in December 1984.
- Convention Relating to the Status of Refugees, signed in Geneva on 28 July 1951
  - Protocol Relating to the Status of Refugees, signed in New York on 1 January 1967.
- Vienna Convention on Consular Relations — Article 36 requires that foreign nationals who are arrested or detained be given notice, "without delay," of their right to have their embassy or consulate notified of that arrest.
- Hague Adoption Convention, signed 29 May 1993

== Current laws regarding administration ==
Department of Citizenship and Immigration Act

Parliament of Canada
- Long title: An Act to establish the Department of Citizenship and Immigration and to make consequential amendments to other Acts
- Citation: S.C. 1994, c. 31
- Assented to: 23 June 1994
- Status: Amended

=== Department of Citizenship and Immigration ===
The Department of Citizenship and Immigration Act established Canada's Department of Citizenship and Immigration (now known as Immigration, Refugees and Citizenship Canada), to be presided by the minister of citizenship and immigration.

The Revolving Funds Act authorized the establishment of certain revolving funds, including for the minister of citizenship and immigration. Under the act, the minister is able to make expenditures out of the Consolidated Revenue Fund of Canada "for the purpose of passport and other travel document services in Canada and at posts abroad," as well as revenue received regarding that purpose.

Canada Border Services Agency Act

Parliament of Canada
- Long title: An Act to establish the Canada Border Services Agency
- Citation: S.C. 2005, c. 38
- Assented to: 3 November 2005
- Status: Amended

=== Canada Border Services Agency ===
The Canada Border Services Agency Act established the Canada Border Services Agency (CBSA), which was created by Order in Council on 12 December 2003. The act renders the CBSA responsible for providing integrated border services that support Canada's national security priorities and that facilitate the free flow of persons and goods (including plants and animals) that meet all requirements under the program legislation.

The act also set out the responsibilities, mandate, powers, duties, and functions of the CBSA's president and of the minister responsible for the agency (Minister of Public Safety and Emergency Preparedness).

International Boundary Commission Act

Parliament of Canada
- Long title: An Act respecting the International Boundary Commission
- Citation: R.S.C., 1985, c. I-16
- Status: Amended

=== Immigration and Refugee Board ===
Sections 151 through 186 of the Immigration and Refugee Protection Act (IRPA) dictate the functions and composition of the Immigration and Refugee Board of Canada (IRB).

The Immigration Division Rules (SOR/2002-229), pursuant to subsection 161(1) of IRPA, outlines the responsibilities of the IRB's Immigration Division, including those of admissibility hearings and detention reviews.

The Immigration Appeal Division Rules (SOR/2002-230), sets out the rules for appealing immigration- related decisions (such as removal orders, inadmissibility, etc.) to IRB's Immigration Appeal Division. Likewise, the Refugee Appeal Division Rules (SOR/2012-257) sets out the rules for appealing refugee-related decisions to the Refugee Appeal Division.

=== International Boundary Commission ===
The International Boundary Commission Act provides the International Boundary Commission (including its members, officers, employees, and agents) with certain powers for the purpose of maintaining an effective boundary line between Canada and the United States. This authority includes the commission's ability to:

- "enter on and pass over the land of any person in order to gain access to the boundary or to survey the boundary;"
- "erect and maintain boundary monuments on the land of any person;" and
- "clear from the land of any person such trees and underbrush as the Commission deems necessary to maintain a vista ten feet in width from the boundary."

== Case law ==
- 1865. Re Burley
- 1985. Singh v Canada
- 1991. Kindler v Canada (Minister of Justice)
- 1991. Reference Re Ng Extradition
- 1992. Canada (Minister of Employment and Immigration) v Chiarelli
- 1992. Canadian Council of Churches v Canada (Minister of Employment and Immigration)
- 1993. Canada (AG) v Ward
- 1998. Pushpanathan v Canada (Minister of Citizenship and Immigration)
- 1999. Baker v Canada (Minister of Citizenship and Immigration)
- 2001. Law Society of British Columbia v Mangat
- 2001. United States v Burns
- 2002. Ahani v Canada (Minister of Citizenship and Immigration)
- 2002. Suresh v Canada (Minister of Citizenship and Immigration)
- 2007. Charkaoui v Canada (Minister of Citizenship and Immigration)
- 2005. Mugesera v Canada (Minister of Citizenship and Immigration)
- 2006. Hinzman v Canada, 2006 FC 420 — the case of Jeremy Hinzman
- 2009. Canada (Minister of Citizenship and Immigration) v Khosa
- 2010. Jose Figueroa deportation case
- 2019. Canada (Minister of Citizenship and Immigration) v Vavilov

== Terminology ==
Most terminology relevant to immigration and refugee law in Canada are defined under the Immigration and Refugee Protection Act (IRPA) and its accompanying regulations; such terms include:

- Foreign national (French: étranger) — "a person who is not a Canadian citizen or a permanent resident, and includes a stateless person."
  - Designated foreign national (étranger désigné) — a foreign national who belongs to a group of persons who arrive in Canada together and are designated by the minister of public safety and emergency preparedness to be an "irregular arrival" (i.e., have illegally entered Canada). s. 20.1. This can occur, for instance, if the minister suspects that the persons were brought to Canada through human smuggling or trafficking with the help of a criminal or terrorist organization.
- Permanent resident (résident permanent) — "a person who has acquired permanent resident status and has not subsequently lost that status under section 46." A permanent resident has the right to live permanently in Canada, but can be ordered to leave Canada for reasons under IRPA.
- Convention refugees (United Nations definition) — "people who have a well-founded fear of persecution based on race, religion, political opinion, nationality, or membership in a particular social group." (The UN's definition of a 'Convention refugee' has been adopted into Canadian law.)
- Protected person — "a person on whom refugee protection is conferred ... and whose claim or application has not subsequently been deemed to be rejected under subsection 108(3), 109(3) or 114(4)" of IRPA. s. 95(2).
- Person in need of protection — "a person in Canada who would be subjected personally to a danger of torture, a risk to their life, or a risk of cruel and unusual treatment or punishment if they were returned to their home country." s. 97.
- Removal order — an official order for a person to leave Canada. There are 3 types of removal orders:
  - Exclusion order — a type of removal order in which the subject may not return to Canada for one year. If the reason for the exclusion order was "misrepresentation," then the subject cannot return for 5 years. "Misrepresentation" refers to the providing of information that is not true or accurate, or the omission of required information.
  - Departure order — a type of removal order in which the subject must leave Canada within 30 days, and must inform the Canada Border Services Agency (CBSA) when they leave.
  - Deportation order — a type of removal order in which the subject may not return to Canada unless they have received an "Authorization to Return to Canada," i.e., permission in writing from Immigration, Refugees and Citizenship Canada.

=== Admission classes ===
Under Canadian policy, (legal) permanent immigrants are categorized by Immigration, Refugees and Citizenship Canada (IRCC) as either of the following:

1. Family: persons closely related to one or more Canadian residents who live in Canada. The Family class allows permanent residents or citizens to sponsor a family member's or spouse's entrance into the country. In the case of a same-sex couple, if they are immigrating from a country where they cannot marry, proof of a long-term relationship is required.
2. Economic: skilled workers, caregivers, or business persons. The Economic class provides admission to applicants (and their immediate families) who are supposed to be likely to find employment and contribute to the Canadian economy. This is determined by ranking candidates against one another, and the weighing of factors such as education, language skills, and work experience. Some 60,000 come to Canada each year under the International Experience Canada initiative, which provides Working Holiday, internship, and study visas.
3. Protected person or Refugee: persons who are escaping persecution, torture, and/or cruel and unusual punishment. Any migrant can claim to be a refugee and it will be investigated. Claims for refugee status and for admissibility as well as appeals of the decisions of the immigration officers are directed to the Immigration and Refugee Board of Canada (IRB). The IRB is the largest tribunal in Canada and hears over 25,000 claims a year. Decision of the IRB can be appealed to the Federal Court, which hears about 2,500 appeals on immigration and refugee matters a year.
4. Humanitarian or other: persons accepted as immigrants for humanitarian or compassionate reasons. This category includes broadly defined humanitarian and compassionate grounds such as specific hardships that applicants would face if they were to return to their home countries. Individuals must receive permission to apply.

== Other relevant laws and systems ==
- Canadian Passport Order (1981) — superseded the Canadian Passport Regulations and established the Passport Office (later Passport Canada). As of 2 July 2013, primary responsibility for Passport Canada and the administration of the Canadian Passport Order moved from the Department of Foreign Affairs to IRCC.
- Canadian Citizenship Act (1946)
- Citizenship Act (1981)
- Private Sponsorship of Refugees Program

== Issues ==
The Parliament of Canada has previously debated whether to allow former U.S. war resisters, such as soldiers avoiding re-deployment to Iraq, to stay in Canada. In mid-2010, the Federal Court of Appeal ruled that Jeremy Hinzman, an American soldier seeking asylum, should be allowed to remain in Canada based on his pacifist religious beliefs. A Private Member's Bill on the issue of war resisters, by former Member of Parliament Gerard Kennedy, was defeated in late September.

In June 2012, the Canadian government introduced a series of changes affecting the Interim Federal Health Program which covers refugee health care. Some have taken issue with the Canada–United States Safe Third Country Agreement (STCA), which prevents people from a country that is not Canada or the US who attempt to enter Canada at a legal border crossing seeking refugee status will be turned back, but processes the claims of those who arrive illegally. Moreover, some refugee advocates have argued for rescinding the STCA.

== See also ==
- Immigration to Canada
- Visa policy of Canada
- Canadian nationality law
  - Provincial Nomination Program
  - Temporary foreign worker program
  - Canada permanent resident card
- Vietnam War resisters in Canada
- Iraq War resisters in Canada
