= Section 6 of the Canadian Charter of Rights and Freedoms =

Constitutional provision protecting mobility rights

Section 6 of the Canadian Charter of Rights and Freedoms is the section of the Canadian Constitution that protects the mobility rights of Canadian citizens, and to a lesser extent that of permanent residents. By mobility rights, the section refers to the individual practice of entering and exiting Canada, and moving within its boundaries. The section is subject to the section 1 Oakes test, but cannot be nullified by the notwithstanding clause.

Along with the language rights in the Charter (sections 16–23), section 6 was meant to protect Canadian unity.

== Text ==
Under the heading "Mobility Rights", the section reads,

6. (1) Every citizen of Canada has the right to enter, remain in and leave Canada.

(2) Every citizen of Canada and every person who has the status of a permanent resident of Canada has the right

a) to move to and take up residence in any province; and
b) to pursue the gaining of a livelihood in any province.

(3) The rights specified in subsection (2) are subject to

a) any laws or practices of general application in force in a province other than those that discriminate among persons primarily on the basis of province of present or previous residence; and
b) any laws providing for reasonable residency requirements as a qualification for the receipt of publicly provided social services.

(4) Subsections (2) and (3) do not preclude any law, program or activity that has as its object the amelioration in a province of conditions of individuals in that province who are socially or economically disadvantaged if the rate of employment in that province is below the rate of employment in Canada.

== Background ==
Before the adoption of the Charter in 1982, mobility rights had existed by virtue of section 91 of the Constitution Act, 1867, which gave the federal government full jurisdiction over citizenship. Citizens were free to move across provincial borders and live wherever they chose to. Only the federal government could limit this right. This implied right was recognized by the Supreme Court in Winner v. S.M.T. (Eastern) Limited, where Rand J. observed:

What this implies is that a province cannot, by depriving a Canadian of the means of working, force him to leave it: it cannot divest him of his right or capacity to remain and to engage in work there: that capacity inhering as a constituent element of his citizenship status is beyond nullification by provincial action. The contrary view would involve the anomaly that although British Columbia could not by mere prohibition deprive a naturalized foreigner of his means of livelihood, it could do so to a native-born Canadian. He may, of course, disable himself from exercising his capacity or he may be regulated in it by valid provincial law in other aspects. But that attribute of citizenship lies outside of those civil rights committed to the province, and is analogous to the capacity of a Dominion corporation which the province cannot sterilize.

It follows, a fortiori, that a province cannot prevent a Canadian from entering it except, conceivably, in temporary circumstances, for some local reason as, for example, health. With such a prohibitory power, the country could be converted into a number of enclaves and the "union" which the original provinces sought and obtained disrupted. In a like position is a subject of a friendly foreign country; for practical purposes he enjoys all the rights of the citizen.

Such, then, is the national status embodying certain inherent or constitutive characteristics, of members of the Canadian public, and it can be modified, defeated or destroyed, as for instance by outlawry, only by Parliament.

Aside from this, section 121 of the Constitution Act, 1867 allows for goods to be freely moved from province to province. Before the patriation of the Constitution in 1982 the governments considered extending this section to allow mobility rights for individuals. However, today the two sections are considered to be geared toward separate purposes. Section 121 remains concerned with keeping Canada economically united, and section 6 is primarily concerned with an individual's freedom of movement.

The Supreme Court has compared section 6 to section 2(a) of the 1960 Canadian Bill of Rights, which bars "the arbitrary detention, imprisonment or exile of any person." However, section 6 expands on this right to also protect rights to leave and move within Canada.

== Purpose ==
Along with the language rights in the Charter (sections 16–23), section 6 was meant to protect Canadian unity. French Canadians, who have been at the centre of unity debates, are able to travel throughout all Canada and receive government and educational services in their own language. Hence, they are not confined to Quebec (the only province where they form the majority and where most of their population is based), which would polarize the country along regional lines.

According to the Supreme Court in Canadian Egg Marketing Agency v. Richardson (1998), section 6 is also "rooted in a concern with human rights." It allows for individual independence and thus dignity. This contrasts with implied mobility rights under the Constitution Act, 1867. Section 6 also grants Canadians economic rights, but only insofar as one has equal rights to pursue work. The safeguards against discrimination in subsection 6(3) shows mobility rights are "largely predicated on the right to equal treatment." This was connected with mobility rights in the Universal Declaration of Human Rights, which, under article 2, are guaranteed "without distinction of any kind, such as race, colour, sex, language, religion, political or other opinion, national or social origin, property, birth or other status."

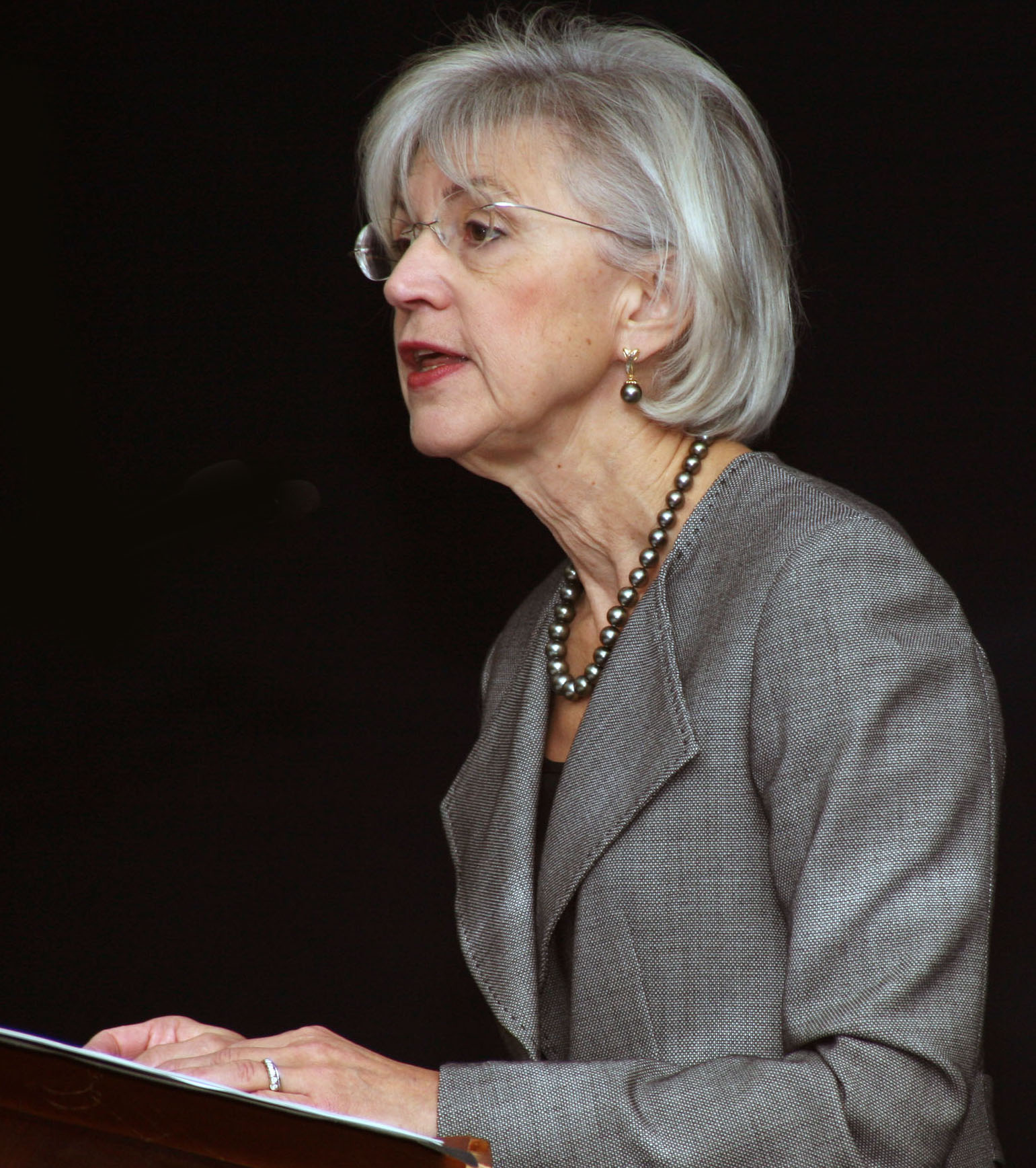
Justice Beverley McLachlin argued section 6 is intended to promote the economic union of Canada.

Dissenting in Canadian Egg Marketing Agency v. Richardson, Justice Beverley McLachlin wrote that section 6 is not only meant to protect individual rights but also to "promote economic union among the provinces," and in this way was related to section 121 of the Constitution Act, 1867. A person's mobility rights are a natural consequence of having a unified economy, though section 6, motivated by rights concerns, also expands these mobility rights to guard against discrimination.

When the Charter was negotiated in 1981, there was general agreement that section 6 would not affect extradition. As one politician named Mr. Tassé explained,

Perhaps I might mention that we do not see Clause 6 as being an absolute right: I will give you an example of a situation where a citizen would, in effect, lose his right to remain in the country: that would be by virtue of an order under the Extradition Act: if someone committed an offence in another country and he is sought in this country, he could be surrendered to the other country.

This interpretation was upheld by the Supreme Court of Canada in 2012 in Sriskandarajah v. United States of America. The application of extradition laws to try individuals in countries where constitutional standards are lower or sentences higher remains a controversial practice, and was used by the Canadian government against Holocaust denier Ernst Zundel, alleged war criminal Michael Seifert, and marijuana seed vendor Marc Emery, none of whom were convicted of a crime in Canada. Canadian courts have demonstrated an ongoing lack of willingness to apply constitutional remedies in such cases.

== Application ==
Some rights in the Charter, such as freedom of expression in section 2, are held by any person in Canada, including a corporation. Other rights, like those in section 23, are limited to certain citizens. Section 6 rights to enter and exit Canada, and to move within its boundaries are held by citizens, but rights to move within its boundaries and to pursue employment in another province are also held by permanent residents. Permanent residents are those described in the 1977 Immigration Act as "a person who (a) has been granted landing, (b) has not become a Canadian citizen..." This definition would exclude corporations. If the Supreme Court defined permanent residency as simply living in Canada permanently, a corporation might have rights under section 6, since for the purposes of income taxes corporations already are considered "residents". However, the Supreme Court might be unwilling to do this, due to tradition that corporations only have full rights in the province where their corporate status was first recognized.

Subsection 6(2) refers to moving from province to province. By virtue of section 30, however, this can also be interpreted as granting a right to move to and from the territories. During the COVID-19 pandemic in Canada, some anti-mask activists have tried to use Section 6 to avoid mandatory testing upon arrival back into Canada.

== Subsection 6(1) ==
Like section 7, section 6 is relevant to laws dealing with extradition. The precedent, however, has been that even though extradition violates section 6, it is usually justifiable under section 1. Allowing for Canadians to be extradited has been legally upheld in Canada since before Confederation; Sir William Buell Richards approved of it in Re Burley in 1865 as a matter of treaty law.

In United States of America v. Cotroni (1989) it was found extradition violates section 6 rights to stay in Canada, but fighting illegal activities was considered important under a section 1 test, and in Kindler v. Canada (Minister of Justice) (1991) it was added that Canada should not attract criminals seeking to escape harsher foreign laws. In the case Re Federal Republic of Germany and Rauca, an extradition of an individual so old that he would probably die in prison, was technically a denial of his rights to return to Canada as well as to stay, but it was upheld; likewise, in United States v. Burns, it was found extradition of Canadian citizens who might face the death penalty violated section 6 but this was justifiable under section 1, despite arguments that their citizenship and consequent section 6 rights against exile reinforced their rights under section 7 (the rights claimants won their case anyway, but under section 7). Since Canada v. Schmidt, it is indeed rights to fundamental justice under section 7 that are generally used to evaluate whether a particular case of extradition is fair.

== Subsection 6(2) ==
Section 6 has also been held to protect the right of a person to be employed outside his or her resident province. Specifically, in the Supreme Court case Law Society of Upper Canada v. Skapinker (1984), it was found that one does not actually have to settle in another province to be able to invoke section 6(2) (b) rights to "pursue the gaining of a livelihood in any province."

== Subsections 6(3) and (4) ==
Section 6(2), the rights of citizens and permanent residents to move to and pursue work in any province, has a number of limits provided by sections 6(3) and (4). Section 6(3) apparently recognized and affirmed laws that limited rights to pursue certain careers for persons who had recently entered the province. As Professor Peter Hogg remarked in 1982, when section 6 came into force, some of the laws upheld by section 6(3) could even be discriminatory towards a person based upon where he or she had moved from; this discrimination only becomes unconstitutional when it is "primarily" the reason for the limits on section 6(2) rights. Section 6(3)(b) addresses rights to social services, suggesting that a denial of services to persons who have newly arrived should be "reasonable."

Subsection 6(3) thus requires a comparative analysis to determine if there is discrimination. This may be a difficult analysis to perform given that one can pursue work in a number of different ways, but in general a newcomer will be compared with those who have lived in the province for longer. Laws and regulations that appear neutral on their face, but in fact are meant to allow discrimination in practice or have discriminatory consequences, are also considered to violate section 6. This is the same approach the Supreme Court has taken to equality rights in section 15 of the Charter.

Section 6(4) was added to the Charter in November 1981 to appease the government of Newfoundland and Labrador, making it possible to allow Newfoundlanders who had been in the province for longer a better opportunity to find work in offshore oil than newcomers. This limit allowing for disparity in opportunity applies anywhere else where unemployment in the province is worse than in the country as a whole.

== Comparison with other human rights instruments ==
As the Supreme Court noted in Canadian Egg Marketing Agency v. Richardson, section 6 is connected with similar provisions in international bills of rights that Canada has recognized. The Universal Declaration of Human Rights (1948), for example, states under article 13 that "Everyone has the right to freedom of movement and residence within the borders of each State," and under article 23 that "Everyone has the right to work, to free choice of employment, to just and favourable conditions of work and to protection against unemployment." Later, the International Covenant on Economic, Social and Cultural Rights recognized under article 6 that "the right to work, which includes the right of everyone to the opportunity to gain his living by work which he freely chooses or accepts."

In United States of America v. Cotroni, the Court wrote that "the International Covenant on Political Rights, Article 12... contains no right to remain in one's own country, although it contains all the other rights listed in ss. 6(1) and 6(2)(a) of the Charter."
