= Reference Re Ng Extradition =

- Supreme Court of Canada

Hearing: February 21, 1991 Judgment: September 26, 1991
- Citations: [1991] 2 SCR 858
- Docket No.: 21990

Court membership
- Chief Justice: Antonio Lamer; Puisne Justices: Bertha Wilson, Gérard La Forest, Claire L'Heureux-Dubé, John Sopinka, Charles Gonthier, Peter Cory, Beverley McLachlin, William Stevenson

Reasons given
- Majority: La Forest J., joined by L'Heureux-Dubé and Gonthier JJ.
- Concurrence: McLachlin J., joined by L'Heureux-Dubé and Gonthier JJ.
- Dissent: Sopinka J., joined by Lamer C.J.
- Dissent: Cory J.

Reference Re Ng Extradition was a 1991 case in which the Supreme Court of Canada held that it was permissible to extradite Charles Ng, a fugitive, to the United States, where he was wanted on charges of several murders and might face the death penalty. The issue came before the court in the form of a reference from the federal government, which asked the court for an advisory opinion as to whether the extradition of a fugitive threatened with execution would violate the Canadian Charter of Rights and Freedoms.

Along with the Kindler case, the ruling in Re Ng Extradition was essentially overturned in 2001 with United States v. Burns. In Burns, the Supreme Court found extraditing people to countries in which they might face the death penalty breached fundamental justice under the Charter.

In 1998, Ng was convicted by a jury in California of eleven counts of murder and sentenced to death. As of March 2022, official California Department of Corrections and Rehabilitation records show Ng still waits on death row, where no executions have taken place since 2006.

== Background ==
Charles Chi-Tat Ng was wanted by the State of California on multiple counts of murder, kidnapping, and burglary, for which he potentially faced the death penalty. After his accomplice Leonard Lake confessed to their crimes—and committed suicide—Ng fled to Canada.

On July 6, 1985, in Calgary, Alberta, he was caught shoplifting. While resisting arrest, he shot a security guard in the hand. The United States petitioned the government to have Ng extradited. Ng submitted a habeas corpus request, which was denied, followed by an application to the Alberta Court of Appeal and the Supreme Court of Canada, all of which were denied.

In response to requests to gain an assurance from the United States government not to seek the death penalty, the Minister of Justice submitted the following questions to the Supreme Court:

1. Is s. 25 of the Extradition Act, to the extent that it permits the Minister of Justice to order the surrender of a fugitive for a crime for which the fugitive may be or has been sentenced to death in the foreign state without first obtaining assurances from the foreign state that the death penalty will not be imposed, or, if imposed, will not be executed, inconsistent with ss. 7 or 12 of the Canadian Charter of Rights and Freedoms?
2. If the answer to question 1 is in the affirmative, is s. 25 of the Extradition Act, a reasonable limit of the rights of a fugitive within the meaning of s. 1 of the Canadian Charter of Rights and Freedoms, and therefore not inconsistent with the Constitution Act, 1982?

== Ruling ==
The Court answered both questions in the negative. There were two majority opinions in the case, written by Gérard La Forest and Beverley McLachlin, with Claire L'Heureux-Dubé and Charles Gonthier concurring with both. Both majority opinions referred to Kindler v. Canada (1991), where the Court considered the same question and found that there was no Charter violation.

Antonio Lamer, John Sopinka, and Peter Cory dissented on both questions. Cory concluded that without any assurance from the United States against imposing the death sentence, there would be a clear violation of s.12 of the Charter, which could not be saved under s.1. Sopinka's opinion referred to s.7 of the Charter but reached the same conclusion as Cory.

== See also ==
- List of Supreme Court of Canada cases
