= Section 26 =

Section 26 may refer to:

- Section 26, one of the supporters groups of Real Salt Lake
- Section 26 of the Canadian Charter of Rights and Freedoms
