= Anthony Serka =

Canadian lawyer (born 1944)

Anthony P. ("Tony") Serka, QC (born 1944) is a British Columbia lawyer who has appeared as counsel on several significant and high profile criminal cases, including in the Supreme Court of Canada. In R. v. Hutt, [1978] 2 S.C.R. 476, Serka acted for a Vancouver woman accused of soliciting. As a result of the court's decision, the meaning of the word "solicit" was narrowed. The case was noted by the Canadian Lawyer magazine to have been one of the rare decisions which left "lasting impressions on the legal and sociological landscape." Serka also appeared in R. v. Smith, [1987] 1 S.C.R. 1045, which was the first decision to deal with minimum sentencing laws after the advent of the Canadian Charter of Rights and Freedoms. Serka was successful in overturning the seven-year minimum sentence provision for importation of narcotics. In reaching its decision, the court in Smith elaborated on the meaning of "cruel and unusual punishment" under section 12 of the Charter.

Serka is a graduate of the University of British Columbia Faculty of Law and was called to the British Columbia Bar in 1970. He was appointed Queen's Counsel in 2002. He maintains his criminal practice in Vancouver.
