= R v Hutt =

Judgement of the Supreme Court of Canada

R v Hutt, [1978] 2 S.C.R. 476 is a leading Supreme Court of Canada decision. The Court held that for the activities of a prostitute or a customer to be of a criminal nature the conduct must conform with the ordinary dictionary meaning—i.e. The Oxford English Dictionary—since the word "solicit" was not defined in the Criminal Code.

The Court ruled that there must be “importuning”, or “pressing or persistent” conduct which must constitute more than a “mere” indication that the prostitute was willing to engage in an act of prostitution. In this case, an undercover Vancouver Police officer had permitted Hutt to enter his unmarked standard passenger vehicle whereupon Hutt proceeded to identify herself as a prostitute and to discuss the sexual service she would supply as well as the price for the service. On cross examination the police officer agreed that one of his duties was to make it appear as if he wanted a girl for sex and that the reason he immediately returned Hutt's smile while she was standing outside his automobile was to encourage her to solicit him for the purpose of prostitution.

The Court ruled that the conduct displayed in this case was certainly not within the scope of a criminal provision intended by Parliament to prohibit acts “which would contribute to public inconvenience.” Further four Judges of the Court also indicated that, had the issue been pursued, they would not have considered the automobile to be a “public place” within the definition contained in the Criminal Code, and therefore would have ruled that the conduct would not have been within section 195.1 on this ground either. Hutt was defended by Anthony P. Serka, a criminal lawyer based in Vancouver, and A. Rounthwaite.

== See also ==
- Prostitution law in Canada
- Street prostitution
