= Canada v Schmidt =

- Supreme Court of Canada

Hearing: December 18, 1985 Judgment: May 14, 1987
- Full case name: Helen Susan Schmidt v. Her Majesty The Queen in Right of Canada, the United States of America and the Attorney General for Ontario
- Citations: [1987] 1 S.C.R. 500, 61 O.R. (2d) 530, 28 C.R.R. 280, 58 C.R. (3d) 1, 20 O.A.C. 161
- Docket No.: 18343
- Prior history: Judgment for the Crown in the Court of Appeal for Ontario.
- Ruling: Appeal dismissed.

Holding
- Rules concerning double jeopardy in Canada do not apply to foreign states in extradition hearings.

Court membership
- Chief Justice: Brian Dickson; Puisne Justices: Jean Beetz, Willard Estey, William McIntyre, Julien Chouinard, Antonio Lamer, Bertha Wilson, Gerald Le Dain, Gérard La Forest

Reasons given
- Majority: La Forest J., joined by Dickson C.J. and Beetz, McIntyre, and Le Dain JJ.
- Concurrence: Lamer J.
- Concurrence: Wilson J.
- Estey and Chouinard JJ. took no part in the consideration or decision of the case.

Canada v Schmidt, [1987] 1 S.C.R. 500, is a decision by the Supreme Court of Canada on the applicability of fundamental justice under the Canadian Charter of Rights and Freedoms on extradition. While fundamental justice in Canada included a variety of legal protections, the Court found that in considering the punishments one might face when extradited to another country, only those that "shock the conscience" would breach fundamental justice.

== Background ==
The defendant was a Canadian citizen, Helen Susan Schmidt, who, along with her son Charles Gress and his friend Paul Hildebrand, had kidnapped a young girl in Cleveland, Ohio. Schmidt claimed to believe that the girl was her granddaughter and that the girl's biological mother kept her in a home ill-suited for a child. Helen Schmidt then lived with the girl for two years in New York City before her arrest in 1982. She was charged with kidnapping, a federal offence in the United States, and with child-stealing, a state offence in Ohio. The same year she was acquitted of kidnapping, but she had fled to Canada before her state trial commenced. She was captured in Ontario and was prepared to be extradited.

Being charged for child-stealing after having been acquitted of kidnapping would not violate the double jeopardy clause in the Fifth Amendment to the United States Constitution, as the states offences are considered separately from federal offences by the US Supreme Court, Schmidt fought the extradition as a violation of double jeopardy rights under section 11(h) of the Canadian Charter of Rights and Freedoms.

== Decision ==
The majority decision was written by Justice Gerard La Forest. After the Supreme Court found that it had jurisdiction to review the case, it considered whether extradition law aside from Charter law was violated. Under extradition law, a hearing in Canada would ascertain if there was sufficient evidence of a crime that could be criminal in Canada as well as in the other nation. It was argued that the extradition hearing should guard against double jeopardy since that was an essential right in Canadian law. However, the hearing is not a trial, and the Supreme Court decided that arguments about double jeopardy are a defence that would be more suited for a trial. The case Re Burley (1865) was cited to demonstrate that Canada should trust the receiving country to carry out the trial.

Moving on to consider section 11(h) of the Charter, the Court considered the argument that the crimes of kidnapping and child-stealing were too similar. The Court noted that while the Canadian government's decisions in extradition are bound by the Charter under section 32, the actions of a foreign government are not, which was relevant to section 11(h) since its rights are held against trials and the Canadian government would not be conducting the trial. The Court went on to argue that many other rights under section 11 would also be irrelevant to extradition. For example, section 11 guarantees the presumption of innocence, but in practice, Canada already extradites persons to countries that do not presume innocence.

Section 6 of the Charter, which provides mobility rights for Canadian citizens, was not considered because the Court had already dealt with the issue in Re Federal Republic of Germany and Rauca and found extradition could be a justified limit on rights against exile.

Finally, the Court considered section 7 of the Charter, which guarantees the right to life, liberty, and security of the person except when a deprivation of those rights, is in accordance with fundamental justice. The Court noted that the executive government's decisions to extradite, the extradition hearing, and even the treaty could be subject to section 7. The extradition itself could violate section 7 by putting a person at risk of having his or her rights breached.

The Court found that punishments in another country might be so excessive that the Canadian government should not put persons at risk by extraditing them there. For example, torture would be unacceptable, and to make that point the Court cited Altun v. Germany (1983), a case that was considered by the European Commission on Human Rights. In general, a potential punishment that "shocks the conscience" violates fundamental justice in extradition cases. However, the Court urged some deference to the executive government in those cases. Additionally, the fact that a foreign justice system would be very different from Canada's would not necessarily make it unjust. Compared to regular operations in another country, the variety of guarantees under fundamental justice in Canada could be seen as "finicky" and thus need not be considered in extradition cases. The presumption of innocence was one right the Court identified that if breached would not shock the conscience even though it is part of fundamental justice in Canada. The shocked conscience theory would also be less disruptive to efforts to ensure that fugitives meet justice.

Ultimately, Schmidt lost her case. While double jeopardy is a part of fundamental justice in Canada, La Forest wrote, "I do not think our constitutional standards can be imposed on other countries." The majority found that the charge would be in accordance with "traditional procedures" in Ohio. Finally, it noted, "It is interesting that, as we saw, the United States Supreme Court has repeatedly held that successive prosecutions at the federal and state level do not automatically offend against the due process clause, the spirit and content of which bears some resemblance to s. 7 of the Charter, although the courts would act to prevent oppressive behaviour."

== Concurrence ==
=== Lamer ===
A concurrence was written by Justice Antonio Lamer, who agreed that some potential punishments in extradition might breach fundamental justice. However, he felt that when one faces extradition hearings, one is a "person charged with an offence" and thus section 11 should apply. In an extradition hearing, a person should therefore have legal rights under the Charter, as the foreign government might not allow consideration of similar rights. Nevertheless, Lamer too would have decided against Schmidt because he felt that kidnapping and child-stealing were sufficiently-different crimes.

=== Wilson ===
An opinion was also given by Justice Bertha Wilson, who also would have ruled against Schmidt. She argued that a citizen "clearly can" claim rights under the Charter in an extradition hearing. Wilson felt the claim to rights under sections 11(h) and 7 were not made against Ohio but against the extradition court's decision that Schmidt should be held in prison in Canada before the government made a decision to extradite her. Still, Wilson decided that Schmidt "failed to establish that the offence in Ohio is the same offence as the offence under the United States Code."

== Aftermath ==
The case has been cited in a number of subsequent extradition cases, including Kindler v Canada (1991), which found potential that execution would not shock the conscience and United States v. Burns (2001), which overturned Kindler. In Suresh v Canada (Minister of Citizenship and Immigration) (2002), the Court ruled that a possibility of torture would shock the conscience. However, the use of the shocked conscience doctrine has not gone without criticism. Professor Peter Hogg, in noting how the definition of fundamental justice has been ambiguous and that the courts have taken on "enormous discretion," argues that a shocked conscience is particularly difficult to measure. He writes that cruel and unusual punishment, prohibited by section 12 of the Charter, should obviously be shocking potential punishments. Nonetheless, he observes, some potential punishments considered cruel and unusual in Canada have been considered acceptable in extradition, concluding that some punishments considered "cruel and unusual,... are not shocking or unacceptable!"
