= Section 30 =

Section 30 may refer to:

- Section 30 of the Canadian Charter of Rights and Freedoms
- Section 30 of the Constitution of Australia
- Section 30 of the Scotland Act
  - Request using such section for a Proposed second Scottish independence referendum#Section 30 Request

== Other ==
- Section Thirty, Minnesota
