= United States v Cotroni =

Decision by the Supreme Court of Canada

United States v Cotroni
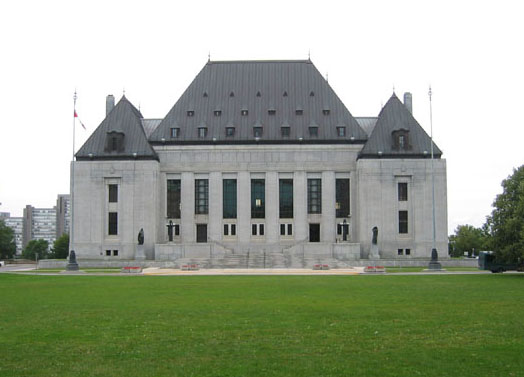

Supreme Court of Canada

Argued February 22–23, 1989

Decided June 8, 1989

Full case name:	United States of America v. Frank Santo Cotroni and between United States of America v. Samir El Zein
Citations:	[1989] 1 S.C.R. 1469; 1989 CanLII 106 (S.C.C.); (1989), 48 C.C.C. (3d) 193; (1989), [1990] 42 C.R.R. 101
Prior history:	Judgment for the defendants in the Quebec Court of Appeal.

Holding
Extradition of the respondents is justified; extradition is a minor issue regarding mobility rights.
Court membership

Chief Justice Brian Dickson
Puisne Justices Bertha Wilson, Gérard La Forest, Claire L'Heureux-Dubé, John Sopinka, Charles Gonthier, and Peter Cory

Case opinions

Majority by: La Forest
Joined by: Dickson, L'Heureux-Dubé, Gonthier and Cory
Dissent by: Wilson
Joined by: None
Dissent by: Sopinka
Joined by: None

United States v Cotroni [1989] 1 S.C.R. 1469 was a decision by the Supreme Court of Canada on extradition and freedom of movement under section 6 of the Canadian Charter of Rights and Freedoms. The Court found that extradition violates section 6 but is a justified infringement under section 1 of the Charter. The case was decided with United States v El Zein.

== Background ==
The case involved Frank Santo Cotroni, a Canadian citizen who was accused of planning to sell heroin in the United States. He was arrested in Canada and plans were made to extradite him. Cotroni resisted the extradition on the grounds that it was in violation of section 6(1) of the Charter, which grants Canadian citizens the right to stay in Canada. He won his case in the Quebec Court of Appeal, who argued that it was possible to try Cotroni in Canada, where the crime was centred.

The second respondent in the case was Samir El Zein, also a Canadian citizen, who gave heroin to two people in Canada who were then caught trying to cross the border with it. El Zein was arrested and the United States requested his extradition. El Zein also won his case in the Court of Appeal.

== Decision ==
When the case reached the Supreme Court, the appellants argued that section 6(1) should be interpreted in the way it was meant, to guard against arbitrary exile and not extradition, which may not be a permanent removal and does not terminate Canadian citizenship. Hansard from 1981, just before the implementation of the Charter, was cited to reinforce that point. Nevertheless, the Supreme Court majority decision, written by Gerard La Forest, cited Re B.C. Motor Vehicle Act (1985) to say the framers' intent was not binding in Charter case law. Rights can be given generous and liberal interpretations, and the right considered in this case was deemed to be important enough that limits would have to be justified.

It was noted the wording of section 6(1) was vague and, if given a straightforward reading, could be interpreted to provide rights against extradition, not just arbitrary banishment. Indeed, the Canadian Bill of Rights (1960) had provided a right against exile, and the Charter did not use that limited wording. Nevertheless, while extradition would violate section 6(1), it would not violate the primary principles underlying the right. European case law, in particular, was cited to show extradition and exile are different. Past Canadian case law, like Re Federal Republic of Germany and Rauca and obiter dicta in Canada v. Schmidt (1987) also indicated extradition was a violation but still a justified limit on section 6.

The Court then turned to section 1 of the Charter, which provides for reasonable limits on rights. Cotroni declined to argue that extradition was unreasonable under section 1 since precedent had already determined that it was reasonable. However, Cotroni argued extradition would be unreasonable in this particular case. El Zein's legal representation argued Canadian citizens should be held in Canada and that their trials should occur there. To determine the application of section 1, the Court used the test as set out by R v Oakes (1986). Everyone agreed that fighting crime would be an important objective for limiting a Charter right. Moreover, international co-operation was needed to do so because of globalization, and the Court made reference to the global village, envisioned by Canadian thinker Marshall McLuhan. The question was then whether the infringement of the right was rational and as small as reasonably possible. The respondents claimed that it was not, since they were Canadian, had most of the crimes taken place in Canada, and could be tried in Canada. The Supreme Court acknowledged that Canada could justifiably try the respondents itself but the US was justified to try the respondents as well and would have absorbed most of the negative impact of the crime. Extradition was therefore rational since "It is often better that a crime be prosecuted where its harmful impact is felt and where the witnesses and the persons most interested in bringing the criminal to justice reside." Even if extradition may not be the smallest possible limit on the right, the government was allowed some flexibility and extradition simply did not strike at the primary values of section 6. That conclusion was reinforced by the fact that extradition has long been practiced in Canada, and Re Burley (1865) showed that criminals should receive "little leniency" in extradition cases.

== Dissent ==
=== Wilson ===
A dissent was written by Justice Bertha Wilson. She concurred that extradition would violate section 6 but felt that extradition in this case would not be justified under section 1. She emphasized the importance of rights and consequent high expectations for limits. The precedent in Rauca and Canada v. Schmidt had not dealt with a case in which most of the criminal activity had occurred in Canada, and this case was different since the defendants could be tried in Canada. She also complained the decision to treat extradition as a minor section 6 issue leaves little work for section 1.

=== Sopinka ===
Another dissent was written by Justice John Sopinka. He largely agreed with Wilson but stressed that the view of extradition as a minor section 6 issue was wrong because of "the spectrum of nations to which a citizen can be extradited." Some countries do not have many of the legal rights that Canada has, and as a result, extradition can be a weighty issue. He also expressed fear that the precedent established by Canada v Schmidt, that fundamental justice can be breached by considering the potential punishments faced by an extradited person, might be at risk since the Court had concluded extradition was generally reasonable.
