= United States v Burns =

- Supreme Court of Canada

Hearing: May 23, 2000 Judgment: February 15, 2001
- Full case name: Minister of Justice v Glen Sebastian Burns and Atif Ahmad Rafay
- Citations: [2001] 1 SCR 283, 2001 SCC 7, 195 DLR (4th) 1, [2001] 3 WWR 193, 151 CCC (3d) 97, 39 CR (5th) 205, 81 CRR (2d) 1, 85 BCLR (3d) 1
- Docket No.: 26129
- Prior history: Judgment for the respondents in the Court of Appeal for British Columbia.

Holding
- Extradition without guarantees that the extradited person will not face the death penalty may be a breach of section 7 of the Canadian Charter of Rights and Freedoms and cannot be upheld under section 1.

Court membership
- Chief Justice: Beverley McLachlin; Puisne Justices: Claire L'Heureux-Dubé, Charles Gonthier, Frank Iacobucci, John C. Major, Michel Bastarache, Ian Binnie, Louise Arbour, Louis LeBel

Reasons given
- Unanimous reasons by: The Court

United States v Burns [2001] 1 S.C.R. 283, 2001 SCC 7, was a decision by the Supreme Court of Canada that found that the extradition of individuals to countries in which they may face the death penalty is a breach of fundamental justice under section 7 of the Canadian Charter of Rights and Freedoms. The decision reached that conclusion by a discussion of evidence regarding the arbitrary nature of execution, although the Court did not go so far as to say that execution was also unconstitutional under section 12 of the Charter, which forbids cruel and unusual punishments.

The case essentially overruled Kindler v Canada (Minister of Justice) (1991) and Reference Re Ng Extradition (1991). In Burns, the Supreme Court justices claimed to be considering different kinds of evidence.

== Background ==
The police department in Bellevue, Washington, of the United States, accused two Canadian citizens, Glen Sebastian Burns and Atif Ahmad Rafay, of murdering Rafay's family. After returning to Canada, Burns and Rafay confessed to the undercover Royal Canadian Mounted Police. The RCMP used the Mr. Big tactic to extract the confessions, a practice that is illegal in the United States but legal in Canada. After the investigation was complete, Burns and Rafay claimed their confessions were false, highly manipulated, and that jurors were biased by the media coverage of the crime. Nonetheless, plans were made to extradite Burns and Rafay to Washington, where capital punishment was still practiced until 2018.

The extradition would be possible through an extradition treaty under which the Minister of Justice for Canada may seek assurances that the fugitive accused would not be subject to the death penalty. However, the Minister of Justice did not seek assurances in the case. Burns and Rafay launched a number of Charter challenges to the Canadian government's decision, including that section 6 mobility rights provided them rights against extradition and to be charged in Canada (since the murders occurred in the US, Canada could only charge them with planning the crime, so this option was ruled out).

It was further argued that, while the Kindler case had held that it was not a breach of fundamental justice to extradite persons regardless of the risk of execution, the Burns case was special because it involved Canadian citizens; section 6 rights against exile were used to reinforce this argument.

== Decision ==
The decision of the Court was unanimous and anonymously written, and held that extradition in this case, involving the risk of execution, would indeed be unconstitutional under the Charter. Indeed, the government of Canada should always try to avoid execution, except in "exceptional circumstances" (likely to mean crimes against humanity). However, the Court rejected any arguments made under section 6 by citing precedent that while extradition, in and of itself, violates section 6, this was permissible under the reasonable limits clause in section 1 of the Charter. The Court also found it useful to cite the case Re Federal Republic of Germany and Rauca. Since the rights claimant in that case was extradited even though he was so old he would probably die in prison, and thus his rights to return to Canada would be constitutionally denied, in this case, constitutional denial of Burns and Rafay's rights to return to Canada as well made sense — as, whether executed or given a life sentence, Burns and Rafay, if convicted, were not expected to return.

The Court also declined to consider the case on the basis of the section 12 ban on cruel and unusual punishments. This was because section 32 makes section 12 binding only on punishments dispensed by the Canadian government, not the US government. While Burns might then be of little relevance to a section 12 debate if the Canadian government restored the death penalty in Canada, the Court did hint that execution "engages the underlying values of the prohibition against cruel and unusual punishment," noting its impossibility to correct (in cases of wrongful conviction) and its perceived arbitrary nature.

While section 12 was of little direct consequence in Burns, there was precedent that the government of Canada has some responsibility to consider possible outcomes of extradition under section 7 of the Charter (and section 12, like other legal rights, helps to define the broad principles of section 7).

Section 7 guarantees rights to life, liberty , and security of the person, to be deprived only with respect to fundamental justice. The applicability of section 7 was thus evident through the infringement of Burns and Rafay's right to life, liberty, and security of the person, since "Their lives are potentially at risk."

Extradition might then breach fundamental justice because, according to precedent in Canada v Schmidt, if the harm faced by the extradited persons is serious enough, it "shocks the conscience" of the Canadian population. Still, the Kindler case had indicated that extradition, regardless of the risk of execution, was not a breach of section 7. The Court in Burns thus had to overrule this.

While acknowledging Kindler's "balancing process", the Court wrote that various factors considered in this process will change with the times, and in this case the Court was confronted with more of the "practical and philosophic difficulties associated with the death penalty".

In considering the relationship between fundamental justice and execution, the Court wrote that "philosophic" views of fundamental justice that viewed execution as "inconsistent with the sanctity of human life" were not subject to judicial review, and that the Court could instead consider more legal issues such as "the protection of the innocent, the avoidance of miscarriages of justice, and the rectification of miscarriages of justice where they are found to exist." Hence wrongful convictions were especially to be feared in cases involving execution.

There were arguments that allowing a risk of execution could be compatible with fundamental justice, since the accused had committed a crime in another state and thus no longer had the benefits of Canadian law, and since states should work together to fight crime. However, there were also arguments that this extradition was contrary to fundamental justice. These included that execution no longer existed in Canada itself, and the legal importance of this state of affairs was reinforced by 40 years of continuity.

The Court also cited Reference Re BC Motor Vehicle Act to note that international law was important in defining fundamental justice, and while there was no international law against execution per se, international politics are moving in that direction, and more and more states have abolished the death penalty.

The Court paid a fair amount of attention to the risk of wrongful conviction, and how the Court had a duty to protect the innocent. This duty is based in part on section 11 of the Charter, which includes a right to, for example, presumption of innocence. To illustrate this point, cases of wrongful convictions were cited from Canada (the case of Donald Marshall, Jr. was specifically mentioned), the US and the United Kingdom.

While "[t]hese miscarriages of justice of course represent a tiny and wholly exceptional fraction of the workload of Canadian courts in murder cases," the Court wrote, "where capital punishment is sought, the state's execution of even one innocent person is one too many." The Court also acknowledged the "death row phenomenon" as a section 7 concern, noting the psychological stress that would be involved if one is sentenced to die.

The Court cited statements from parliament on capital punishment. The judgement noted that parliament abolished the last death penalty under Canadian law in 1998 with amendments to the National Defence Act. The court cited statements by the Cabinet to characterize this and other acts of Parliament. "In his letter to the respondents, the Minister of Justice emphasized that 'in Canada, Parliament has decided that capital punishment is not an appropriate penalty for crimes committed here...'."

In balancing the arguments that this extradition could be compatible or contrary to fundamental justice, the Court concluded that many of the goals of the Crown could have been met even if Canada had requested that the US would not seek the death penalty. There was thus an infringement of section 7, and the Court then had to consider whether it could be justified under section 1. The Court ruled the infringement was not justified.

While the government had a sufficient objective for infringing the right, namely working with the US cooperatively to fight crime and to keep good relations with the US, it was not necessary to risk execution for these objectives to be met. Asking that the death penalty should not be sought should not hurt relations with the US because the extradition treaty allows for this. There was also a concern about keeping dangerous criminals out of Canada, but the Court replied that criminals might not find extradition with the risk of a life sentence more attractive than the risk of execution, and thus it was not proven criminals would flee to Canada.

== Resulting extradition and trial ==
In March 2001, less than a month after the ruling, Burns and Rafay were extradited to the United States, after assurances from prosecutors handling the case that they would not seek the death penalty. After numerous delays, the trial took place in 2004. Prosecutors said that Burns and Rafay plotted to kill Rafay's family, and share the money from an insurance policy, as well as the sale of the family home. Burns claimed that his confession to undercover RCMP officers that he and Rafay killed Rafay's family was the result of coercion by the police. Defense lawyers noted that no forensic evidence linked the two men to the crime.

In May 2004, both men were found guilty of three counts of murder and each was subsequently sentenced to three consecutive life sentences without the possibility of parole.

Burns's family immediately began to fight to have the case overturned on appeal, alleging numerous problems with the investigation and improper rulings by the judge. In 2007, Sebastian Burns's sister produced a documentary about coercion by police. The family is continuing its efforts, and a website has been posted that claims to debunk the entire case.

In July 2014, the Supreme Court of Canada ruled to limit the admissibility of evidence obtained in the sort of RCMP Mr. Big undercover operations that were used to obtain confessions from Burns and Rafay.

This ruling states that the admissibility of such evidence may be limited in cases of very young or vulnerable suspects. Burns and Rafay were among the youngest suspects ever targeted in an RCMP undercover operation. In late 2014, both men filed paperwork to seek an appeal in light of the 2014 Supreme Court of Canada decision. The murder was the subject of two episodes of the 2017 Netflix documentary-series The Confession Tapes and True Crime Garage podcasts.

== See also ==
- List of Supreme Court of Canada cases (McLachlin Court)
- Re Burley
- United States v Cotroni
