= Kindler v Canada (Minister of Justice) =

- Supreme Court of Canada

Hearing: 21 February 1991 Judgment: 26 September 1991
- Full case name: Joseph John Kindler v Mr John Crosbie, Minister of Justice and Attorney General of Canada
- Citations: [1991] 2 SCR 779
- Docket No.: 21321
- Prior history: APPEAL from Kindler v Canada (Minister of Justice, [1989] 2 FCR 492 (FCA)
- Ruling: Appeal dismissed

Court membership
- Chief Justice: Antonio Lamer; Puisne Justices: Gérard La Forest, Claire L'Heureux-Dubé, John Sopinka, Charles Gonthier, Peter Cory, Beverley McLachlin, William Stevenson, Frank Iacobucci

Reasons given
- Majority: La Forest JJ, joined by L'Heureux-Dubé and Gonthier JJ
- Concurrence: McLachlin J
- Dissent: Sopinka J, joined by Lamer CJ
- Dissent: Cory J
- Stevenson and Iacobucci JJ took no part in the consideration or decision of the case.

Kindler v Canada (Minister of Justice) was a landmark decision of the Supreme Court of Canada that held that the government policy that allowed for extradition of convicted criminals to a country in which they may face the death penalty was valid under the Canadian Charter of Rights and Freedoms. The Court repeated that finding in Reference re Ng Extradition in 1991. However, Kindler was essentially overruled in 2001 with United States v. Burns.

After being convicted of murder in Pennsylvania, Joseph Kindler escaped and fled to Canada. He was captured, escaped again, and was captured again. Kindler then fought his extradition. In a four-to-three decision the Court found that there was no violation of section 7 of the Charter (the right to life, liberty and security of person) or section 12 of the Charter (protection against cruel and unusual punishment). The case cited an earlier extradition decision, Canada v. Schmidt (1987), which stated that extradition may be unconstitutional under section 7 if it "shocks the conscience." In Kindler, the Court noted that while Canada itself had abolished the death penalty, Canada should respect that most other countries had not. That included the United States, with which Canada shared cultural connections and an easily-crossed border. Thus, extradition with the possibility of execution should not shock the conscience.

Kindler was ultimately returned to the United States. On December 8, 2009, the United States Supreme Court ruled in Beard v. Kindler that Kindler's flight from the United States constituted an abandonment of his right to appeal.
