= Wilseyville, California =

Unincorporated community in California, United States

Wilseyville
- Unincorporated community
- Location in California Wilseyville (the United States)
- Coordinates: 38°22′45″N 120°30′53″W
- Country: United States
- State: California
- County: Calaveras
- Elevation: 2,769 ft (844 m)

Wilseyville is an unincorporated community in Calaveras County, California, United States. It lies at an elevation of 2769 feet (844 m). Wilseyville's post office was established in 1947; it has the zip code 95257. Wilseyville was named after Lawrence A. Wilsey, an executive at the American Forest Products Company.

Wilseyville is notorious for being the location of the cabin where serial killers Leonard Lake and Charles Ng killed and disposed of some of their victims. Their spree ended in June 1985.

== Climate ==
Area has a Köppen Climate Classification of Csb, which is a dry-summer subtropical climate often referred to as "Mediterranean".

Climate data for Wilseyville, California
Month	Jan	Feb	Mar	Apr	May	Jun	Jul	Aug	Sep	Oct	Nov	Dec	Year
Mean daily maximum °F (°C)	51 (11)	58 (14)	60 (16)	67 (19)	75 (24)	84 (29)	91 (33)	91 (33)	86 (30)	76 (24)	61 (16)	50 (10)	71 (22)
Mean daily minimum °F (°C)	33 (1)	34 (1)	36 (2)	39 (4)	45 (7)	50 (10)	56 (13)	55 (13)	52 (11)	45 (7)	37 (3)	33 (1)	43 (6)
Average precipitation inches (cm)	9 (23)	7 (18)	7.2 (18)	4 (10)	1.8 (4.6)	0.6 (1.5)	0.2 (0.51)	0.2 (0.51)	0.7 (1.8)	2.4 (6.1)	6 (15)	7.7 (20)	46.7 (119)
Source: Weatherbase

== Demographics ==
Historical population
Census	Pop.	Note	%±

The United States Census Bureau defined Wilseyville as a census designated place (CDP) in 2023.
