= Singh v Minister of Employment and Immigration =

Supreme Court of Canada constitutional case

- Supreme Court of Canada

Hearing: 30 April, 1 May 1984 Judgment: 4 April 1985
- Full case name: Harbhajan Singh (Appellant) and Minister of Employment and Immigration (Respondent); Sadhu Singh Thandi (Appellant) and Minister of Employment and Immigration (Respondent); Paramjit Singh Mann (Appellant) and Minister of Employment and Immigration (Respondent); Kewal Singh (Appellant) and Minister of Employment and Immigration (Respondent); Charanjit Singh Gill (Appellant) and Minister of Employment and Immigration (Respondent); Indrani (Appellant) and Minister of Employment and Immigration (Respondent); Satnam Singh (Appellant) and Minister of Employment and Immigration (Respondent); Federation of Canadian Sikh Societies and Canadian Council of Churches (Interveners)
- Citations: [1985] 1 SCR 177
- Docket No.: 17904

Court membership
- Chief Justice: Brian Dickson
- Puisne Justices: Roland Ritchie; Jean Beetz; Willard Estey; William McIntyre; Julien Chouinard; Antonio Lamer; Bertha Wilson

Reasons given
- Plurality: (1) Wilson (Dickson and Lamer concurring) (paras. 1–80); (2) Beetz (Estey and McIntyre concurring) (paras. 81–126)
- Chouinard took no part in the consideration or decision of the case.
- Ritchie did not participate in the final disposition of the judgment.

Laws applied
- Canadian Charter of Rights and Freedoms; Canadian Bill of Rights

Singh v Minister of Employment and Immigration, [1985] 1 S.C.R. 177 is a 1985 case of the Supreme Court of Canada. It determined that refugee claimants had a constitutional right to an oral hearing, by the principles of fundamental justice. The judgment was an early decision under the Canadian Charter of Rights and Freedoms and was also decided under the Canadian Bill of Rights. It had a significant impact on immigration law, human rights law, constitutional law, and administrative law in Canada. The Singh decision resulted in amnesty being granted to tens of thousands of refugee claimants and sweeping reforms which gave Canada one of the most liberal and most expensive refugee systems in the world. The anniversary of the ruling, 4 April, has been observed in Canada as Refugee Rights Day.

== Background ==
=== Immigration policy ===
Canada took a strict view on immigration in the early 1970s. At this time the only way for a foreigner already inside Canada to become a permanent resident was through a claim to convention refugee status, and high numbers of claims led the Department of Employment and Immigration to believe that most were taking advantage of the system to stay and work in Canada. The department's resources were strained and there were delays in addressing legitimate cases. To alleviate this, the federal Parliament enacted section 71(1) of the Immigration Act, 1976, which stated that the Immigration Appeals Board (IAB) could refuse all claims that it believed did not have reasonable grounds on which to establish convention refugee status. Federal courts held that the applicant must demonstrate the probability of their victory in order to obtain a hearing, and this was upheld by the Supreme Court of Canada (SCC) in the 1982 case Kwiatkowsky v Minister of Employment and Immigration.

Professor Julius Grey, the lawyer for the unsuccessful appellant in Kwiatkowsky, later stated that there had been immediate controversy over the Supreme Court's decision in Kwiatkowsky, refugee status being an area of law where life and death were concerned, and the summary removal of refugees could violate Canada's international obligations. The system favoured the interests of the government, and a series of government-commissioned reports released in 1983–1985 (Note: These reports on Canada's immigration system are: Illegal Migrants in Canada a.k.a. Robertson Report, 1983; A New Refugee Status Determination Process for Canada a.k.a. Ratushny Report, 1984; and Refugee Determination in Canada, a.k.a. Plaut Report, 1985.) found that Canada's refugee determination system was fraught with "irregularities, inconsistencies, and [was] vulnerable to abuse".

=== Appellants ===
The appellants in Singh v Canada were seven foreign nationals – six Indian Sikhs and one Guyanese national of Indian descent (Note: The appellants were Satnam Singh, who had his own counsel, and Harbhajan Singh, Sadhu Singh Thandi, Paramjit Singh Mann, Kewal Singh, Charanjit Singh Gill, and Indrani, who were represented by an appointed Queen's Counsel. Satnam Singh had been active in the Khalistan separatist movement. Details of the appellants refugee claims were unimportant to their Supreme Court appeal and are not widely discussed.) – who had each attempted to claim convention refugee status under the Immigration Act, 1976 upon arrival in Canada between 1977 and 1980. Their claims were made on the basis that they had a "well-founded fear of persecution" in their home countries, and were denied on behalf of the Minister of Employment and Immigration on the advice of the Refugee Status Advisory Committee (RSAC).

In 1982, following an unsuccessful appeal to the Immigration Appeals Board (IAB), the refugee claimants appealed their deportation orders to the Federal Court of Appeal. They asserted that the procedures of the IAB, in which appeals were made in writing with no opportunity to make their case in person, violated their constitutional rights under section 7 of the Canadian Charter of Rights and Freedoms, which had been adopted that same year. The court rejected their request for judicial review, on the basis that any threat to "life, liberty or security of the person" was outside of Canada and that section 7 only applied to "...a deprivation of rights by Canadian authorities applying Canadian laws". The claimants then applied to the Supreme Court for leave to appeal. The Court granted leave on 16 February 1984.

== Hearing ==
Everyone has the right to life, liberty and security of the person and the right not to be deprived thereof except in accordance with the principles of fundamental justice.

— Section 7 of the Canadian Charter of Rights and Freedoms

A panel of seven judges of the Court heard the appeals as a single case on 30 April and 1 May 1984. Several of the appellants were represented by Ian Scott, QC, one of the leading barristers in Ontario.

The major questions to the SCC were:

- whether refugee claimants are entitled to the protection of section 7 of the Canadian Charter of Rights and Freedoms
- whether the procedures for determination of refugee status complied with the principles of fundamental justice.

On 7 December 1984, the Court invited counsel to make written submissions on the application of the Canadian Bill of Rights to the case.

== Decision of the Court ==
On 4 April 1985, the Court gave its decision, unanimously allowing the appeals. One of the justices who had heard the case, Roland Ritchie, (who had retired while the case was on reserve) took no part in the decision. The remaining six justices split evenly in their reasons to allow the appeals. Three justices allowed the appeals under the Charter, while three allowed the appeals under the Bill of Rights:

- Bertha Wilson – with Chief Justice Brian Dickson and Antonio Lamer – held that section 7 of the Charter applied to "every human being who is physically present in Canada". (Note: This broad definition of everyone was taken as it contrasts with other sections of the Charter that use more specific language (e.g.: "Every citizen of Canada" in s. 3 and "Citizens of Canada" in s. 23).) She held that the refugee determination system under the Immigration Act did not "accord refugee claimants fundamental justice in the adjudication of those claims" and was "inconsistent with the principles of fundamental justice" under section 7.
- Jean Beetz – with Willard Estey and William McIntyre – based their ruling on section 2(e) of the Bill of Rights and section 26 of the Charter. The latter confirms rights not within the Charter, while the former states that no law shall "deprive a person of the right to a fair hearing in accordance with the principles of fundamental justice".

The court's ruling guaranteed every applicant for refugee status at least one oral hearing, matching the importance of the refugee issue.

== Commentary ==
Law professor Julius Grey wrote an article commenting on the Singh decision. He stated that the reasons are complementary and each stands as legal authority. (Note: A later article in the Saskatchewan Law Review by J. T. Irvine on the general topic of evenly divided decisions takes the position that when the Supreme Court divides evenly, neither set of reasons is a binding precedent.) Grey described Beetz's reason as more "liberal" (adding that that result was "clearly not intended") since paragraph 2(e) of the Bill of Rights applies to all determinations of rights and obligations, making unnecessary the debates about single or several rights under section 7 of the Charter. He noted Wilson's reasons for her broad interpretation of "security of the person" (which would be violated if a refugee was returned to a country where they might be persecuted) and for its stance that administrative convenience cannot come before the principles of natural justice and procedural fairness.

== Effects ==
The Supreme Court ruling became known as the Singh decision. It led to Canada's refugee determination system becoming one of the most liberal in the world, but it also became one of the most expensive.

The ruling left the Department of Immigration with what Grey described as "an unbearable backlog and administrative chaos". It was estimated to cost $3,500 to process each refugee claim and the government determined that it was unable to provide full hearings to the 63,000 refugee claimants who had become legally entitled to such. Accordingly, amnesty was provided to all claimants who had arrived in Canada prior to 21 May 1986, if they did not have a criminal record, were not a security risk, and had passed their medical examinations. Those who were employed or likely to be so were allowed to become permanent residents.

The Plaut Report, which was submitted to the Minister of Employment and Immigration 13 days after the ruling, made recommendations for an equitable refugee determination system including: oral hearings, independent and regional decision-making bodies, and a full appeal process. These recommendations, along with the realities of the Singh decision, led to the creation of the independent Immigration and Refugee Board of Canada (IRB) in 1989 with hundreds of new officers hired. Nonetheless, the time to process claims extended from months to years.

The decision remains controversial. Refugee advocates see the majority ruling as a progressive response to the obligation to attend to legitimate refugees who require protection. Critics believe the decision has made Canada vulnerable to fraudulent refugee claimants, who overwhelm the system with some becoming improperly admitted and disadvantaging legitimate refugees.

In addition to its effects in immigration, the Singh decision reinforced the associations between constitutional law and administrative law. The decision's application of the Charter and the Bill of Rights reinforced that fundamental justice is an inherent principle in Canadian law and could not be set aside for administrative convenience. It put forward a "common sense approach" of considering the merits and consequences rather than holding to procedural distinctions, and held that judicial review is a fundamental right for matters having serious consequences.

The anniversary of the ruling, 4 April, has been observed as Refugee Rights Day by the Canadian Council for Refugees and immigration-support groups.

== See also ==
- List of Supreme Court of Canada cases
