= Law Society of Upper Canada v Skapinker =

- Supreme Court of Canada

Hearing: February 23, 24, 1984 Judgment: May 3, 1984
- Full case name: The Law Society of Upper Canada v Joel Skapinker
- Citations: [1984] 1 S.C.R. 357
- Docket No.: 17537
- Ruling: Law Society appeal allowed.

Court membership
- Chief Justice: Brian Dickson; Puisne Justices: Roland Ritchie, Jean Beetz, Willard Estey, William McIntyre, Julien Chouinard, Antonio Lamer, Bertha Wilson, Gerald Le Dain

Reasons given
- Unanimous reasons by: Estey J.

Law Society of Upper Canada v Skapinker, [1984] 1 S.C.R. 357 is a leading Supreme Court of Canada decision on mobility rights protected under section 6 of the Canadian Charter of Rights and Freedoms. It is also the first Charter decision to reach the Supreme Court since its enactment in 1982.

== Background ==
Joel Skapinker was a citizen of South Africa residing in Canada who applied to the Ontario bar to practice law. The bar refused his application as the Law Society Act required that he be a Canadian citizen. Skapinker has brought an application to have the provision of the Act requiring Canadian citizenship be held inoperative on the basis that it violated section 6(2)(b) of the Charter.

At trial, the application was denied. However, on appeal the Court held that his mobility rights were in fact violated.

== Opinion of the Court ==
The unanimous Court held that Skapinker's rights were not violated by the Law Society Act. Estey J., writing for the Court, acknowledged the difficulty in interpreting the Charter as it was not to be treated like a statute. He examined the headings of each section and tried to reconcile them with the wording of the sections. He noted several factors that must be considered:

- the degree of difficulty because of ambiguity or obscurity in construing the section;
- the length and complexity of the provision;
- the apparent homogeneity of the provision appearing under the heading; the use of generic terminology in the heading;
- the presence or absence of a system of headings which appear to segregate the component elements of the Charter;
- and the relationship of the terminology employed in the heading to the substance of the headlined provision.

In the end Estey finds that section 6 "does not establish a separate and distinct right to work divorced from the mobility provisions in which it is found. The two rights (in para. (a) and in para. (b)) both relate to movement into another province, either for the taking up of residence, or to work without establishing residence." Consequently, the appeal was overturned. Estey, however, added that his interpretation has been intentionally cautious due to the newness of the Charter and that there may warrant further expansion of the right in the future.

== See also ==
- List of Supreme Court of Canada cases (Dickson Court)
- Andrews v. Law Society of British Columbia − a case in which a similar citizenship requirement was struck down as a violation of the appellant's Section 15 Charter rights.
