= Section 26 of the Canadian Charter of Rights and Freedoms =

Non-derogation of other rights

Section 26 of the Canadian Charter of Rights and Freedoms, like other provisions within the section 25 to 31 bloc, provides a guide in interpreting how the Charter should affect Canadian society. The section's particular role is to address rights not covered by or mentioned in the Charter.

The section reads:

26. The guarantee in this Charter of certain rights and freedoms shall not be construed as denying the existence of any other rights or freedoms that exist in Canada.

== Purpose ==
As constitutional scholar Peter Hogg notes, this section is analogous to the Ninth Amendment to the United States Constitution, which reads,

The enumeration in the Constitution, of certain rights, shall not be construed to deny or disparage others retained by the people.

In other words, section 26 confirms that rights not within the Charter are nevertheless as real as they would be had the Charter never been enacted. According to Hogg, the purpose of this "cautionary provision" was to confirm pre-Charter rights will persist. Some rights that predate the Charter but cannot be found within it are anchored in the Canadian Bill of Rights and its provincial counterparts, as well as in the common law. The rights to "enjoyment of property" and to have one's rights and obligations determined through a fair hearing and through fundamental justice, are found in the Canadian Bill of Rights but are not duplicated in the Charter, and thus fall under the category of rights referred to in section 26. A notable case in which section 26 and the Bill of Rights were discussed is Singh v. Minister of Employment and Immigration (1985).

On one of its websites, the government of Canada claims there was also a more forward-looking purpose for section 26, namely to allow non-Charter rights to continue being created. Rights not included in the Charter but established in the future by Parliament, a provincial legislature, or in international law, will be valid.

What rights are not afforded any recognition by section 26 has also been discussed. In 1986, author Dale Gibson argued that the rights referred to in section 26 are positive rights belonging to private individuals, as opposed to politicians and bureaucrats acting on behalf of the government. The reason for this was that politicians and bureaucrats acting on behalf of the government could claim that their "freedom to discriminate" could be a freedom protected by section 26. This would, in turn, lead to limits on the Charter rights of private individuals being discriminated against, which would render these Charter rights "meaningless."

Still, section 26 is not a means to ensure that all rights forgotten or neglected by the drafters of the Charter are automatically endowed with the same status as rights specifically named in the Charter. This was heavily indicated in 1985, by both a Federal Court and a Prince Edward Island court. In the case Le Groupe des Eleveurs de Volailles et al. v. Canadian Chicken Marketing Agency, the Federal Court ruled that non-Charter rights are not enhanced by section 26; in R. v. MacAusland, the Prince Edward Island court ruled that non-Charter rights are not constitutionally guaranteed, although they are not limited by the Charter either. Hence, while the Charter in and of itself does not repeal rights, legislatures still can. Thus s. 26 is a much weaker defence of rights than the superficially similar protection of unenumerated rights in the American Bill of Rights.

== History ==
The content of section 26 first appeared in the October 1980 draft of the Charter (the earliest version), but also stated the Charter should not be construed as denying the existence of "any rights or freedoms that pertain to the native peoples of Canada." After dramatic protests by Native Canadians, who felt this clause did not sufficiently protect aboriginal rights, it was abandoned and section 35 of the Constitution Act, 1982, as well as a stronger section regarding the Charter and aboriginal rights, section 25, were added to the Constitution of Canada instead.
