= R v Morrisey =

- Supreme Court of Canada

Hearing: December 9, 1999 Judgment: September 29, 2000
- Full case name: Marty Lorraine Morrisey v Her Majesty The Queen
- Citations: 2000 SCC 39, [2000] 2 SCR 90
- Ruling: Morrisey appeal dismissed

Court membership
- Chief Justice: Antonio Lamer; Puisne Justices: Claire L'Heureux-Dubé, Charles Gonthier, Beverley McLachlin, Frank Iacobucci, John C. Major, Michel Bastarache, Ian Binnie, Louise Arbour

Reasons given
- Majority: Gonthier J, joined by Iacobucci, Major, Bastarache and Binnie JJ
- Concurrence: Arbour J, joined by McLachlin J

Laws applied
- R v Smith, [1987] 1 SCR 1045; R v Goltz, [1991] 3 SCR 485; R v Wust, [2000] 1 SCR 455, 2000 SCC 18

R v Morrisey, [2000] 2 S.C.R. 90, 2000 SCC 39 is a leading Supreme Court of Canada decision on the right to be free of cruel and unusual punishment under section 12 of the Canadian Charter of Rights and Freedoms. The Court held that there can be exemptions for mandatory prison sentences where the sentence is unreasonable or has an effect upon the accused that may be considered harsh.

== Background ==
Marty Morrisey, a 36-year-old from Belmont, Nova Scotia, was drinking with two friends in a cabin. Morrisey and his friend Adrian Teed sawed the barrel off of a shotgun. Morrisey told Teed the gun was for the purpose of committing a robbery when in fact he was intending to kill himself due to recent relationship problems. Morrisey drove the third friend home, and when he returned to the cabin, Teed was sleeping in a bunk bed. Morrisey leaped onto the bunk bed while holding the loaded shotgun. He subsequently fell off the bed, likely due to his intoxication, and the gun accidentally discharged, fatally wounding Teed.

Morrisey was charged with criminal negligence causing death under section 220(a) of the Criminal Code.

At trial, the judge found that the mandatory four-year sentence required under section 220(a) violated section 12 of the Charter. Instead, Morrisey was sentenced to two years including the time he spent in pre-trial custody. The Court of Appeal overturned the ruling.

The question before the Court was whether section 12 was violated and if so, was it justified under section 1.

The Supreme Court upheld the ruling of the Court of Appeal and found there to be no violation, but the Court allowed the time in pre-trial custody to be included in the sentence.

== Opinion of the Court ==
Gonthier J wrote the opinion for the majority. He first considered all the previous decisions on section 12 and rearticulated the analysis. He stated that when a sentence is merely disproportionate to the offence, it is not enough to invoke section 12. The true purpose of section 12 is to protect "against punishment which is so excessive as to outrage our society's sense of decency", which he admitted is a high standard as the court should not be "quick to invalidate sentences crafted by legislators".

Gonthier gave two situations where section 12 can be invoked for cruel and unusual sentences. First, there are situations where the sentence itself is reasonable but for a particular person may have an effect on the accused that would be overly harsh. Second, if the sentence is reasonable for the particular person then the court must consider whether it would be harsh in a reasonable hypothetical situation.

== See also ==
- List of Supreme Court of Canada cases (McLachlin Court)
