= Canada (Minister of Employment and Immigration) v Chiarelli =

- Supreme Court of Canada

Hearing: October 28, 1991 Judgment: March 26, 1992
- Full case name: The Minister of Employment and Immigration v. Joseph (Giuseppe) Chiarelli
- Citations: [1992] 1 S.C.R. 711
- Docket No.: 21920
- Prior history: Partial judgment against the Minister of Employment and Immigration in the Federal Court of Appeal.
- Ruling: Appeal allowed and cross‑appeal dismissed.

Holding
- 1. The most fundamental principle of immigration law is that non‑citizens do not have an unqualified right to enter or remain in the country.; 2. Parliament's requirement that a permanent resident only be allowed to remain in the country if they have not been convicted of a serious offence (one for which a term of imprisonment of five years or more may be imposed) is not arbitrary, and the mandatory requirement to deport permanent residents who do commit a serious offence without further consideration does not infringe principles of fundamental justice.

Court membership
- Chief Justice: Antonio Lamer; Puisne Justices: Gérard La Forest, Claire L'Heureux-Dubé, John Sopinka, Charles Gonthier, Peter Cory, Beverley McLachlin, William Stevenson, Frank Iacobucci

Reasons given
- Unanimous reasons by: Sopinka J.

Canada (Minister of Employment and Immigration) v Chiarelli, [1992] 1 S.C.R. 711 is a leading Canadian case on the constitutionality of the deportation regime. The court held that the deportation a permanent resident who has violated a condition of admission to Canada does not violate any principle of fundamental justice under section 7 of the Canadian Charter of Rights and Freedoms.

== Background ==
Joseph (Giuseppe) Chiarelli was born in Italy in 1960 and arrived in Canada in 1975. In November 1984 he pleaded guilty to unlawfully uttering threats to cause injury and to possession of narcotics for purpose of trafficking. He served six months in prison.

In 1986 he was called to a hearing based on his violation of his permanent residency status for his previous convictions.

== Opinion of the Court ==
Justice Sopinka argued that the granting of permanent resident status was contractual in nature between the applicant and the state. "The most fundamental principle of immigration law is that non-citizens do not have an unqualified right to enter or remain in the country". Consequently, the state has the right to grant the privilege of enter, work, and access services of the country, and may grant them in exchange for conditions.

== Aftermath ==
Reasoning has been criticized as children are equally bound despite them not consenting to the conditions. The argument for right to exclude was also criticized for its lack of consideration of international obligations such as duty against refoulement.

== See also ==
- List of Supreme Court of Canada cases
