= R v Goltz =

- Supreme Court of Canada

Hearing: June 7, 1991 Judgment: November 14, 1991
- Full case name: Her Majesty The Queen v Willy Goltz
- Citations: [1991] 3 S.C.R. 485
- Docket No.: 21826
- Ruling: Appeal allowed

Court membership
- Chief Justice: Antonio Lamer; Puisne Justices: Gérard La Forest, Claire L'Heureux-Dubé, John Sopinka, Charles Gonthier, Peter Cory, Beverley McLachlin, William Stevenson, Frank Iacobucci

Reasons given
- Majority: Gonthier J., joined by La Forest, L'Heureux-Dubé, Sopinka, Cory and Iacobucci JJ.
- Dissent: McLachlin J., joined by Lamer C.J. and Stevenson J.

R v Goltz, [1991] 3 S.C.R. 485 is a leading constitutional decision of the Supreme Court of Canada on the right against cruel and unusual punishment under section 12 of the Canadian Charter of Rights and Freedoms. The Court considered a test for cruel and unusual punishment and found that based on the test the BC Motor Vehicle Act which requires a minimum sentence of 7 days in prison and a fine for a first conviction for driving without a licence does not violate section 12 of the Charter.

== Background ==
In June 1987, Willy Goltz was charged and convicted under s. 88(1) of the B.C. Motor Vehicle Act. He had been driving with a suspended licence.

At the BC provincial court, Goltz was convicted. It was argued that the provision violated the right against cruel and unusual punishment, but was rejected.

== Judgment of the Supreme Court of Canada ==
Justice Gonthier, writing for the majority, granted the appeal and concluded that the provision was not in violation of section 12 of the Charter.

== See also ==
- List of Supreme Court of Canada cases
