= Section 31 of the Canadian Charter of Rights and Freedoms =

Charter does not extend legislative powers

Section 31 of the Canadian Charter of Rights and Freedoms is a part of the Constitution of Canada, which clarifies that the Charter does not increase the powers of either the federal government or the legislatures of the provinces of Canada. As a result, only the courts may enforce the rights in the Charter.

== Text ==
The section reads,

31. Nothing in this Charter extends the legislative powers of any body or authority.

== Enforcement of the Charter ==
As the government of Canada notes, this shows the Charter does not disturb the balance of the distribution of legislative powers under the Constitution Act, 1867. Constitutional scholar Peter Hogg has called section 31 a "cautionary provision." He specifically notes that section 31 denies the federal Parliament of Canada any additional powers. Indeed, section 31 is a departure from the educational rights in the Constitution Act, 1867. Section 93(4) of that Act gives the federal Parliament the power to intervene if a provincial government fails to respect certain rights. The federal government could then pass and enforce laws that would uphold the rights.

The adoption of section 31 was probably meant to avoid an unfavourable reaction against the Charter from the provinces. The provinces had opposed the Charter because of the potential limits on their powers, but the opposition would have been stronger had Parliament been able to exert its authority over the provinces.

As Hogg notes, section 31 also distinguishes the Charter from various rights in the amendments to the United States Constitution. In the United States, the federal Congress has the authority to enforce various rights, including those in the Thirteenth Amendment, which prohibits slavery, the Fourteenth Amendment, which binds the states to respect due process, and the Fifteenth Amendment, which contains a partial right to vote.

While section 31 denies remedial powers in respect of the Charter for Parliament and the legislatures, the courts receive this authority through section 24 and section 52 of the Constitution Act, 1982.

== Federalism ==
Section 31 is related to the theory of federalism in that if federalism means both the central and regional authorities are sovereign, the central authority should not be able to intervene to change a regional act. The Constitution Act, 1867 allows for this in regard to educational rights because in 1867 Canada was not designed to be a truly federal country. However, Parliament has never exercised its educational powers and it is now generally expected the federal government would not act that way.

== Judicial interpretation ==
In 1984, the Alberta Court of Appeal, in making its ruling on R. v. Big M Drug Mart Ltd., made reference to section 31. A lower court had found federal legislation compelling the observance of the Christian Sabbath to be not only a breach of section 2 of the Charter (freedom of religion), but also outside Parliament's criminal law authority under the division of powers, despite earlier findings that morality could guide the definition of criminal law. As the lower court argued, the circumstances and values of the day no longer supported the view that Christianity can guide what constitutes valid criminal law. The Court of Appeal, however, overturned the finding on the division of powers. The Court of Appeal argued that the finding that new circumstances and values limited the scope of criminal law constituted "a redistribution of legislative powers in Canada" that section 31 guards against. The Court of Appeal added that it was also the intention that the Charter would not affect the division of powers, and went on to speculate that otherwise the Charter would create an "odd" situation in which a legislative body could unilaterally change the distribution of powers by reclaiming the powers it had lost under the Charter, by invoking the notwithstanding clause.

In 2001, the Federal Court decided against claims that section 30 of the Charter should mean territories should be treated generally like provinces. The Court pointed to section 31, saying section 30 cannot increase the powers of the territorial legislature to the extent that a territory can achieve equality with the provinces.

== See also ==
- Congressional power of enforcement
