= Jose Figueroa deportation case =

The Jose Figueroa deportation case began on 5 May 2010, when the Immigration Division of the Immigration and Refugee Board of Canada (IRB) issued a deportation order against Jose Luis Figueroa, who had entered Canada in 1997 as a refugee from El Salvador.

IRB alleged that Figueroa was inadmissible into Canada pursuant of section 34(1) of the Immigration and Refugee Protection Act (IRPA). More specifically, the allegation that had been brought up by a Canada Border Services Agency (CBSA) officer was that Figueroa was inadmissible into Canada for being a member of the Farabundo Marti National Liberation Front (FMLN), an organization that, according to the opinion of the officer, was considered to be a terrorist organization.

== Public response ==
The issue of inadmissibility rapidly caught the attention of many, given the fact that the FMLN, the organization that is being referred to as a "terrorist organization," not only was the governing party of El Salvador at the time that the inadmissibility issue was brought up, but also it is not, and has never been, proscribed in the list of entities established by the Canadian Government; nor has it ever been included in the list of entities administered by the Counter Terrorism Committee (CTC) created by the United Nations.

A social media campaign was thought of and organized by students of the University of British Columbia (UBC) in response to a call to overturn the deportation order against Figueroa. The "We are Jose" campaign came to public light on 16 January 2011, on the anniversary of the signing of the peace agreement of Chapultepec, Mexico, that put an end to the 12-year Salvadoran Civil War.

== Further development ==
Since the start of the We are Jose campaign, there have been several milestones that provided momentum in the effort to achieving the objective to overturn the deportation order. There have also been several decisions made by Canadian government officials, including one by a delegate from the Minister of Immigration, on 27 March 2013, to enforce the refusal of a humanitarian grounds application that had been filed on 25 June 2002 and approved in principle on 12 July 2004. The minister's delegate also decided to allow the wife of Figueroa to remain in Canada so that she could care for the couple's three Canadian born children. The minister's delegate argued that Figueroa would still be able to provide moral support to his family via the modern way of communication, presumably via Skype.

On 4 October 2013, Figueroa was forced to claim sanctuary at Walnut Grove Lutheran Church in the city of Langley, BC, where he remained for over two years until he was granted a ministerial exemption by Minister of Immigration John McCallum. Figueroa left sanctuary on 23 December 2015. Since the Minister granted the exemption, the application for permanent residence has yet to be finalized.

In November 2016, Figueroa planned to appear before the Federal Court and argue to have his name cleared. He said that, although he is now a permanent resident in Canada, the CBSA still has a deportation order against him and an 8-year-old report alleging links to terrorism.

== Precedent ==
Figueroa's case has set some important legal precedents that relates to the legal definition of different terms, including the legal definitions of "membership," "organization," and "terrorism," as well as how these legal terms are used to advance on findings of inadmissibility under section 34(1) of the Immigration and Refugee Protection Act (IRPA) against immigrants and refugees who, at any point in life were part of or sympathizers of movements that fought in struggles for liberation.

The finding of inadmissibility by the Immigration and Refugee Board against Figueroa on 5 May 2010, when compared with the fact that if the allegation had been brought against a prominent figure such a Nelson Mandela, highlights an evident paradox in the law. Mandela would have been found inadmissible into Canada due to his membership with the African National Congress (ANC), however, Nelson Mandela was an honorary citizen of Canada.
