= Re Burley =

Canadian legal case about extradition

Re Burley (1865)
- Court: Court of Common Pleas of Upper Canada
- Citation: 1 U.C.L.J. 34

Re Burley (1865), 1 U.C.L.J. 34, was a decision on extradition by the Court of Common Pleas of Upper Canada. Though made two years before Confederation, the case has been cited by the Supreme Court of Canada in mobility rights and extradition cases over a century later.

== Decision ==
The decision was made by Sir William Buell Richards, who would later go on to become the first Chief Justice of Canada after the Supreme Court of Canada was established in 1875. Richards was faced with a case in which a British subject who was going to be extradited to the United States claimed that by virtue of his nationality, he had a right to stay in Canada. Richards upheld the extradition as a matter of treaty law and noted Canadian statutes that seemed to recognize such extradition as legal:

Whatever may be considered to have been the general rule in relation to a government surrendering its own subjects to a foreign government, I cannot say I have any doubt, that under the treaty and our own statute, a British subject who is in other respects brought within the law, cannot legally demand that he ought not to be surrendered merely because he is a natural born subject of Her Majesty.

== Precedent ==
Even after Confederation, the creation of Canadian citizenship and the adoption of the Canadian Charter of Rights and Freedoms, which recognized freedom of movement in section 6, the case was cited by the Supreme Court. In Canada v. Schmidt (1987), the case was cited to state that Canada should trust the nations to which it extradites people carry out trials. In United States of America v. Cotroni (1989), the Court upheld an extradition as a justified limit on section 6 and noted that the limit was partially reinforced by the fact that extradition had been allowed for "well over one hundred years" and thus "extradition has been part of the fabric of our law.

Re Burley was cited to make the point that since criminals can easily escape from the US to Canada, it had been "imperative that little leniency be accorded citizens in this regard."

Later, in the Supreme Court case United States v. Burns (2001), the Court was faced with the claim that Canadian citizens faced with extradition to the US had a right to stay and be tried in Canada. The Court cited Re Burley to state, "Traditionally, nationality has afforded no defence to extradition from Canada."
