= R v Smith (1987) =

- Supreme Court of Canada

Hearing: December 10, 1985 Judgment: June 25, 1987
- Full case name: Edward Dewey Smith v Her Majesty The Queen
- Citations: [1987] 1 S.C.R. 1045
- Prior history: Court of Appeal ruled in favour of the Crown
- Ruling: Appeal allowed

Court membership
- Chief Justice: Brian Dickson; Puisne Justices: Jean Beetz, Willard Estey, William McIntyre, Julien Chouinard, Antonio Lamer, Bertha Wilson, Gerald Le Dain, Gérard La Forest

Reasons given
- Plurality: Lamer (Dickson concurring)
- Concurrence: Wilson
- Concurrence: LeDain
- Concurrence: La Forest
- Dissent: McIntyre
- Beetz and Estey took no part in the consideration or decision of the case.
- Chouinard did not participate in the final disposition of the judgment.

Laws applied
- Canadian Charter of Rights and Freedoms, s. 12; Narcotics Control Act, s. 5(2)

R v Smith, [1987] 1 S.C.R. 1045 is a Supreme Court of Canada decision. The Court struck down a mandatory seven-year sentence requirement for the importation of drugs as a violation of the right against cruel and unusual punishment contrary to section 12 of the Canadian Charter of Rights and Freedoms.

== Background ==
Edward Smith, a twenty-seven-year-old man with multiple convictions for drug-related offences, was arriving back in Canada from Bolivia. At customs he was searched and the officers found seven and a half ounces of cocaine that was 85 to 90 per cent pure. He was convicted of importing drugs under the Narcotics Control Act and sentenced to eight years. The Act had required a minimum sentence of seven years regardless of the amount found. The provision was challenged on the basis that it violated the Charter.

The issue before the Supreme Court of Canada was whether the mandatory minimum sentence of seven years under section 5(2) of the Narcotics Control Act infringe section 7, 9, and 12 of the Charter.

== Decision of the Supreme Court ==
The Supreme Court ruled 5-1 (Note: The appeal was heard by a panel of seven judges, but Justice Chouinard died before the court gave its decision. He did not participate in the reasons.) in favour of allowing the accused's appeal, but there was no clear majority on the reasons for doing so.

=== Plurality reasons of Lamer ===
Justice Lamer, writing for himself and Chief Justice Dickson, held that the sentencing provision violated section 12 of the Charter. He noted that when it came to mandatory sentencing it is very important that deference be given except where it is grossly disproportionate. To assess the provision the court should consider both the gravity of the offence, the particular facts of the case, as well as the offender's personal characteristics. The characteristics are particularly important. Lamer speculated that even a young person caught bringing a single joint across the border will be subject to the sentencing provision. This, said Lamer, would subject the first time offender to cruel and unusual punishment.

On applying the section 1 test to the violation, it was found that the provision was rationally connected to the pressing objective of deterring drugs importation, but it failed to be proportional. Thus, it was struck down.

=== Dissent ===
Justice McIntyre, in dissent, objected on a number of grounds. He did not like Lamer's speculation about the first time offender. Smith was a multiple offender and had imported enough narcotics that it was not cruel and unusual to sentence him for over seven years. The standard for cruel and unusual punishment should be based on public outrage and the degradation of the offender's dignity, none of which was found.

== See also ==
- List of Supreme Court of Canada cases (Dickson Court)
