= Shocks the conscience =

Legal standard in the United States and Canada

Shocks the conscience is a phrase used as a legal standard in the United States and Canada. An action is understood to "shock the conscience" if it is "grossly unjust to the observer."

== United States ==
In US law, the phrase typically describes whether or not the due process requirement of the Fourteenth Amendment to the United States Constitution has been met. The term originally entered into case law with Rochin v. California (1953). This balancing test is often cited as having subsequently been used in a particularly subjective manner.

The term is also used in some jurisdictions as a means to determine whether a jury award is out of line with the underlying civil wrong; a jury award can be overturned on appeal if, by its amount relative to the underlying civil wrong, it "shocks the conscience".

"Shock the conscience" has also been used as a constitutional standard in discussing the issue of whether or not detainees can be tortured.

== Canada ==
In Canada the phrase was adopted in the case Canada v Schmidt (1987) to determine whether extradition would be a breach of fundamental justice under the Canadian Charter of Rights and Freedoms. A court may look at the justice system of another country, and disregarding "finicky" requirements of fundamental justice in Canada, may consider some potential punishments in other countries so outrageous that a person should not be put at risk by the extraditing government. The measure was used in United States v Burns (2001) to find that the possibility of execution would shock the conscience. Critics such as Professor Peter Hogg have suggested that the use of this measure indicates courts have "enormous discretion," and he argues this is demonstrated by inconsistencies between what is considered shocking and what is considered cruel and unusual punishment.
