= Leonard Lake =

American serial killer (1945–1985)

- Born: Leonard Thomas Lake; October 29, 1945; San Francisco, California, U.S.
- Died: June 6, 1985 (aged 39); South San Francisco, California, U.S.
- Cause of death: Suicide by cyanide poisoning
- Other names: Leonard Hill; Leonard Blake; Alan Drey; Tom Meyers; Jim Bright; Ted White; Charles Gunnar; Donald Lake; Randy Jacobsen; Robin Stapley; Paul Cosner; The Sex Slave Killer
- Spouse(s): Karen Lee; Claralyn Balazs
- Convictions: Vehicle theft (1982); Illegal possession of a firearm (1985); Identity theft (1985)

Details
- Victims: 11 confirmed 25 suspected
- Span of crimes: 1983–1985
- Country: United States
- State: California
- Date apprehended: June 2, 1985
- Imprisoned at: Federal Correctional Institution, Leavenworth (released after paying bail in 1982)

Leonard Thomas Lake (October 29, 1945 – June 6, 1985), also known as Leonard Blake, Leonard Hill and a variety of other aliases, was an American survivalist and serial killer. He raped, tortured, and murdered at least eleven and perhaps up to twenty-five victims with his accomplice Charles Ng. They held victims at a remote cabin near Wilseyville, California, 150 miles (240 km) east of San Francisco, between 1983 and 1985. Lake was never convicted of murder, as he took cyanide pills soon after his arrest on shoplifting charges and died four days later. Lake was not identified as a murder suspect until investigation after his death.

Lake and Ng are sometimes referred to as the Sex Slave Killers because of the prolonged torture they imposed on their female victims which they often videotaped. Those tapes, along with human remains and journals, were used to convict Ng on eleven counts of capital murder in 1999.

== Early life ==
Leonard Lake was born in San Francisco, California, the first of three children to Elgin Leonard Lake and Gloria May Williams. Lake's parents divorced when he was six years old, and his mother's second marriage produced two half-sisters. The siblings moved in with their maternal grandmother after the divorce.

Lake was reportedly a bright child, but developed an obsession with pornography after habitually photographing his sisters nude, which his grandmother apparently encouraged. Lake allegedly killed mice by dissolving them in chemicals, in the same manner he would later dispose of his human victims' corpses, and became fascinated with the idea of holding women captive after reading the John Fowles novel The Collector (1963) in his teens.

After attending Balboa High School, Lake enlisted in the United States Marine Corps in 1964. He served two tours of duty during the Vietnam War as a radar electronics technician. During this period, Lake was first diagnosed with schizoid personality disorder. After what was termed a "delusional breakdown" in Da Nang, Lake received psychotherapy and, in 1971, a medical discharge.

Lake settled in San Jose and enrolled at San Jose State University, but dropped out after one semester upon becoming enamored of San Francisco's hippie community. He moved to a commune in San Francisco and married briefly in 1969. The marriage dissolved, however, after his wife discovered that he was making and appearing in amateur pornographic movies, usually involving bondage or sadomasochism.

For the next eight years, Lake lived at the Greenfield Ranch, a 5,600-acre (2,300 ha) back-to-the-land settlement near Calpella, north of Ukiah. In 1975, he met and eventually married Claralyn Balazs — nicknamed "Cricket" — who accepted Lake's fantasies and appeared in many of his pornographic films. Lake's growing fear of impending nuclear holocaust prompted him to begin construction of a "bunker" on the settlement grounds until the owner of the property became aware of the project and ordered it halted.

== Murders ==
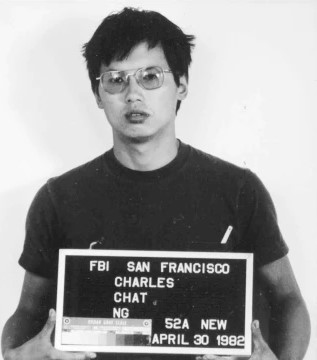
FBI mugshot of Ng, 1982

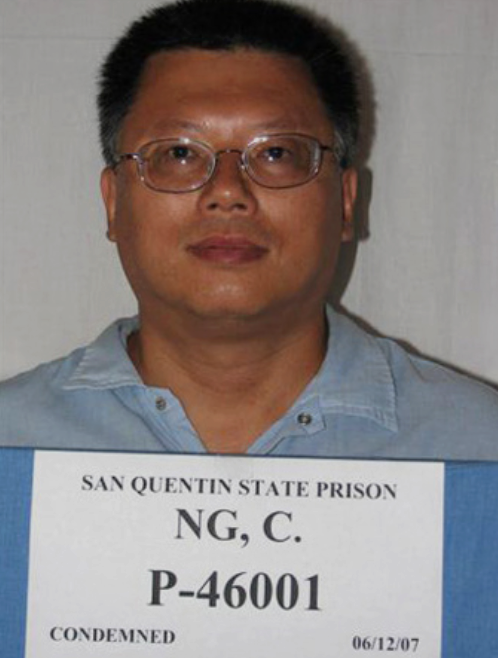
Prison mugshot of Ng, 2007

Lake met Charles Ng, a fellow former Marine originally from Hong Kong, in 1980 or 1981. Sources claim the two met through an advertisement Lake, by that time managing a Philo motel, had placed in a survivalist magazine. Ng had escaped from a military prison following a conviction for weapons theft and stayed at Lake's motel, eventually moving into a house along with Lake and Balazs. Several witnesses testified that Lake was a domineering figure in their relationship; Ng stated that he looked up to Lake "like a brotherly, fatherly figure".

In April 1982, police arrested Lake and Ng on weapons charges. Ng was returned to Fort Leavenworth to complete his sentence. Lake jumped bail and began life as a fugitive, using various aliases and disguises in an attempt to hide his identity. In July 1984, Ng rejoined Lake and his wife after he had completed his sentence and had been dishonorably discharged. He first stayed in an apartment rented by one of Lake's sisters before moving into an apartment on Lenox Way in San Francisco that autumn. Meanwhile, Lake moved into a remote cabin near Wilseyville owned by his in-laws. Next to the cabin he had built a structure described in his journals as a "dungeon".

Over the next year, Lake and Ng began a pattern of kidnapping and murdering men, women and children. These crimes became known as the Miranda Murders, named after a character in The Collector, the book that inspired Lake. According to court records, Lake and Ng killed the men and infants immediately, but subjected women to a period of enslavement, rape and torture before killing them. Lake is known to have committed several murders without the assistance of Ng, and wrote in his journal that Ng was initially "very hesitant to get involved with my plan".

=== Victims ===
- Donald Steven Lake, 31, was Leonard's younger brother. He had been hit by a train as a child and was mentally disabled from the accident. Leonard resented him because his disability required the full attention of their mother, resulting in Leonard being raised by their grandparents. Leonard referred to Donald as a "leech" in conversations with his ex-wife Balazs, and also believed Donald did not deserve to live. In December 1982, Donald was living with his mother in San Francisco, California when Leonard stopped by and asked Donald to come along to a house-sitting job. Donald was never seen again, and his mother reported him missing. Leonard resurfaced on New Year's Day in 1983 to rent a room in a house under the name "Alan Drey". Leonard had stolen Donald's identity and began cashing his disability checks. Leonard also later forged a letter to their mother claiming to be Donald and that he had moved away to live with drug dealers in Reno, Nevada.
- Four months later, Lake moved in with his friend Charles Donald Gunnar, 34. Gunnar was the best man at Lake's wedding to Balazs in 1981. On May 20, 1983, Lake invited Gunnar on a road trip to Las Vegas after his divorce. Several days later, Lake returned alone in Gunnar's van and told acquaintances that Gunnar ran off with a woman. Gunnar was never seen again. After the murder, Lake stole Gunnar's identity and began to cash his government checks. Lake introduced himself as Gunnar to most of the people he met while living in Wilseyville. Gunnar's body was not found by police during the initial 1985 investigation, but was unearthed in 1992 when a subsequent owner of the Wilseyville property was digging down to install a footing for a new garage.
- In 1984, Reginald "Reggie" Frisby, 29, was murdered. He was never reported missing and it is unclear how he met Lake and Ng. His remains were found on June 7, 1985, by police investigating a cabin near Wilseyville during the initial investigation but not identified until January 2025 using investigative genetic genealogy. Frisby had been living in San Francisco and disappeared from public records after January 1984; his body was buried alongside that of Maurice Rock, indicating they were possibly killed around the same time in July or August of that year. In 1993 while he was still unidentified, his remains were chosen to be analyzed by a forensic anthropologist due to the fact that he was the only complete skeleton found on the property whose identity was still unknown, and a sketch was prepared of his likeness.
- On May 1, 1984, Jeffrey Dean Askren, 30, was reported missing after not showing up for work in Santa Clara, California. His late model Honda automobile was found three days later in the West Point area of Calaveras County, six miles from Lake's home. His disappearance occurred within the time range of Lake's killings although his remains have not yet been identified from those that were recovered at the Wilseyville site.
- On July 11, 1984, Donald Albert Giulietti, 36, a disc jockey from San Francisco, California, was shot in the head by an assailant armed with a pistol. Giulietti lived with a man named Richard Carrazza. Carrazza was also shot in the chest but survived and contacted police after the shooter fled. Carrazza, the only known victim of Lake or Ng to have survived, identified Ng as the shooter.
- Harvey R. Dubs, 30, Deborah Ann Dubs, 33, and Sean Christopher Dubs, 1, went missing on July 25, 1984, from their San Francisco home. On the night they disappeared, Deborah was speaking on the telephone to a friend when the doorbell rang at their apartment. Deborah told her friend that she had to end the conversation, as two men had arrived. The Dubs family were never heard from again. A receipt in Harvey's name and video equipment from the Dubses' home were found at Lake's cabin.
- In July or August 1984, Maurice Anthony Rock, 37, disappeared from a San Francisco rooming house. Lake had rented a room at the same establishment under the pseudonym "Alan Drey". Sometime after Rock disappeared, the woman renting the room next to Rock's saw a man remove a refrigerator from his room. The man introduced himself as "Steve" and offered to photograph her. She agreed but felt unsettled and changed her mind once he came to her room with his camera equipment. She later identified the man as Lake. Rock's remains were recovered from the Wilseyville property.
- On October 15, 1984, Randy Vern Jacobson, 35, disappeared from a San Francisco rooming house after becoming involved in a business deal with Lake. Lake subsequently stole his identity and tried to steal his van after the murder, but the van was towed before he was able to move it. Jacobson's remains were buried on the Wilseyville property.
- On November 2, 1984, Paul Steven Cosner, 39, was last seen in San Francisco, California. His brown 1980 Honda Prelude disappeared with him. Cosner had advertised the vehicle for sale in a local newspaper and went missing when he went to show his car to a potential buyer he described as “weird". Lake was arrested with Cosner's car on June 2, 1985. Cosner's remains have never been found.
- On November 16, 1984, Cheryl Lynn Okoro (born Sheryl Lynn Porter), 25, disappeared from the same San Francisco rooming house where Rock had lived. Photographs, personal belongings, and an 11-page letter by Okoro were recovered from the Wilseyville property, but her remains were never found.
- On January 20, 1985, Clifford Raymond Peranteau, 23, went missing from San Francisco. He was a coworker of Ng's at Dennis Moving Company and in April 1985, Lake sold Peranteau's motorcycle to a man in West Point, California. Several of Peranteau's personal belongings were discovered in an apartment Ng owned.
- On February 24, 1985, Jeffrey Dean Gerald, 25, went missing from San Francisco after saying he was going to help Ng move for a side job.
- On April 12, 1985, Michael Sean Carroll, 22, who had served with Ng in Fort Leavenworth, and his girlfriend Kathleen Elizabeth Allen, 18, were spending time in a Milpitas, California motel room. At 10 p.m., Carroll told Allen that he had to leave and never returned. On April 15, Allen received a phone call at her workplace and was told that Carroll was at Lake Tahoe and may have been shot. She immediately told her boss she had to leave and was last seen getting into a car with Lake. Allen appeared in a videotape found at Lake's home and her last paycheck was sent to a town near his cabin. Carroll was also mentioned in the videotape and his driver's license was found at the property.
- On April 19, 1985, Lonnie Wayne Bond Sr., 27, his live-in girlfriend Brenda Sue O'Connor, 20, their son, Lonnie Wayne Bond Jr., 1, and a family friend, Robin Scott Stapley, 26, went missing from Wilseyville. When Lake was arrested on June 2, Lonnie's license plate was affixed to the car he was driving. Lonnie Sr.'s and Stapley's bodies were found buried at Wilseyville in a shallow grave about a mile (1,600 m) from Lake's property. O'Connor's remains were identified as being among those found at the cabin by police in 2025. Lonnie Jr. has never been found.

== Lake's fall and aftermath ==
On June 2, 1985, Ng was caught shoplifting a vise from a hardware store in South San Francisco and fled on foot, throwing the vise into the trunk of a brown Honda. Lake attempted to pay for the vise, but by then police had arrived. Officers noticed that Lake bore no resemblance to the photo on his driver's license, which carried the name of Robin Scott Stapley, a San Diego man reported missing by his family several weeks earlier. Lake was arrested after a gun equipped with a prohibited silencer was found in the trunk of his vehicle, a 1980 Honda Prelude, and was later positively identified via a fingerprint search. At the station, Lake was placed in an interrogation room, where he was given a pen, paper, and a glass of water. A short time later, a detective entered the room to conduct an interview and found Lake violently convulsing on the floor and appearing to be extremely panicked, showing signs of asphyxia. The notepad contained a brief suicide note. At the hospital, it was determined that he swallowed cyanide pills he had sewn into his clothes. Lake never regained consciousness and died on June 6, 1985.

The license plate on Lake's car was registered to Lonnie Bond, but its VIN was registered to Paul Cosner, who had disappeared from San Francisco in November 1984. A utility bill in the car led detectives under the command of San Francisco Police Homicide Lieutenant Gerald McCarthy to the property in Wilseyville, where they found Stapley's and Bond's trucks and the dungeon. In a makeshift burial site nearby, police unearthed over 40 pounds (18 kg) of burned and crushed human bone fragments from at least 11 bodies.

They also found a hand-drawn "treasure map", leading them to two buried five-gallon buckets. One contained an envelope with names and identifications, suggesting that the total number of victims might have been as high as 25. The other contained Lake's handwritten journals for 1983 and 1984 and two videotapes documenting the torture of two of their victims. On one of the tapes, labeled "M-Ladies", Ng is seen telling Brenda O'Connor, as he cuts her shirt off with a knife: "You can cry and stuff, like the rest of them, but it won't do any good. We are pretty … cold-hearted, so to speak." In another part of the tape, Kathleen Allen is seen seated in a chair, with Lake warning her: "If you don't go along with us, we'll probably take you into the bed, tie you down, rape you, shoot you, and bury you." In the other, Deborah Dubs is shown being assaulted so severely that she "could not have survived".

Lake's ex-wife, Claralyn Balazs, cooperated with investigators and received legal immunity from prosecution. Court records say that Balazs turned over weapons and other material to authorities during the investigation. She was called as a key witness in Ng's trial in 1999. In a surprise move, Ng's lawyer, William Kelley, dismissed Balazs without asking any questions. Kelley later declined to explain his actions. Balazs was on the witness stand for a few minutes as Kelley read sections of her immunity agreement. Balazs had been expected to shed light on what happened inside the mountain cabin that her parents owned and rented to her and Lake.

Ng, who had never obtained U.S. citizenship, was captured in a department store in Calgary, Alberta, on July 6, 1985. A store security guard suspected him of shoplifting, and in the ensuing confrontation, Ng shot the security guard. Although wounded, the security guard disarmed and detained Ng until police arrived. Ng served four and a half years in a Canadian prison, and tried to fight extradition to the United States on the grounds that he would be subject to capital punishment. In 1991, he was extradited to California, where he was indicted on 12 counts of first-degree murder. Despite the video evidence and the information in Lake's diaries, Ng maintained that he was merely an observer and that Lake planned and committed all of the kidnappings, rapes, and murders unassisted.

In February 1999, Ng was convicted of 11 of the 12 homicides—six men, three women, and two male infants. Jurors deadlocked on the 12th charge, the murder of Paul Cosner, but Ng was sentenced to death. The presiding judge noted: "Mr. Ng was not under any duress, nor does the evidence support that he was under the domination of Leonard Lake."

The last execution in California was in 2006. In 2019, Governor Gavin Newsom signed an executive order placing a moratorium on the death penalty in California.

As of July 2024, Ng was incarcerated at California Medical Facility.

== See also ==
- House on the Hill (2012)
- List of serial killers in the United States
- List of serial killers by number of victims
