= Antonio Cordasco =

Antonio Cordasco (5 June 1863 – 19 April 1921) was an Italian-Canadian labourer, employment agent, banker, and newspaper owner. He was a well-known padrone (migrant labour recruiter and contractor) based in Montreal. He emigrated to the city in 1886 from Calabria and became a British subject in 1902. He also published a newspaper the Corriere del Canada, which helped him recruit migrant labourers from Italy to work on the Canadian Pacific Railway. He was eventually targeted by authorities and accused of making inaccurate claims in order to recruit Italian workers. After a series of public inquiries, the CPR ended its relationship with Cordasco which also ended his recruiting empire.

== Life and career ==
Cordasco was born on 5 June 1863 in Italy, likely in the region of Calabria. He was the son of Tomassina (Tommasina) Gagliardi and Carlo Cordasco. He arrived in Canada in 1886. On April 16, 1891, he married Maria Concetta La Pietra in Montreal. In 1902, he became a naturalized British subject.

Working for the Canadian Pacific Railway (CPR), he climbed ranks in the work crews from laborer to foreman. In 1901, the Canadian Pacific Railway turned to Cordasco for help finding strike-breakers during a labor conflict. Cordasco ultimately supplied the railway with about 2,000 men, by working with recruitment agencies in northeastern American cities. The railway afterwards made him their exclusive recruiter for Italian workers. With his privileged relationship with the CPR, he became what the Dictionary of Canadian Biography describes as the "leading entrepreneur" of the brief "padrone" system of recruiting migrants in Canada. The padrone system, outlawed in the US since 1885, was only regulated by the Canadian government after 1905.

In 1903, he went into private banking, and arranged for earnings to be transferred to families in Italy.

In the spring of 1904, thousands of laborers had traveled to Montreal in response to advertisements by Cordasco and other "padroni." When work season was delayed by weather, the workers had to rely on public assistance. A royal commission was then created to look into the immigration, with Cordasco a prime target of the commission. Judge John Winchester oversaw the proceedings of the inquiry, which led to a number of court battles for Cordasco over unpaid wages and fees. It also led to his termination with CPR.

After the inquiry, Cordasco was not involved with recruitment, but he continued his banking career, and acted as a steamship agent. His private banking business remained operating after Cordasco's death in 1921, with his son Thomas Antonio (Anthony) taking over.
