= Section 30 of the Canadian Charter of Rights and Freedoms =

Charter applies to territorial governments

The territories of Canada (in green), where section 30 applies

Section 30 of the Canadian Charter of Rights and Freedoms is a section that, like other provisions within the section 25 to section 31 block, provides a guide as to how Charter rights should be interpreted and applied by Canadian courts. It addresses how the Charter applies in the territories of Canada. In 1982, when it became law, these were the Northwest Territories and the Yukon Territory. The Yukon Territory is now called Yukon, and Nunavut was created from the eastern Northwest Territories to become Canada's third territory in 1999.

== Text ==
The section reads,

30. A reference in this Charter to a province or to the legislative assembly or legislature of a province shall be deemed to include a reference to the Yukon Territory and the Northwest Territories, or to the appropriate legislative authority thereof, as the case may be.

== Function ==
As the government of Canada puts it on one of its websites, this means that "[t]he Charter applies to the Yukon, the Northwest Territories and Nunavut in exactly the same way as it does to the provinces." Hence, section 30 is particularly important in regard to section 3, 4, 5, 6 and 23 rights. Since section 6 refers to rights to "move to and take up residence in any province" and to "pursue the gaining of a livelihood in any province," section 30 is applied so that section 6 also guarantees rights to move to and pursue work in the territories of Canada. Likewise, section 30 extends section 23's guarantee of minority language educational rights for minority language groups in the provinces to minority language groups in the territories.

Section 30 also guarantees that territorial governments are bound by sections 3 to 5, which themselves only explicitly refer to provincial governments. Hence, those in the territories will have the right to vote or run in territorial elections (section 3), territorial governments cannot operate for longer than 5 years without an election (section 4), and territorial governments must sit at least once a year (section 5).

The other rights in the other sections of the Charter are also valid and enforceable in the territories. The authority of the territorial governments is derived from the Parliament of Canada. Paragraph 32(1)(a) provides that the Charter applies "to the Parliament and government of Canada in respect of all matters within the authority of Parliament including all matters relating to the Yukon Territory and Northwest Territories". Read together, section 30 and paragraph 32(1)(b) provide that the Charter applies "to the legislature and government of each province [and territory] in respect of all matters within the authority of the legislature of each province [and territory]".

The content of section 30 dates back to the original draft of the Charter, which was published in October 1980.

== Judicial interpretation ==
In the case Fédération Franco-ténoise v. Canada (C.A.) (2001), the Federal Court of Appeal discussed section 30 when it rejected the government of the Northwest Territories' claim that the territory now had legal power and independence similar to those of the provinces. (The purpose of this claim was to avoid the obligations of providing official language rights under the Charter, which the federal government has to do but no provinces besides New Brunswick have to do). The territorial government based its theory in Parliament's treatment of the territories, which was becoming more like how it treated the provinces. Some of Parliament's laws had been designed so that they would not be applicable in the territories. Moreover, section 30 created another similarity between the provinces and territories. The Court replied that section 30 of the Charter creates similarities between provinces and territories only in regard to the reading of the Charter.

Section 31, which stipulates that the Charter does not increase powers of legislative bodies, indicates section 30 cannot increase the powers of the territorial legislature to the extent that a territory can achieve equality with the provinces. The Court also rejected the claim by those who had brought legal action against the territorial government that section 30 is limited by section 32; together these two sections simply mean that the Charter applies to all territorial laws.

Earlier, in 1983, similar arguments were made to achieve section 20 rights in the Yukon, so that traffic tickets could be available in the French language. It was argued sections 30 and 32 should together indicate such rights exist in the territories. The courts dismissed the argument since a literal reading of section 20 shows it bounds only the federal government (and New Brunswick), not the territorial governments.
