= Section 12 of the Canadian Charter of Rights and Freedoms =

Constitutional bar on cruel and unusual punishment

Section 12 of the Canadian Charter of Rights and Freedoms, as part of the Constitution of Canada, is a legal rights section that protects an individual's freedom from cruel and unusual punishments in Canada. The section has generated some case law, including the essential case R. v. Smith (1987), in which it was partially defined, and R. v. Latimer (2001), a famous case in which Saskatchewan farmer Robert Latimer protested that his long, mandatory minimum sentence for the murder of his disabled daughter was cruel and unusual.

The section states:

12. Everyone has the right not to be subjected to any cruel and unusual treatment or punishment.

== Definition ==
R. v. Smith was the first case in which section 12 was considered by the Supreme Court of Canada. The Court, however, could and did follow previous interpretations of cruel and unusual punishments in pre-Charter case law, namely Miller and Cockriell v. The Queen (1977). Cruel and unusual punishment was thus defined as punishment "so excessive as to outrage standards of decency" or "grossly disproportionate to what would have been appropriate." Justice Lamer, writing for the Court in R. v. Smith, went on to provide some guides as to how to measure proportionality, listing as special considerations the seriousness of the crime committed by the individual, the "personal characteristics" of the individual, and the various types of punishments available that could effectively "punish, rehabilitate or deter this particular offender or to protect the public from this particular offender."

Later, the Court would add in R. v. Goltz (1991) and R. v. Morrisey (2000) that how the individual would be impacted by the punishment in practise, the objectives of the punishment, whether other kinds of punishments could be used instead, and how other types of criminals are punished could be relevant to a section 12 test. Still, the test is not strict but rather deferential to the government. In Steele v. Mountain Institution (1990), Justice Cory wrote for the Court that a judicial discovery of a cruel and unusual punishment should be "rare and unique". The Parliament of Canada's ability to judge the appropriateness of various punishments is not absolute, but courts are generally encouraged to exercise restraint in correcting Parliament.

In 2020, the Supreme Court of Canada held that section 12 protects humans only, and does not protect corporations.

== Prison sentences ==
If longer than necessary, to a degree that can be considered "grossly disproportionate," certain prison sentences can be considered cruel and unusual and therefore unconstitutional under section 12. In R. v. Smith itself, the prison sentence of an alleged cocaine dealer was deemed so long as to be cruel and unusual under the Charter. While Parliament had the power to make laws in which a certain crime could result in a minimum length of time that must be served in prison, this could be unconstitutional if the law prescribes that same minimum length of time for a type of crime that "covers many substances of varying degrees of danger." Specifically, the law did not consider how much cocaine was involved and why the rights claimant was acquiring it.

The Court again considered whether a minimum prison sentence perceived as lengthy would be cruel and unusual in the case R. v. Latimer. Latimer, who had murdered his disabled daughter, argued the 10 years that he would definitely serve (he could be in prison for longer if denied parole) was so long as to be cruel and unusual. The basis of this argument was that the murder was committed as a type of mercy killing. The Court in this case decided the sentence was not unconstitutional, noting the crime "resulted in the most serious of all possible consequences, namely, the death of the victim." While Latimer had been convicted of second as opposed to first-degree murder, the Court added that "second degree murder is an offence accompanied by an extremely high degree of criminal culpability." In this section 12 case, the principle of mens rea was considered vital.

== Execution ==
In the 2001 extradition case United States v. Burns, the Supreme Court declined to decide whether capital punishment would classify in Canadian law as a cruel and unusual punishment and therefore a direct violation of section 12. They did, however, state that execution certainly "engages the underlying values of the prohibition against cruel and unusual punishment," noting its impossibility to correct (in cases of wrongful conviction) and its perceived "arbitrary" nature, as well as the skepticisms that it really would decrease crime rates. The Court also took into consideration that Parliament had already abolished the death penalty within Canada itself.

== Torture ==
Torture is inherently cruel and unusual under section 12. As the Supreme Court wrote in Suresh v. Canada (Minister of Citizenship and Immigration) (2002), torture is "so inherently repugnant that it could never be an appropriate punishment, however egregious the offence." The Court noted that the "prospect of torture induces fear and its consequences may be devastating, irreversible, indeed, fatal." This view of torture goes back to R. v. Smith, in which Justice Lamer said that "some punishments or treatments will always be grossly disproportionate and will always outrage our standards of decency: for example, the infliction of corporal punishment."

In addition to violating section 12, in Suresh it was found that torture violates rights to liberty and security of person under section 7, and shocks the conscience. Therefore, Canada may not extradite people to countries where they may face torture.
