= Fundamental justice =

Fairness in legal proceedings

In Canadian and New Zealand law, fundamental justice is the fairness underlying the administration of justice and its operation. The principles of fundamental justice are specific legal principles that command "significant societal consensus" as "fundamental to the way in which the legal system ought fairly to operate", per R v Malmo-Levine. These principles may stipulate basic procedural rights afforded to anyone facing an adjudicative process or procedure that affects fundamental rights and freedoms, and certain substantive standards related to the rule of law that regulate the actions of the state (e.g., the rule against unclear or vague laws).

The degree of protection dictated by these standards and procedural rights vary in accordance with the precise context, involving a contextual analysis of the affected person's interests. In other words, the more a person's rights or interests are adversely affected, the more procedural or substantive protections must be afforded to that person in order to respect the principles of fundamental justice. A legislative or administrative framework that respects the principles of fundamental justice, as such, must be fundamentally fair to the person affected, but does not necessarily have to strike the "right balance" between individual and societal interests in general.

The term is used in the Canadian Bill of Rights and the Canadian Charter of Rights and Freedoms and also the New Zealand Bill of Rights Act 1990. Fundamental justice, although closely associated with, is not to be confused with the concepts of due process, natural justice, and Wednesbury unreasonableness.

== Canadian Bill of Rights ==
In written law, the term fundamental justice can be traced back at least to 1960, when the Canadian Bill of Rights was brought into force by the Diefenbaker government. Specifically, section 2(e) of the Canadian Bill of Rights stated that everyone has "the right to a fair hearing in accordance with the principles of fundamental justice for the determination of his rights and obligations." According to the legal scholar Walter Tarnopolsky, the wording of the clause sparked some controversy among those drafting the Bill.

Some wanted the words "natural justice" in the place of "fundamental justice," as "natural justice" was indeed a more common phrase with judges and authors. "Fundamental justice" was a more obscure alternative with these figures (other such alternatives include "universal justice"). Still, "fundamental justice" was chosen, and in the case Duke v. The Queen (1972), it was ruled that fundamental justice was, for the purposes of this case, merely equivalent to natural justice. The author, Chief Justice Fauteux, did say that he was not trying "to formulate any final definition."

Unlike the Canadian Charter of Rights and Freedoms, which was added to the Constitution of Canada in 1982, the Bill of Rights is not a constitutional instrument but rather an ordinary statute. Still, the Canadian Bill of Rights remains in effect, and its guarantee of the "determination" of one's "rights and obligations" through fundamental justice is not precisely duplicated in the Charter. While the term "fundamental justice" does appear in section 7 of the Charter, this is to limit the rights to life, liberty and security of the person. Hence, in the 1985 Supreme Court of Canada case Singh v. Minister of Employment and Immigration, half of the Court found section 2(e) of the Bill of Rights still has a role to play in Canadian law, and they used it to find in favour of the rights claimants.

Justice Jean Beetz, writing for this half of the Court, noted that section 26 of the Charter states that rights outside the Charter are not invalid, and hence the Bill of Rights still has a role to play in Canadian law. Beetz went on to find that in this case, refugees had been denied hearings, and thus their section 2(e) and fundamental justice rights were infringed. The other half of the Court also found in favour of the claimants, but relied instead on section 7 of the Charter.

Later that same year, in MacBain v. Lederman, the Federal Court of Appeal used section 2(e) of the Bill of Rights, and not the Charter, to invalidate parts of the Human Rights Code on the grounds that they could insert bias into a process to determine "rights and obligations."

== Canadian Charter of Rights and Freedoms ==
Since the Canadian Bill of Rights was an ordinary statute, it was not until 1982 when the term fundamental justice was first constitutionalized. The phrase was included in section 7 of the new Canadian Charter of Rights and Freedoms, which asserted that "Everyone has the right to life, liberty and security of the person and the right not to be deprived thereof except in accordance with the principles of fundamental justice."

To limit the rights to life, liberty and security of the person, the authors of the Charter specifically chose the term "fundamental justice" over "due process" because they believed the term "fundamental justice" would still be interpreted to mean conventional "natural justice". "Due process" was rejected because in the United States, use of that term in the constitution led to judges expanding its meaning (see Lochner era) in ways the Canadian government felt would be undesirable. As constitutional scholar Peter Hogg points out in his book Constitutional Law of Canada, the new wording of section 7 removed the context of the "fair hearing" found in the Canadian Bill of Rights, which meant the definition of fundamental justice was now ambiguous and could still be further developed by Canadian courts. This is indeed what happened; since the 1985 Supreme Court decision Re B.C. Motor Vehicle Act, the meaning of the words "fundamental justice" in section 7 has been greatly expanded and encompasses much more than mere procedural rights.

=== Section 24 ===
The term fundamental justice might have some meaning in Charter case law even outside section 7. In the 2003 Charter case Doucet-Boudreau, some Supreme Court justices wished to narrow the scope of the remedial section 24 by citing fundamental justice. In this case, a lower-court judge, after having found the claimants' section 23 rights were violated, used section 24 to demand that the government, while working to repair the infringement of the right, continue to report to him after his ruling. Some Supreme Court justices felt this was an unconstitutional breach of fundamental justice because the judicial order was not clear enough to the government. However, these justices formed the minority of the panel, and the earlier decision was upheld.

Section 24.(1) reads: "Anyone whose rights or freedoms, as guaranteed by this Charter, have been infringed or denied may apply to a court of competent jurisdiction to obtain such remedy as the court considers appropriate and just in the circumstances." A judicial dilemma arises, however, when courts acting under the rule of law fail to guarantee access to justice to applicants seeking review of erroneous lower court decisions.

The principles of fundamental justice of which s. 7 [of the Charter] speaks, though not identical to the duty of fairness elucidated in Baker infra, are the same principles underlying that duty. As Professor Hogg has said, "The common law rules [of procedural fairness] are in fact basic tenets of the legal system, and they have evolved in response to the same values and objectives as s. 7."

In Singh v. Minister of Employment and Immigration, [1985] 1 S.C.R. 177, at pp. 212–13, Wilson J. recognized that the principles of fundamental justice demand, at a minimum, compliance with the common law requirements of procedural fairness. Section 7 protects substantive as well as procedural rights: Re B.C. Motor Vehicle Act, supra. Insofar as procedural rights are concerned, the common law doctrine summarized in Baker infra, properly recognizes the ingredients of fundamental justice. [ Suresh v. Canada (Minister of Citizenship and Immigration), [2002] 1 S.C.R. 3, para. 113; see also: Baker v. Canada (Minister of Citizenship and Immigration), [1999] 2 S.C.R. 817 ].

Access to justice is therefore a democratic safeguard guaranteed by various Charter prerogatives in line with principles of Fundamental Justice which the courts cannot deny for reasons involving budgetary concerns. In Singh supra, at p. 218, Wilson J. speaking for the three members of the Court who addressed the Charter ...doubted that utilitarian consideration[s] ... [could] constitute a justification for a limitation on the rights set out in the Charter (emphasis added). The reason behind Wilson J.'s scepticism was that the guarantees of the Charter would be illusory if they could be ignored because it was administratively convenient to do so. [ Ref re Remuneration of Judges of the Prov. Court of P.E.I.; Ref re Independence and Impartiality of Judges of the Prov. Court of P.E.I., [1997] 3 S.C.R. 3, para. 281 ].
