= Official bilingualism in Canada =

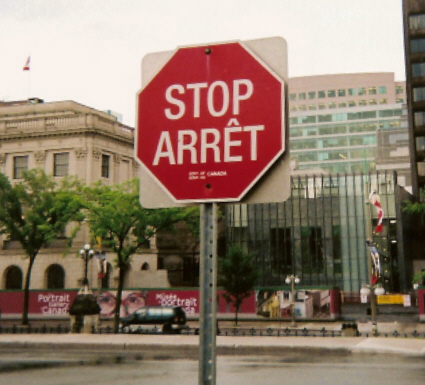
Bilingual (English/French) stop sign on Parliament Hill in Ottawa

The official languages of Canada are English and French, which "have equality of status and equal rights and privileges as to their use in all institutions of the Parliament and Government of Canada," according to Canada's constitution. "Official bilingualism" (French: bilinguisme officiel) is the term used in Canada to collectively describe the policies, constitutional provisions, and laws that ensure legal equality of English and French in the Parliament and courts of Canada, protect the linguistic rights of English- and French-speaking minorities in different provinces, and ensure a level of government services in both languages across Canada.

In addition to the symbolic designation of English and French as official languages, official bilingualism is generally understood to include any law or other measure that:

- mandates that the federal government conduct its business in both official languages and provide government services in both languages;
- encourages lower tiers of government (most notably the provinces and territories, but also some municipalities) to conduct themselves in both official languages and to provide services in both English and French rather than in just one or the other;
- places obligations on private actors in Canadian society to provide access to goods or services in both official languages (such as the requirement that food products be labelled in both English and French);
- provides support to non-government actors to encourage or promote the use or the status of one or the other of the two official languages. This includes grants and contributions to groups representing the English-speaking minority in Quebec and the French-speaking minorities in the other provinces to assist with the establishment of an infrastructure of cultural supports and services.

At the provincial level, the Constitution Act, 1982, recognizes and guarantees the equal status of French and English in New Brunswick. While French has equal legal status in Manitoba restored due to a court ruling, Reference re Manitoba Language Rights, that struck down seventy-year-old English-only laws in 1985, in practice, French language services are only provided in some regions of the province. Quebec has declared itself officially unilingual (French only). Alberta and Saskatchewan are also considered unilingual (English only). In practice, all provinces, including Quebec, offer some services in both English and French and some publicly funded education in both official languages up to the high school level (English-language post-secondary education institutions are also present in Quebec, as are French language post-secondary institutions in other provinces, in particular in Manitoba, Ontario and New Brunswick). English and French are official languages in all three territories. In addition, Inuktitut is also an official language in Nunavut, and nine aboriginal languages have official status in the Northwest Territories.

== History ==
=== Before confederation ===
==== International auxiliary languages ====
Linguistic diversity existed in northern North America long before the arrival of the French and the English. Due to the widespread trade that occurred between many linguistic communities, indigenous linguistic knowledge across northern North America appears to have consisted of bilingualism in the mother language and a pidgin as a standard. The known Pidgins included:

- Algonquian–Basque pidgin (spoken among Basque whalers and various Algonquian peoples and last attested in 1710),
- Broken Slavey (spoken by indigenous and European residents of the Yukon area in the 19th century),
- Chinook Jargon (spoken by members of indigenous, neighbouring, Hawaiian, Chinese, English, French, and other nations throughout the Pacific Northwest; reaching its peak in around 1900 with an estimated 100,000 speakers; and still spoken today),
- Eskimo Trade Jargon (spoken by the Mackenzie River Inuit and the Athabaskan peoples to their South until at least 1909),
- Haida Jargon (spoken mostly by the English and the Haida until the 1830s),
- Labrador Inuit Pidgin French (spoken between Breton and Basque fishermen and the Inuit of Labrador from the late 17th century to about 1760), and
- Plains Indian Sign Language (used by speakers of 37 oral languages in 12 families spread across an area of 2.6 million square kilometres stretching from what is now northern Mexico to the southern Northwest Territories, and from the Pacific Northwest to the Saint-Lawrence Seaway).

French has been a language of administration and governance in Canada since the arrival of French settlers in Acadia (1604) and Quebec (1608), expanding across a vast network of trading posts, forts, and settlements stretching into modern-day Ontario and Western Canada. Following the British Conquest and the subsequent creation of individual colonies and provinces, English became the dominant language of government in most regions, though French remained deeply rooted. Ultimately, the constitutional status of both languages was formally recognized at Confederation in 1867.

Institutional bilingualism in various forms therefore predates the Canadian Confederation in 1867. However, for many years English occupied a de facto privileged position, and French was not fully equal. The two languages have gradually achieved a greater level of equality in most of the provinces, and full equality at the federal level. In the 1970s French in Quebec became the province's official language.

=== After confederation ===
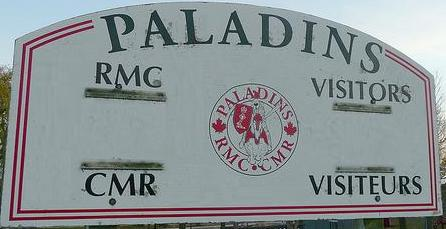
Royal Military College Paladins Bilingual (English/French) Scoreboard, inner field, Royal Military College of Canada

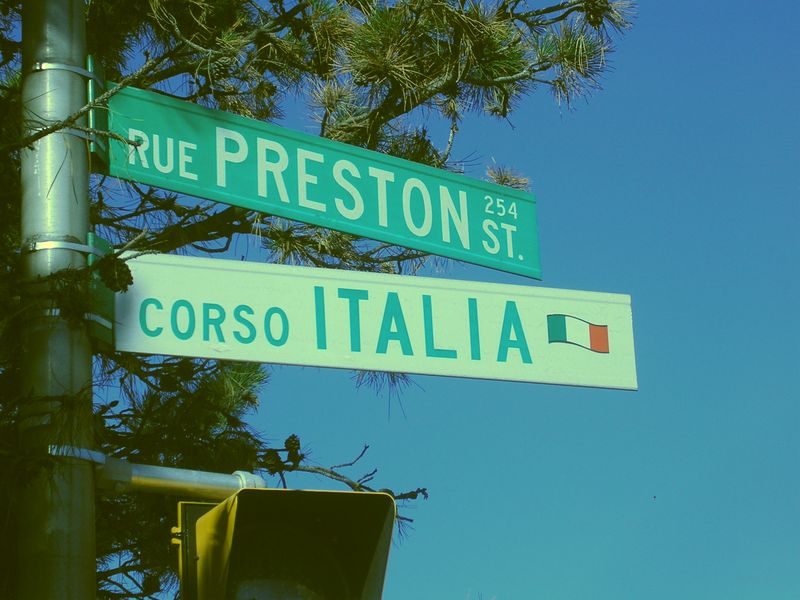
Bilingual (French/English) sign for Preston Street (rue Preston) in Ottawa, placed above a sign marking that the street is in Little Italy, an example of bilingualism at the municipal government level

In 1867, the use of both English and French for federal statutes, parliamentary debates, and parliamentary publications, was mandated by Section 133 of the Constitution Act, 1867. Section 133 also protects the right of individuals to use either English or French in federal courts.

== Constitutional provisions on official languages ==
=== Constitution Act, 1867 (Section 133) ===
English and French have had limited constitutional protection since 1867. Section 133 of the Constitution Act, 1867 guarantees either language may be used in federal courts and the Parliament of Canada, and must be used in its parliamentary journals, records, and acts.

Similar obligations are placed on the Province of Quebec.

=== Canadian Charter of Rights and Freedoms (Sections 16–23) ===
Language rights are primarily provided in sections 16–23 of the Canadian Charter of Rights and Freedoms, which became law in 1982 and declares English and French Canada's official languages. Sections 16–19 guarantee them equal status in federal parliament, government institutions and courts; require all statutes, records and journals of Parliament be published in both languages; and give both those versions equal authority. Section 20 guarantees each Canadian's right to English or French communication with every central office of the federal government and with each of its regional offices on which exists "a significant demand for communication with and services from that office". Significant demand is not defined in the Charter itself but in the Official Languages Act of 1988.

The Charter of Rights and Freedoms places similar constitutional obligations on the Province of New Brunswick, making it the only officially bilingual province in Canada. (Both languages are official in all three territories by statute: Yukon, Nunavut along with Inuit languages, and the Northwest Territories along with Inuit, Métis, and many First Nations languages besides.)

Section 21 ensures that the Charter supplements, rather than replaces, any English or French language rights constitutionalized previously. Section 22 ensures that the Charter does not affect rights of other languages.

=== Education rights (Sections 23 and 59 of the Constitution Act, 1982) ===
Section 23 provides a limited right to receive publicly funded primary and secondary-schooling in the two official languages when they are "in a minority situation"—in other words, to English-language schooling in Quebec, and to French-language schooling in the rest of the country.

==== Asymmetrical application of education rights in Quebec versus elsewhere in Canada ====
The right applies asymmetrically because section 59 of the Constitution Act, 1982, provides that not all of the language rights listed in section 23 will apply in Quebec. Specifically:

- In Quebec, a child may receive free public education in English only if at least one parent or a sibling was educated in Canada in English.
- In the rest of Canada, a child may receive free public education in French if at least one parent or a sibling was educated in Canada in French, or if at least one parent has French as his or her mother tongue (defined in section 23 as "first language learned and still understood").

None of these education language rights precludes parents from placing their children in a private school (which they pay for) in the language of their choice; it applies only to subsidized public education.

One practical consequence of this asymmetry is that all migrants who arrive in Quebec from foreign countries only have access to French-language public schools for their children. This includes immigrants whose mother tongue is English and immigrants who received their schooling in English. On the other hand, Section 23 provides a nearly universal right to English-language schooling for the children of Canadian-born anglophones living in Quebec.

Section 23 also provides, "where numbers warrant", a right to French-language schooling for the children of all francophones living outside Quebec, including immigrants who become Canadian citizens.

However, admission to French-language schools outside Quebec remains restricted in some ways it is not in Quebec. In particular, rights-holding parents who choose to enroll their child in English school may thereby deprive that child's descendants of the right to attend French school. In Quebec, under article 76.1 of the Charter of the French Language, rights holders do not deprive their descendants of the right to an English-language education by choosing to enroll their children in French school. (This applies if certain administrative steps are taken at each generation. Otherwise, the right may still be transmitted to grandchildren under article 76.)

Another element of asymmetry between Quebec and most anglophone provinces is that while Quebec provides public English-language primary and secondary education throughout the province, most other provinces provide French-language education only "where numbers warrant".

==== Additional restrictions on education rights ====
There are some further restrictions on minority-language education rights:

1. The rights attach to the parent, not the child, and non-citizens residing in Canada do not have access to this right (even if their children are born in Canada).
2. If the parent's English-language or French-language education took place outside Canada, this in itself would not entitle the child to be educated in that language—only the parent's mother tongue would.
3. The right to receive public schooling can only be exercised in localities where "...the number of children of citizens who have such a right is sufficient to warrant the provision to them out of public funds...."

==== Ambiguous definition of entitlement to education rights ====
The phrase, "where numbers ... warrant" is not defined in Section 23. Education is under provincial jurisdiction, which means that it has not been possible for Parliament to enact a single nationwide definition of the term, as the 1988 Official Languages Act did for the constitutional obligation to provide federal services where "there is a sufficient demand." As a result, disputes over the extent of the right to a publicly funded minority-language education have been the source of much litigation.

The defining case was Mahe v. Alberta (1990), in which the Supreme Court of Canada declared that section 23 guaranteed a "sliding scale". In certain circumstances, the children whose parents could exercise the right might be so few that literally no minority language education may be provided by the government. With a greater number of children, some schools might be required to provide classrooms in which the children could receive minority language education. An even greater number would require the construction of new schools dedicated solely to minority language education. More recent cases, which have significantly extended these rights, include Arsenault-Cameron v. Prince Edward Island (2000) and Doucet-Boudreau v. Nova Scotia (Minister of Education) (2003).

=== Language of the official text of the Constitution ===
Many of the documents in Canada's Constitution do not have an official French-language version; for legal purposes only the English-language version is official and any French translations are unofficial. In particular, the Constitution Act, 1867 (which created Canada as a legal entity and still contains the most important provisions of governmental powers) has no official French-language version because it was enacted by the United Kingdom Parliament, which functions in the English language exclusively. Similarly, all other parts of the Constitution that were enacted by the United Kingdom (with the important exception of the Canada Act 1982) have no official French-language version.

Sections 55–57 of the Constitution Act, 1982 set out a framework for changing this situation. Section 55 calls for French versions of all parts of the Constitution that exist only in English to be prepared as quickly as possible. Section 56 provided that, following adoption of the French versions, both the English-language and French-language versions would be equally authoritative. To avoid the situation where an inaccurately translated French version would have a weight equal to the English original, Section 55 requires that the French-language versions be approved using the same process under which actual constitutional amendments are adopted. Pursuant to section 55, a French constitutional drafting committee produced French-language versions of all the Constitution Acts in the decade following 1982. However, these versions were never ratified under the Constitution's amendment procedure, and therefore have never been officially adopted.

Section 57 states that the "English and French versions of this Act [i.e. the Constitution Act, 1982] are equally authoritative." The purpose of this provision is to clear up any ambiguity that might have existed about the equal status of the two versions as a result of the novel way in which this part of Canada's supreme law came into force. Had the Constitution Act, 1982 been enacted as most preceding amendments to Canada's constitution had been, as a statute of the British parliament, it would, like any other British statute, have been an English-only document. Instead, the British parliament enacted a very concise law (the Canada Act 1982), written in English only. The operative clauses of the Canada Act, 1982 simply state that an appendix to the act (the appendix is formally referred to as a "schedule") is to be integrated into the Canadian constitution. The schedule contains the complete text of the Constitution Act, 1982, in both English and French.

== Federal legislation on official languages ==
=== Official Languages Act ===
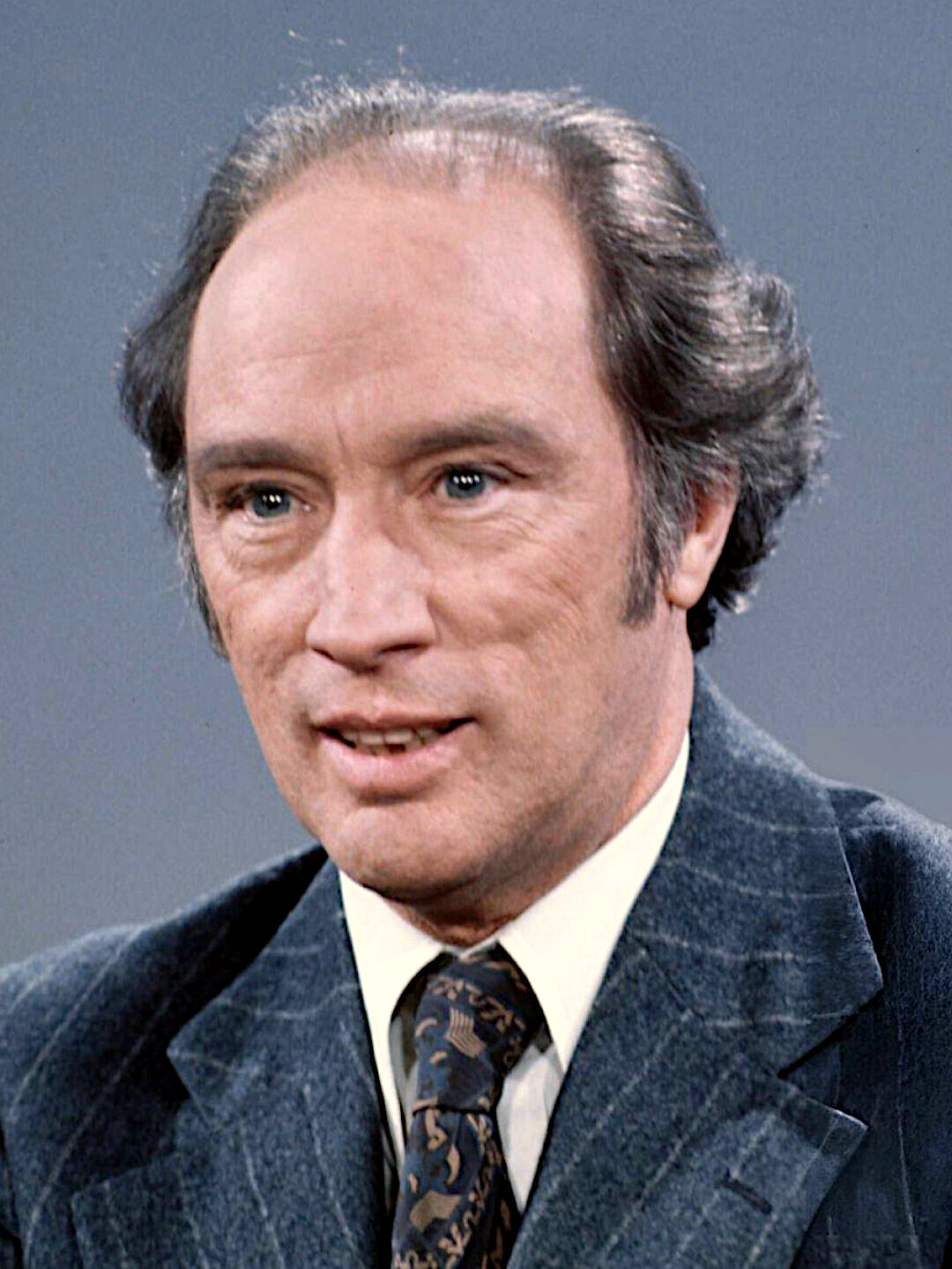
Pierre Trudeau is the father of the Official Languages Act, which in 1969 made Canada officially bilingual.

Bilingual logo of the Government of Canada

Canada adopted its first Official Languages Act in 1969, in response to the recommendations of the Royal Commission on Bilingualism and Biculturalism. The current Official Languages Act was adopted in 1988 to improve the 1969 law's efforts to address two basic policy objectives: (1) to specify the powers, duties and functions of federal institutions relevant to official languages; (2) to support the development of linguistic minority communities. As well, following the adoption in 1982 of the Charter of Rights, it was necessary to create a legislative framework within which the Government of Canada could respect its new constitutional obligations regarding the official languages.

In addition to formalizing Charter provisions in Parts I through IV, the act adopts several specific measures to achieve these objectives. For example, Part V specifies that the work environment in federal institutions in the National Capital Region and other prescribed bilingual regions be conducive to accommodating the use of French and English at work. Part VI mandates that English-speaking Canadians and French-speaking Canadians not be discriminated against based on ethnic origin or first language learned when it comes to employment opportunities and advancement.

Finally, the act establishes a Commissioner of Official Languages and specifies their duties to hear and investigate complaints, make recommendations to Parliament, and delegate authority in matters pertaining to official languages in Canada. Canada's current Commissioner of Official Languages is Kelly A. Burke.

Section 32 of the Official Languages Act authorizes the Governor in Council (i.e., the federal cabinet) to issue regulations that define the geographic regions where the federal government offers services in the relevant minority language (English in Quebec and French elsewhere). This provides a legal definition for the otherwise vague requirement that services be provided in the minority official languages wherever there is "significant demand." The definition used in the regulations is complex, but basically an area of the country is served in both languages if at least 5,000 persons in that area or 5% of the local population (whichever is smaller) belongs to that province's English or French linguistic minority population. Regulations were first promulgated in 1991.

== US influence on the status of English and French in Canada ==
Book I Chapter 1.C of the report of the Royal Commission on Bilingualism and Biculturalism, published on 8 October 1967, acknowledges the international influence on Canadian language policy:

Compared to other bilingual states – among them Finland, South Africa, and Belgium, which we shall discuss later – Canada is fortunate that her official languages both have international status… In Canada, however, one of the two language groups begins with a considerable advantage. As the national language of the United States, one of the most powerful countries of the world, English has a massive preponderance in North America. Thus the English-language group in this country draws much of its strength from the English-speaking population of our neighbour. The French-language group is, on the other hand, a minority on the North American continent and suffers from its isolation not only from France but from the other French speaking peoples of the world.

== Official bilingualism in the public service ==
The issue of proportional hiring and promotion of speakers of both official languages has been an issue in Canadian politics since before Confederation. Members of each linguistic group have complained of injustice when their group have been represented, in public service hiring and promotion, in numbers less than would be justified by their proportion of the national population. For the greater part of Canada’s history, French-speakers were underrepresented, and English-speakers were overrepresented in the ranks of the public service, and the disproportion became more pronounced in the more senior ranks of public servants. However, this trend has reversed itself in recent decades.

The first high-profile complaint of preferential hiring took place in 1834. One of the Ninety-Two Resolutions of the Lower Canadian House of Assembly drew attention to the fact that French Canadians, who at the time were 88% of the colony's population, held only 30% of the posts in the 157-member colonial civil service. Moreover, the resolution stated, French Canadians were, "for the most part, appointed to the inferior and less lucrative offices, and most frequently only obtaining even them, by becoming the dependent of those [British immigrants] who hold the higher and the more lucrative offices...."

With the advent of responsible government in the 1840s, the power to make civil service appointments was transferred to elected politicians, who had a strong incentive to ensure that French Canadian voters did not feel that they were being frozen out of hiring and promotions. Although no formal reform of the hiring and promotion process was ever undertaken, the patronage-driven hiring process seems to have produced a more equitable representation of the two language groups. In the period between 1867 and the turn of the Twentieth Century, French-Canadians made up about one-third of the Canadian population, and seem also to have represented about one-third of civil service appointments at junior levels, although they had only about half that much representation at the most senior level.

== Language policies of Canada's provinces and territories ==
Canada's thirteen provinces and territories have adopted widely diverging policies with regard to minority-language services for their respective linguistic minorities. Given the wide range of services, such as policing, health care and education, that fall under provincial jurisdiction, these divergences have considerable importance.

=== New Brunswick ===
Of Canada's ten provinces, only one (New Brunswick) has voluntarily chosen to become officially bilingual. New Brunswick's bilingual status is constitutionally entrenched under the Canadian Charter of Rights and Freedoms. Sections 16–20 of the Charter include parallel sections guaranteeing the same rights at the federal level and at the provincial level (New Brunswick only).

- Section 16(2) is a largely symbolic statement that "English and French are the official languages of New Brunswick" with "equality of status".
- Section 17(2) guarantees the right to use English or French in the New Brunswick legislature
- Section 18(2) states that New Brunswick's laws will be bilingual, with both texts equally authoritative, and that official publications will be bilingual.
- Section 19(2) guarantees the right to use either official language in all New Brunswick court proceedings.
- Section 20(2) guarantees the right to receive provincial government services in either official language.

=== Manitoba ===
Manitoba is the only province that was officially bilingual at the time of its establishment. Following the Red River Rebellion led by the Francophone Métis Louis Riel, the Manitoba Act was passed, creating the province and mandating the equal status of English and French in all legislative bodies, legislative records, laws and court proceedings. At this time, Manitoba had a majority Francophone population, but within 20 years mass immigration from Ontario and non-Francophone countries had reduced the Francophone proportion of the population to less than 10%. In 1890, the provincial government of Thomas Greenway stripped funding from the French school system and revoked the equal status of French, a controversial move that caused tension between French and English speakers throughout Canada.

Despite the protests of Franco-Manitobans that the act had been violated, Manitoba remained monolingual in practice until the early 1980s, when legal challenges created a crisis that threatened to invalidate almost all laws passed in Manitoba since 1890, on the grounds that these statutes were not published in French as required by the act. The provincial government under Howard Pawley tried and failed to address the crisis, with the opposition refusing to attend legislative sessions. In 1985 the Supreme Court ruled that the act had been violated and that all provincial legislation must be published in both French and English, restoring the legal equality of the languages that had existed when the province was created. While this restoration of legal equality faced overwhelming public opposition at the time, polls taken in 2003 showed a majority of Manitobans supported provincial bilingualism.

Due to Manitoba's unique history, it has a complex bilingual profile combining that of a province with a "small official-language minority and one with constitutional protection of said minority". Currently, the French Language Services Policy guarantees access to provincial government services in French, though in practice French language services are available only in some areas. Public primary and secondary education is provided in both French and English, and parents are free to choose instruction in either language. Post-secondary Francophone education is provided by the Université de Saint-Boniface, the oldest university in Western Canada.

=== Quebec ===
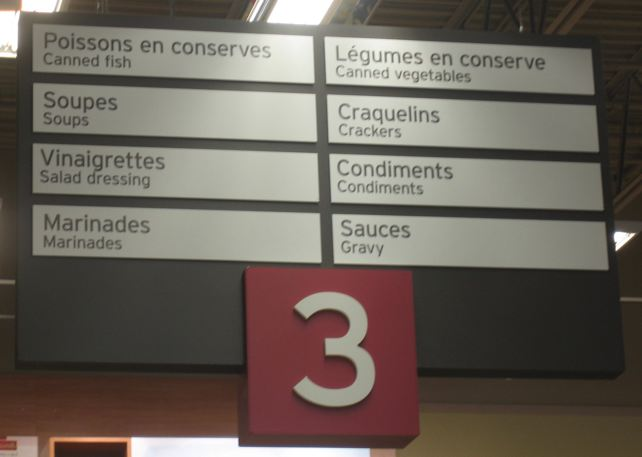
Bilingual sign in a Quebec supermarket with markedly predominant French text

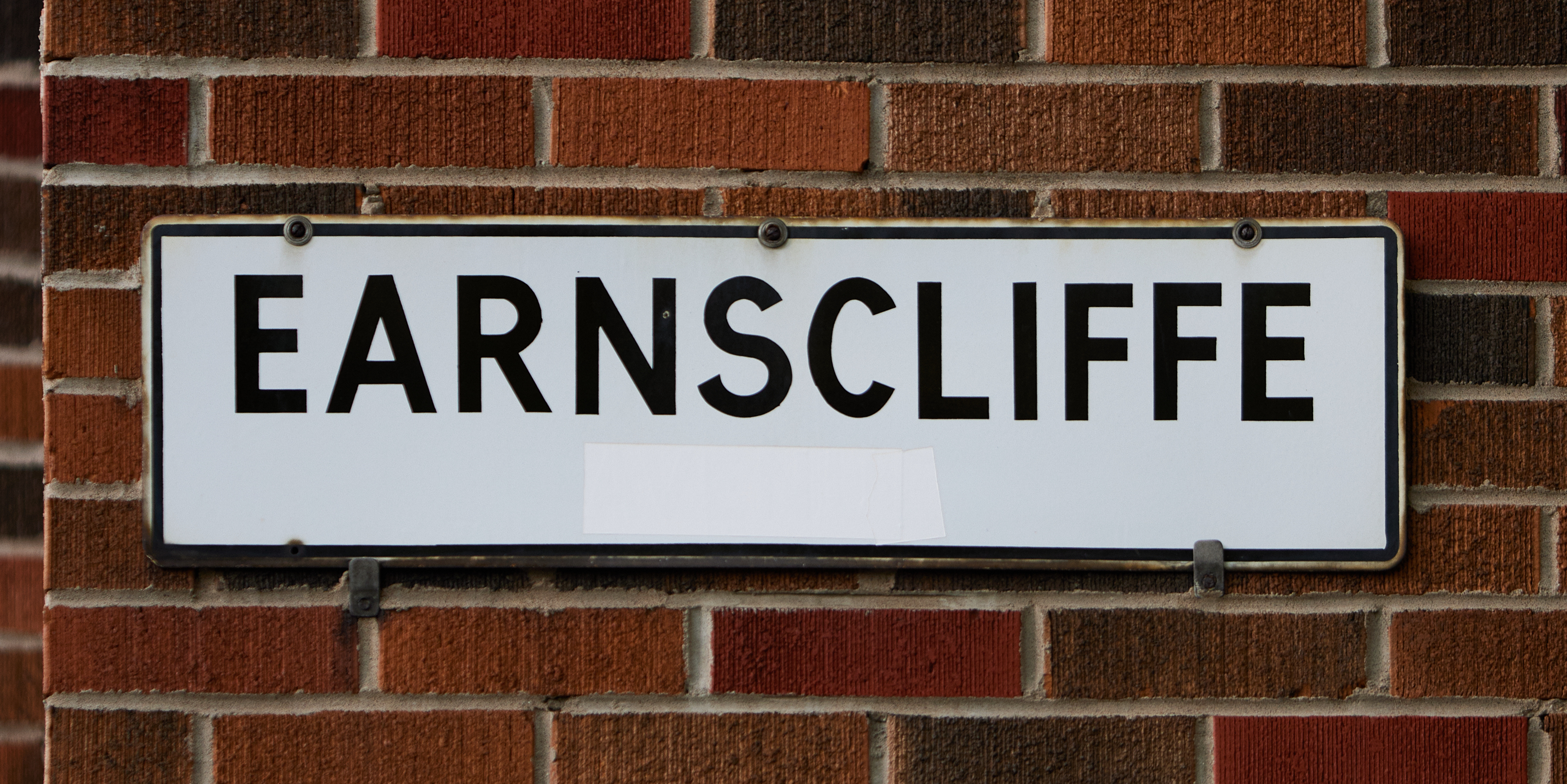
Older street sign in Montreal with the word "Avenue" covered up. Although avenue is a loan word from the French language to the English language, in French it would precede the street name Earnscliffe.

French has been the only official language in Quebec since 1974, when the Liberal government of Robert Bourassa enacted The Official Language Act (better-known as "Bill 22"). However, the province's language law does provide for limited services in English. As well, the province is obliged, under Section 133 of the Constitution Act, 1867, to allow the provincial legislature to operate in both French and English, and to allow all Quebec courts to operate in both languages. Section 23 of the Charter applies to Quebec, but to a more limited degree than in other provinces. Quebec is required to provide an education in English to all children whose Canadian citizen parents were educated in English in Canada, while all other provinces are required to provide an education in French to the children of Canadian citizen parents who either received their education in French in Canada or whose native tongue is French.

In 1977, the Parti Québécois government of René Lévesque introduced the Charter of the French Language (better known as "Bill 101") to promote and preserve the French language in the province, indirectly disputing the federal bilingualism policy. Initially, Bill 101 banned the use of all languages but French on most commercial signs in the province (except for companies with four employees or fewer), but those limitations were later loosened by allowing other languages on signs, as long as the French version is predominant. Bill 101 also requires that children of most immigrants residing in Quebec attend French-language public schools; the children of Canadian citizens who have received their education in Canada in English may attend English-language public schools, which are operated by English-language school boards throughout the province. The controversy over this part of Quebec's language legislation has lessened in recent years as these laws became more entrenched and the public use of French increased.

Quebec's language laws have been the subject of a number of legal rulings. In 1988, the Supreme Court of Canada ruled in the case of Ford v. Quebec (A.G.) that the commercial sign law provisions of Bill 101, which banned the use of the English language on outdoor signs, were unconstitutional. In 1989, the Quebec National Assembly invoked the notwithstanding clause of the Charter of Rights to set aside enforcement of the court ruling for five years. A UN appeal of the 'McIntyre Case' resulted in a condemnation of Quebec's sign law – regardless of the legality of the notwithstanding clause under Canadian law. In response, in 1993 Quebec enacted amendments to the sign law, availing itself of the suggestions proposed in the 1988 Supreme Court ruling by allowing other languages on commercial signs, subject to French being markedly predominant .

On 31 March 2005, the Supreme Court of Canada ruled unanimously that the interpretation made by the provincial administration of the "major part" criterion in Quebec's language-of-instruction provisions violated the Canadian Charter of Rights and Freedoms. This criterion allows students who have completed the "major part" of their primary education in English in Canada to continue their studies in English in Quebec. The court did not strike down the law but, as it had done in its 1988 ruling on sign laws, presented the province with a set of criteria for interpreting the law in conformity with the Charter of Rights, broadening the interpretation of the phrase "major part".

It is also illegal for signs on streets and highways in Quebec to contain English translations, thus most road signs in Quebec are in French-only although in 2018 efforts were underway to change that.

On 24 May 2022, Bill 96 was passed, amending the Charter of the French Language, with 78 MNAs in favour (from the Coalition Avenir Québec and Québec solidaire) and 29 against (from the Liberal Party and Parti Québécois).

=== Territories ===
French and English are official languages in Canada's three federal territories: Yukon, Nunavut, and the Northwest Territories. Nunavut and the Northwest Territories also accord official language status to several indigenous languages. Inuktitut and Inuinnaqtun are official in Nunavut, being languages of the territory's Inuit population.

The Northwest Territories accords official status to nine aboriginal languages (Chipewyan, Cree, Gwich’in, Inuinnaqtun, Inuktitut, Inuvialuktun, North Slavey, South Slavey, and Tłįchǫ/Dogrib). NWT residents have the right to use any of the territory's eleven official languages in a territorial court and in debates and proceedings of the legislature. However, laws are legally binding only in their French and English versions, and the government publishes laws and other documents in the territory's other official languages only when asked by the legislature. Furthermore, access to services in any language is limited to institutions and circumstances where there is significant demand for that language or where it is reasonable to expect it given the nature of the services requested. In practice, this means that only English language services are universally available, and there is no guarantee that any particular government service will use other languages except the courts. Following a 2006 territorial supreme court ruling, Fédération Franco-Ténoise v. Canada (Attorney General), universal French-language services are also mandatory.

This is despite the fact that the proportion of native French-speakers in the territories is negligible, and they are vastly outnumbered by speakers of indigenous languages. At the 2016 census, there were 1,455 "mother-tongue" speakers of French in Yukon (4.3%), 1,175 in the Northwest Territories (2.9%), and 595 in Nunavut (1.7%).

=== Elsewhere in Canada ===
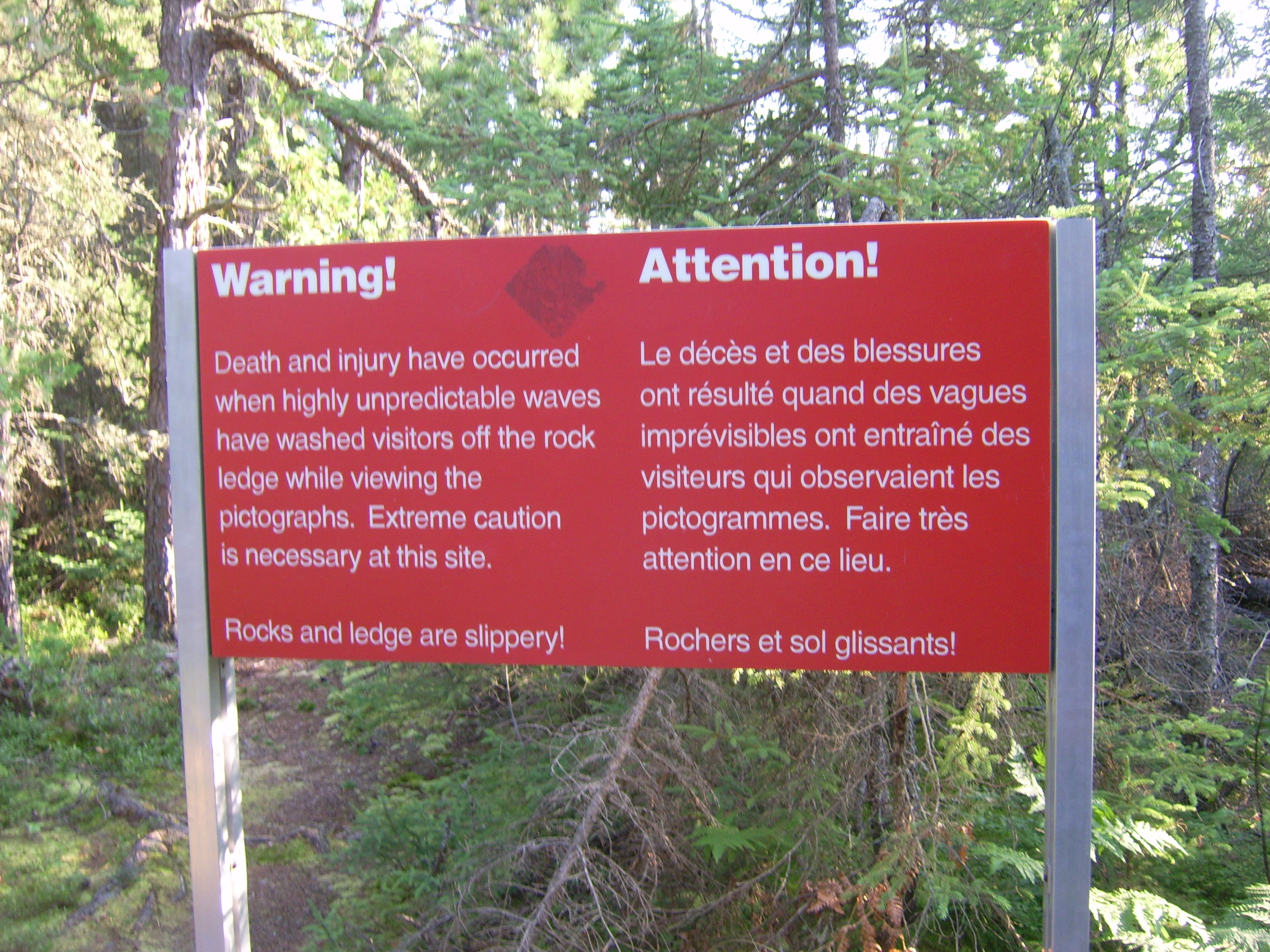
A bilingual English and French sign in Lake Superior Provincial Park

In the English-majority provinces that did not officially adopt English as an official language, English is the de facto language of government services and internal government operations. Service levels in French vary greatly from one province to another (and sometimes within different parts of the same province).

For example, under the terms of Ontario's 1986 French Language Services Act, Francophones in 25 designated areas across the province—but not in other parts of the province—are guaranteed access to provincial government services in French. Similarly, since 2005, the City of Ottawa has been officially required under Ontario law to set a municipal policy on English and French.

In Alberta, the Alberta School Act protects the right of French-speaking people to receive school instruction in the French language in the province.

== Language rights in the legal system ==
There is considerable variation across Canada concerning the right to use English and French in legislatures and courts (federal, provincial and territorial). Rights under federal law are consistent throughout Canada, but different provinces and territories have different approaches to language rights. Three provinces (Manitoba, New Brunswick and Quebec) have constitutional guarantees for bilingualism and language rights. Three other provinces (Alberta, Ontario and Saskatchewan) have statutory provisions relating to bilingualism in the legal system, as do each of the three territories (Northwest Territories, Nunavut and Yukon). Four provinces (British Columbia, Newfoundland and Labrador, Nova Scotia and Prince Edward Island) are unilingual English.

Language rights in the legal system are summarized in the following table:

Jurisdiction	Right to use English & French in Parliament/Legislature	Laws are Bilingual	Right to use English or French in the courts	Right to Trial in Language of Choice (English or French)
Canada	Yes.	Yes.	Yes.	Criminal: Yes; Federal offences: Yes; Civil: Yes
Alberta	Yes.	No: English only.	Yes, but only in oral submissions, not written.	Criminal: Yes; Provincial offences: No; Civil: No
British Columbia	No: English only.	No: English only.	No: English only.	Criminal: Yes; Provincial offences: Yes; Civil: No
Manitoba	Yes.	Yes.	Yes.	Criminal: Yes; Provincial offences: Yes; Civil: No
New Brunswick	Yes.	Yes.	Yes.	Criminal: Yes; Provincial offences: Yes; Civil: Yes
Newfoundland and Labrador	No: English only.	No: English only.	No: English only.	Criminal: Yes; Provincial offences: No; Civil: No
Nova Scotia	No: English only.	No: English only.	No: English only.	Criminal: Yes; Provincial offences: No; Civil: No
Ontario	Yes.	Yes.	Yes.	Criminal: Yes; Provincial offences: Yes; Civil: No
Prince Edward Island	No: English only.	No: English only.	No: English only.	Criminal: Yes; Provincial offences: No; Civil: No
Quebec	Yes.	Yes.	Yes.	Criminal: Yes; Provincial offences: Yes; Civil: No
Saskatchewan	Yes.	Laws and regulations can be in English only, or in both English and French.	Yes.	Criminal: Yes; Provincial offences: Yes; Civil: No
Northwest Territories	Yes, as well as any of the other nine official territorial languages.	Yes.	Yes. A party can also use one of the other nine official languages for oral submissions.	Criminal: Yes; Territorial offences: Yes; Civil: Yes
Nunavut	Yes, and also the Inuit language.	Yes.	Yes, and also the Inuit language.	Criminal: Yes; Territorial offences: Yes; Civil: Yes
Yukon	Yes, and also Yukon aboriginal languages.	Yes.	Yes.	Criminal: Yes; Territorial offences: Yes; Civil: Yes

== Personal bilingualism in Canada ==
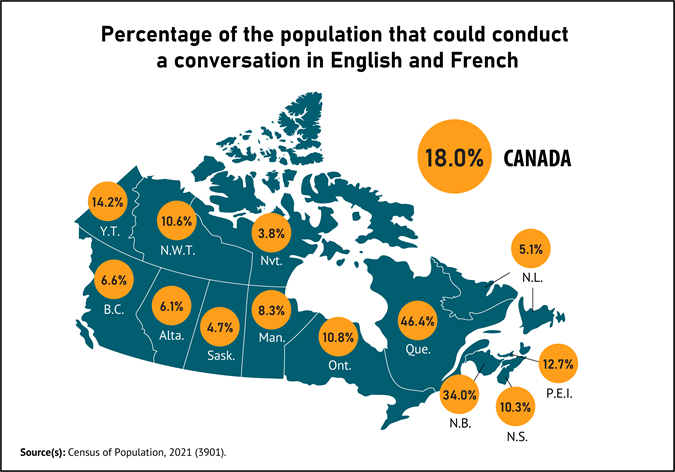
English-French bilingualism rate in Canada (2021 census)

Official bilingualism should not be confused with personal bilingualism, which is the capacity of a person to speak two languages. This distinction was articulated in the 1967 report of the Royal Commission on Bilingualism and Biculturalism, which stated:

A bilingual country is not one where all the inhabitants necessarily have to speak two languages; rather it is a country where the principal public and private institutions must provide services in two languages to the citizens, the vast majority of whom may well be unilingual."

Nonetheless, the promotion of personal bilingualism in English and French is an important objective of official bilingualism in Canada.

At least 35% of Canadians speak more than one language. Moreover, fewer than 2% of Canadians cannot speak at least one of the two official languages. However, of these multilingual Canadians, somewhat less than one fifth of the population (5,448,850 persons, or 17.4% of the Canadian population) are able to maintain a conversation in both of the official languages according to a self-assessment. However, in Canada the terms "bilingual" and "unilingual" are normally used to refer to bilingualism in English and French. In this sense, nearly 83% of Canadians are unilingual.

Knowledge of the two official languages is largely determined by geography. Nearly 95% of Quebecers can speak French, but only 40.6% speak English. In the rest of the country, 97.6% of the population is capable of speaking English, but only 7.5% can speak French. Personal bilingualism is most concentrated in southern Quebec and a swath of territory sometimes referred to as the bilingual belt, which stretches east from Quebec through northern and eastern New Brunswick. It also extends into eastern Ontario, with Ottawa, eastern, and northeastern Ontario holding large populations of Franco-Ontarians. There is also a large French-speaking population in Manitoba. In all, 55% of bilingual Canadians are Quebecers, and a high percentage of the bilingual population in the rest of Canada resides in Ontario and New Brunswick. Statistics Canada collects much of its language data from self-assessments.

The following table lists the number of respondents in the 2021 Canadian census that were bilingual in both official languages of Canada:

Province or territory	% of bilingual English & French speakers	Total bilingual English & French speakers	Ref.
Canada—Total	18%	6,581,680	
British Columbia	6.6%	326,865	
Alberta	6.1%	258,330	
Saskatchewan	4.7%	51,970	
Manitoba	8.3%	110,435	
Ontario	10.8%	1,519,365	
Quebec	46.4%	3,898,980	
New Brunswick	34%	260,120	
Nova Scotia	10.%	98,940	
Prince Edward Island	12.7%	19,385	
Newfoundland and Labrador	5.1%	25,945	
Nunavut	3.8%	1,380	
Northwest Territories	10.6%	4,295	
Yukon	14.2%	5,660	

== Second-language education ==
Canada’s thirteen provincial and territorial education systems place a high priority on boosting the number of bilingual high school graduates. For example, in 2008 New Brunswick's provincial government reconfirmed its goal of boosting the percentage of bilingualism among graduates from its current rate of 34% to 70% rate by 2012. In 2003, the federal government announced a ten-year plan of subsidies to provincial education ministries with the goal of boosting bilingualism among all Canadian graduates from its then-current level of 24% to 50% by 2013.

=== French second-language education (FSL) ===
Three methods of providing French second-language education (known as "FSL") exist side by side in each of the provinces (including Quebec, where extensive French-language education opportunities are available for the province’s large population of non-Francophone children):

- Core French
- French Immersion
- Extended French
- Intensive French

==== Core French ====
Non-Francophone students learn French by taking courses on the French language as part of an education that is otherwise conducted in English. In Quebec and New Brunswick, French courses begin in Grade 1. In the other provinces, they typically start in Grade 4 or 5. Students normally receive about 600 hours of French-language class by the time of graduation. The goal of "Core French" programs is not to produce fully bilingual graduates, but rather "to provide students with the ability to communicate adequately in the second language, and to provide students with linguistic tools to continue their second-language studies by building on a solid communicative base". There are no mandatory core French class in British Columbia, Alberta or Saskatchewan, and second-language courses are mandatory only in BC. One result of this is that comprehension levels are often lower than parents would prefer. A scholar who interviewed a former New Brunswick premier, as well as the province's deputy ministers of education and health and the chairman of its Board of Management and Official Languages Branch reports: "[A]ll expressed reservations about the effectiveness of the Core program in promoting individual bilingualism and believed the program must be improved if anglophone students are to obtain a level of proficiency in the French language."

==== French immersion ====
Non-Francophone students with no previous French-language training learn French by being taught all subjects in the French language, rather than by taking courses on the French language as part of an education otherwise conducted in English. In early immersion, students are placed in French-language classes starting in kindergarten or Grade 1.

In late immersion, children are placed in French-language classes in a later grade. Currently, 7% of eligible students outside of Quebec are enrolled in French immersion programs.

==== Extended French program ====
Some schools in Ontario offer a third method of FSL education: the Extended French program. Students enter into this program as early as Grade 4—the starting grade is set by each region's school board—and may continue the program through to graduation. The program can also be entered when beginning secondary school; however, as there is a prerequisite number of previous instruction hours, usually only students previously enrolled in the Extended French or French Immersion programs can enter. In this program, at least 25% of all instruction must be in French. From Grades 4 through 8, this means that at least one course per year other than "French as a Second Language" must be taught solely in French. From Grades 9 through 12, along with taking the Extended French language course every year, students must complete their mandatory Grade 9 Geography and Grade 10 Canadian History credits in French. Students who complete these required courses and take one extra credit taught in French receive a certificate upon graduation in addition to their diploma.

==== Intensive French ====
Intensive French is a method of FSL education that originated in Newfoundland. In 2004, Intensive French began in some schools in British Columbia. Intensive French is a choice program (in offering schools). For the first five months of the grade 6 school year, students spend 80% of their time learning French, with the other 20% being for math. The rest of the core curriculum (Social Studies, Science, and Language Arts in English) is condensed for the second half of the year, comprising 80% of the time, with one hour for French. In the grade 7 year students continue to have one hour of core French per day. This results in 600 hours of French instruction over the two years.

=== English second-language education (ESL) ===
New Brunswick, being an officially bilingual province, has both anglophone and francophone school districts.

- The francophone districts have Core English programs teaching ESL.

Quebec's education system provides ESL on a more restricted basis to the children of immigrants and to students who are members of the province's Francophone majority.

- Core English: Most non-anglophone students are required to enrol in French-language schools. English is taught to all students, starting in Grade 1, in a program that is essentially identical to the "Core French" taught to English-speaking students in the other provinces.
- Most high schools offer advanced-level ESL programs where students complete the K–11 program in Secondary 3 (Grade 9) and follow with first-language level in Grade 10 and 11 (literature class).
- Programs of English immersion have existed for French-speaking students in Quebec but these programs are often in conflict with the official language policies of the Quebec government.

== Educational, linguistic, economic, and other challenges of official bilingualism ==
=== Success rates in second-language instruction ===
In Parlez-vous francais? The advantages of bilingualism in Canada, published by the Canadian Council on Learning, page 6 states:

Although most Canadian school children are taught English or French as a second language in school, these lessons often fail to yield functional bilingualism. For example, New Brunswick’s French Second Language Commission recently reported that fewer than 1% of the students who enrolled in "core French" in 1994 had met the provincial minimum goal by 2007. And fewer than 10% of students who enrolled in early-French immersion in 1995 had attained the provincial goal by 2007.

The State of French-Language Education Programs in Canada: Report of the Standing Committee on Official Languages, published in 2014, presents the following quote from the Peel District School Board’s Committee from 2011-2012:

The review committee found that although principals were finding it very difficult to hire teachers who are qualified to teach French immersion, qualifications alone were not enough to ensure a quality program. ‘The review committee heard repeatedly from different stakeholders regarding instances where a teacher had the requisite paper qualifications but was not fluent in French. Furthermore, the review committee heard that qualified and fluent teachers sometimes chose to leave the French immersion program to teach in the English program. The review committee heard that although it is very difficult for principals to find French immersion teachers for permanent contract teaching assignments, it is even more problematic for them to find FI teachers for long-term occasional assignments.

Section 4.6 of L’amélioration de l’enseignement de l’anglais, langue seconde, au primaire: un équilibre à trouver, published by the Conseil supérieur de l’éducation (in Quebec) in 2014 reveals a struggle to recruit enough qualified second-language teachers for public schools in Quebec too.

Federal party leaders often master the official languages poorly themselves and even Senate translators might fail to master their languages of work well enough to provide trustworthy translations.

According to an article in the Globe and Mail published on 13 February 2019:

Growing demand from parents for French immersion has created a shortage of teachers in many parts of the country, with some school boards settling for educators who can speak French only slightly better than their students, according to a new report.

=== Dependence on translation in the Government of Canada ===
Jean Delisle stated in an article titled Fifty Years of Parliamentary Interpretation:

Interpretation is a good barometer of government activity. In the 1960s, a decade that interpreter Ronald Després called the "golden age of simultaneous interpretation," it was not unusual for interpreters to put in 80-hour weeks. Marguerite Ouimet said that she spent more time in a booth than at home, as did many of her colleagues. From the mid-1970s onward, technician Jean-Pierre Dulude, whose outstanding skill was widely recognized in interpretation circles, supervised the installation of some 60 interpreters’ booths on Parliament Hill, and in federal departments and buildings across the country.

The article goes on to state, "The House cannot sit without interpreters and it has adjourned when the interpretation system experienced technical difficulties."

A report of the Advisory Working Group on the Parliamentary Translation Services of the Standing Committee on Internal Economy, Budgets and Administration revealed on 15 March 2018:

Many of the respondents cited inconsistency and quality control as major issues when it came to translation. The quality of the service varies greatly from one translator to another and there are often errors in the translations even when a request for a secondary review is made. Some respondents noted that the two language versions of committee reports often do not convey the same meaning and that, in some cases, the translation is simply erroneous. Much time is reportedly spent by senators and staff reviewing the documents in question and ensuring that the translation is accurate. Other respondents reported that longer documents that had been translated by more than one individual were disjointed and difficult to read because a common style had not been used. Recommendations ranged from the need to hire specialized translators to facilitate the translation of committee reports on technical matters, to ensuring proper revision of translations before their delivery, and to the need to provide for a feedback mechanism that could be used to alert the Translation Bureau when errors were detected. Issues related to the quality of interpretation were also raised. Some senators reported hearing literal translations that did not convey the true meaning of what the speaker had said. Others noted that regional expressions were not properly interpreted. Many respondents asked if it would be possible to have the same interpreters covering the Chamber and specific committees as this would ensure continuity. The need to upgrade the Senate's technological equipment was raised as devices in some committee rooms did not work properly. Some committee clerks noted that a more modern way for clerks to provide material to the interpreters was needed. Such technological upgrades could make communication of information quicker and more efficient.

=== Direct monetary cost of official bilingualism ===
In Official Language Policies of the Canadian Provinces: Costs and Benefits in 2006, published by the Fraser Institute in 2012, we read on page xii:

In our previous study, Official Language Policies at the Federal Level in Canada: Costs and Benefits in 2006, we estimated that the total cost of federal bilingualism at $1.8 billion. Since these expenditures include transfers to provinces that are spent by them on official language programs (Vaillancourt and Coche, 2009: 25, table 1), aggregating federal, provincial, and local spending must net out these transfers to avoid double counting. Once transfers are netted out, we have $1.5 billion at the federal level and $868 million at the local and provincial level for a total rounded of $2.4 billion or $85 per capita for 2006/07.

=== Distribution of wealth between official and deaf, indigenous, and other unofficial linguistic communities ===
In Making the Most of the Action Plan for Official Languages 2018–2023: Investing in Our Future, the Standing Committee on Official languages states: ‘CPF British Columbia and Yukon has already identified three strategies: recruiting from other provinces and territories and from abroad; supporting post-secondary institutions so they can train more teachers; and supporting teachers.’

The linguistic provisions of the Canadian Charter of Rights and Freedoms, the Official Languages Act, the Consumer Packaging and Labelling Act, the Immigration and Refugee Protection Act, and other laws obligate a greater demand for English and French speakers (even foreign ones if necessary) than a freer linguistic market would require. This, combined with English and French being more difficult to learn than some languages due to their orthographic (especially for the Deaf, dyslexics, and Deaf-dyslexics), grammatical, and lexical particularities, accentuates the wealth gap between official and Deaf, indigenous, and other unofficial language communities by limiting market supply and blocking equal access to Federal and federally-regulated employment ranging from the packaging and labelling industries all the way up to appointments to the Supreme Court of Canada for unofficial language communities. Perry Bellegarde and Romeo Sagansh have addressed this concern as it applies to indigenous peoples.

In Parlez-vous francais? The advantages of bilingualism in Canada, published by the Canadian Council on Learning, page 4 states:

The bilingual advantage appears to extend to individual income. According to the 2001 Canadian census, people who speak both official languages had a median income ($24,974) that was nearly 10% higher than that of those who speak English only ($22,987) and 40% higher than that of those who speak French only ($17,659). Similar gaps remain after controlling for individual characteristics such as educational attainment and work experience.

While the inherent difficulties of English and French can prevent some from learning them well, their international spread can greatly benefit those who have the means to learn them well.

=== The perception of official bilingualism as an exclusively bi-ethnocentric policy ===
The mandate of the Royal Commission on Bilingualism and Biculturalism was to

inquire into and report upon the existing state of bilingualism and biculturalism in Canada and to recommend what steps should be taken to develop the Canadian Confederation on the basis of an equal partnership between the two founding races, taking into account the contribution made by the other ethnic groups to the cultural enrichment of Canada and the measures that should be taken to safeguard that contribution.

The same report clarifies the status of Canada’s indigenous peoples relative to "the two founding races" in its Book I, General Introduction, Paragraph 21:

We should point out here that the Commission will not examine the question of the Indians and the Eskimos. Our terms of reference contain no allusion to Canada's native populations. They speak of "two founding races," namely Canadians of British and French origin, and "other ethnic groups," but mention neither the Indians nor the Eskimos. Since it is obvious that these two groups do not form part of the "founding races," as the phrase is used in the terms of reference, it would logically be necessary to include them under the heading "other ethnic groups." Yet it is clear that the term "other ethnic groups" means those peoples of diverse origins who came to Canada during or after the founding of the Canadian state and that it does not include the first inhabitants of this country.

Chapter I, Paragraph 19 states:

Still, as we have pointed out earlier, there is such a thing as a French culture and a British culture. Of course, the differences between them are not as great as they would be if either were compared to one of the many Asian or African cultures. In Canada, the Anglophones and the Francophones wear the same sort of clothing, live in the same sort of houses, and use the same tools . They are very similar in their social behaviour, belong to religions which are not exclusive, and share the same general knowledge. To a greater or lesser extent, they share a North American way of living.

Book II, Chapter V.E.1, Paragraph 325 indicates that the government's policy with reference to indigenous Canadians was ‘to integrate these students as completely as possible into the existing provincial school systems.’

Commissioner J. B. Rudnyckyj wrote a separate statement challenging his colleagues’ proposals for an exclusively Anglo-French language policy. Esperanto Services, Ottawa; the Indian-Eskimo Association of Canada, Toronto; and other organizations representing different indigenous and other unofficial-language communities likewise presented briefs that presented alternative notions to that of 'two founding races.'

=== Francophone and Indigenous linguistic relations ===
In an Article in the National Post of 10 November 2017, Member of Parliament Romeo Saganash stated in reference to requiring Supreme Court judges to speak English and French:

All Indigenous people in Canada speak one official language or the other, English or French," Saganash argued. "To exclude that part of the population from the possibility of sitting on the Supreme Court has always seemed unacceptable to me.

Senator Murray Sinclair has opposed requiring Supreme Court judges to know both official languages too.

An issue has been raised about the amount the federal government spends on francophone education in Nunavut, compared to the amount it spends for Indigenous language education: "According to numbers from Nunavut Tunngavik Inc., the federal government spends 44 times more on French in Nunavut than it does Inuktut—roughly $8,200 per Francophone speaker, versus just $186 per Inuktut speaker."

In response to the appointment of Mary Simon (who is bilingual in English and Inuktitut) to the position of Governor General in July 2021, political scientist Stéphanie Chouinard, an assistant professor at Canada's Royal Military College in Kingston, Ontario, said that the Trudeau government has put Canada's francophone communities in an "impossible position": "No one in Canada wants to be against reconciliation," she said. "Francophone communities know better than most what it means to be a linguistic minority and how important it is to acknowledge Indigenous languages." But Chouinard said English Canadians would likely balk if a governor general spoke an Indigenous language and French but not a word of English."

In the fall of 2022, further Franco-indigenous tensions erupted after the Treasury Board rejected an idea pitched by some Indigenous public servants to offer "blanket exemptions" so they don't have to learn both of Canada's official languages.

=== Conflict of principles ===
Prior to and at the start of European settlement, indigenous peoples, probably owing to the multiplicity of their languages, had embraced the principle of an international auxiliary language and personal bilingualism.

By the 1960s, indigenous Canadians had already started to apply this principle to English. John Curotte, Chairman of the Caughnawaga Defence Committee, in a brief presented by that Committee to the Royal Commission on Bilingualism and Biculturalism in 1965, states:

As to two languages, it has long been accepted that Red Men are entitled to their own original ancient language which precedes that of the languages of the Western World by thousands of years. However the Red Man welcomes, for the purpose of survival in a world of competition, a second language, which has proven to be the English language despite some 320 years of association with the French language which was the first white man's language heard by the Iroquois in about 1645. It is clear that we are part of a two-language world. (Caughnawaga Defence Committee, 1965, 3)

Though some French Canadians have likewise embraced the principle of an international auxiliary language and personal bilingualism, some prefer to apply this principle to Esperanto.

French Canadians in positions of political power or influence continue to reject the principle of an international auxiliary language (and especially of English playing that role) in favour of the right of the 'two founding peoples' to personal unilingualism and the obligation of the state to serve them in their mother languages.

== Proposed alternatives to official bilingualism based on the personality principle ==
=== Official bi-unilingualism based on the territoriality principle ===
In Lament for a Notion, Scott Reid proposes maintaining the present official languages but deregulating them, limiting them mostly to the official sphere, and applying the territoriality principle except where numbers warrant it.

Former Quebec Premier Jean Charest had called on the Federal Government to apply the Charter of the French Language to all federally-regulated institutions operating in the province of Quebec.

Up until its reaction to the Government of Ontario's decision to eliminate the Office of the Commissioner of Francophone services in October 2018, Quebec had tended to oppose calls on the part of French-speakers to broaden French-language rights outside of that province, such as when it opposed the Commission scolaire francophone du Yukon’s call to gain the ability to admit more students to its French-language schools at the Supreme Court of Canada fearing that a victory for the French-language school board in Yukon could have negatively affected the promotion of French in Quebec.

=== Official indigenous multilingualism based on the personality principle ===
In an article written by Gloria Galloway and published in the Globe and Mail on 8 July 2015, Galloway writes about how the Assembly of First Nations wants to make all of Canada’s indigenous languages official. She writes:

‘The head of the Assembly of First Nations is calling for the nearly 60 indigenous languages spoken in Canada to be declared official along with English and French, an expensive proposition but one that he says is becoming more urgent as the mother tongues of aboriginal peoples disappear. ‘Perry Bellegarde, who was elected National Chief of the AFN last fall, agrees it would not be easy to require translations of all indigenous languages to be printed on the sides of cereal boxes and milk cartons.

‘"That would be the ultimate goal," Mr. Bellegarde said in an interview on Wednesday at the three-day annual general meeting of the AFN, Canada's largest indigenous organization. "But let's do small steps to get there."’ Romeo Saganash has expressed the belief that Members of Parliament have a constitutional right to speak any of Canada’s indigenous languages in Parliament.

=== Official indigenous multi-unilingualism based on the territoriality principle ===
Given the logistic and economic challenges of official multilingualism based on the personality principle, some proponents of an equal right to the indigenous language have proposed a policy of official indigenous unilingualism based on the territoriality principle whereby a local or regional government would have an obligation to provide services only in the local indigenous languages but not in any other of Canada’s indigenous languages. Some First Nations already apply this principle on territory under their jurisdiction.

=== Official multilingualism or multi-unilingualism including one or more official sign languages whether according to the personality or territoriality principle ===
Some have proposed that Canada adopt ‘sign language’ as one of its official languages.

=== Official interlingualism through an international auxiliary language ===
Others have argued that parents should be entitled to public funding for education in the language of their choice for their children according to market supply and demand and Esperanto as a second language. It is argued that such a policy would conform to the Universal Declaration of Human Rights.

== Support and opposition ==
=== Poll data ===
Polls show that Canadians consistently and strongly support two key aspects of Canadian official languages policy:

- bilingual federal government services,
- the right of official-language minorities to receive an education in their maternal language.

However, among English-speaking Canadians there is only limited support for broadening the scope of official bilingualism, and reservations exist among Anglophones as to the intrusiveness and/or fairness of the policy. Among Francophones, polls have revealed no such reservations.

Among Anglophones, support for providing federal French-language services to French-speakers living outside Quebec has remained consistently high over a quarter-century period—79% in 1977 and 76% in 2002. Over the same period, support among English-speakers for the "right to French language education outside Quebec where numbers make costs reasonable" has ranged from 79% to 91%. Among French-speaking Canadians, support for these policies was even higher.

The national consensus has, at times, broken down when other aspects of official bilingualism are examined. However, a significant shift in anglophone opinion has occurred since the mid-2000s, in favour of bilingualism.

According to a review of three decades' worth of poll results published in 2004 by Andre Turcotte and Andrew Parkin, "Francophones in Quebec are almost unanimous in their support of the official languages policy" but "there is a much wider variation in opinion among Anglophones ..."

This variation can be seen, for example, in responses to the question, "Are you, personally, in favour of bilingualism for all of Canada?" Between 1988 and 2003, support for this statement among Francophones ranged between 79% and 91%, but among Anglophones support was never higher than 48%, and fell as low as 32% in the early 1990s. The ebb in support for bilingualism among anglophones can likely be attributed to political developments in the late 1980s and 1990s, including the failure of the Meech Lake Accord, and the 1995 referendum on Quebec independence.

By 2006, affirmative responses to the question "Are you personally in favour of bilingualism for all of Canada?" had increased considerably, with 72% of Canadians (and 64% of anglophones) agreeing. 70% of Canadians, and 64% of anglophones were "in favour of bilingualism for [their] province". Support for bilingualism is thought likely to continue to increase, as young anglophones are more favourable to it than their elders.

According to Turcotte and Parkin, other poll data reveal that "in contrast to Francophones, Anglophones, in general, have resisted putting more government effort and resources into promoting bilingualism... What is revealing, however, is that only 11% of those outside Quebec said they disagreed with bilingualism in any form. Opposition seems to be directed to the actions of the federal government, rather than to bilingualism itself ... [T]his distinction is key to understanding public opinion on the issue." This helps to explain results that would otherwise seem contradictory, such as a 1994 poll in which 56% of Canadians outside Quebec indicated that they either strongly or moderately supported official bilingualism, but 50% agreed with a statement that "the current official bilingualism policy should be scrapped because it's expensive and inefficient."

In English Canada, there is some regional variation in attitudes towards federal bilingualism policy, but it is relatively modest when compared to the divergence between the views expressed by Quebecers and those expressed in the rest of the country. For example, in a poll conducted in 2000, only 22% of Quebecers agreed with the statement, "We have gone too far in pushing bilingualism," while positive response rates in English Canada ranged from a low of 50% in the Atlantic to a high of 65% in the Prairies.

Both French-speaking and English-speaking Canadians tend to regard the capacity to speak the other official language as having cultural and economic value, and both groups have indicated that they regard bilingualism as an integral element of the Canadian national identity. Once again, however, there is a marked divergence between the responses of French-speaking and English-speaking Canadians. In a 2003 poll, 75% of Francophones indicated that "having two official languages, English and French" made them proud to be Canadian. Among English-speakers, 55% said that bilingualism made them proud, but far higher percentages (86% and 94%, respectively) indicated that multiculturalism and the Charter of Rights made them feel proud.

=== Findings of public hearings ===
From time to time, boards or panels are commissioned, either by the federal government or the government of one of the provinces, to conduct hearings into the public’s views on matters of policy. Some of these hearings have dealt largely, or even primarily, with official languages policy, and the responses that they have collected provide snapshots into the state of public opinion at particular points in time.

==== Findings of the public hearings into the Poirier-Bastarache Report (1985) ====
The Advisory Committee on the Official Languages of New Brunswick was commissioned by the provincial legislature as a way of determining the response of the population to the 1982 Poirier-Bastarache Report, which had recommended a considerable expansion of French-language services. Public hearings were conducted in twelve cities and towns across the province in 1985, and a report was submitted by the committee in 1986.

The briefs submitted to the Advisory Committee were subsequently summarized in an academic study of the hearings in the following terms:

Qualitative analysis illustrate[s] that, as the majority, anglophones are reticent about extending opportunities and services to the francophone minority for fear of placing themselves at a disadvantage, whether it be in the education system or civil service employment. Francophones, as the minority, resent the anglophone hesitancy to make available rights and privileges secured under the Official Languages Act of New Brunswick of 1969 and the Constitution Act (1982) ... They favour their own schools, control over their education, increased access to civil service positions and services in their own language through separate institutions and administrations.

==== Findings of the Spicer Commission (1990) ====
In late 1990, a six-man Citizens’ Forum on Canada’s Future was established by the federal government with a mandate to engage in "a dialogue and discussion with and among Canadians ... to discuss the values and characteristics fundamental to the well-being of Canada". The Forum, which was headed by former Commissioner of Official Languages Keith Spicer, published a report in June 1991, which included a detailed discussion of Canadians’ reactions to a variety of issues, including federal official languages policy.

These comments, which probably represent the most extensive consultation ever with Canadians on the subject of official bilingualism, were compiled statistically by the Spicer Commission, and tend to reinforce the findings of pollsters, that Canadians are favourable towards bilingual services, but frustrated with the implementation of official languages policy. Thus, for example, nearly 80% of group discussions sponsored by the Commission produced favourable comments from participants on what the commission's report refers to as "bilingualism generally", but nearly 80% of these discussions produced negative comments on "official languages policy".

These results prompted Spicer to write,

Canada's use of two official languages is widely seen as a fundamental and distinctive Canadian characteristic. Among many, especially the young, the ability to speak, read and write both French and English is accepted as a significant personal advantage. Even many parents who dislike "official bilingualism" are eager to enrol their children in French immersion. On the other hand, we find that the application of the official languages policy is a major irritant outside Quebec, and not much appreciated inside Quebec ... In spite of real and needed progress in linguistic fair play in federal institutions, a sometimes mechanical, overzealous, and unreasonably costly approach to the policy has led to decisions to that have helped bring it into disrepute. Citizens tell us that bilingual bonuses, costly translation of technical manuals of very limited use, public servants' low use of hard-acquired French-language training, excessive designation of bilingual jobs, and a sometimes narrow, legalistic approach are sapping a principle they would otherwise welcome as part of Canada's basic identity.

=== Advocacy groups ===
Advocacy in support of expanding / extending official bilingualism exclusively of other language communities

A number of groups exist, which, as part of their mandate, seek to promote official bilingualism or to extend the scope of the policy (although advocacy is not always the sole, or even the primary activity, of the groups). Among these groups:

- Alliance Quebec (defunct)
- L'Association des municipalités francophones du Nouveau-Brunswick
- Canadian Parents for French, established with the assistance of the Commissioner of Official Languages in 1977, promotes French second-language education for children whose mother tongue is English;
- Commission nationale des parents francophones
- Fédération des communautés francophones et acadienne du Canada: serves as an umbrella for 22 groups representing French-speaking minorities in different provinces and territories;
- Fédération des jeunes francophones du Nouveau-Brunswick
- Fédération nationale des conseils scolaires francophones
- Francophone Association of Municipalities of Ontario seeks to oversee the maintenance and development of municipal government services in French, in Ontario municipalities with French-speaking populations.
- Impératif français: seeks to promote the use of French within Quebec, and to challenge inequalities between the languages that may arise within areas of federal administration.
- Quebec Community Groups Network: serves as an umbrella for 38 English language community organizations across Quebec for the purposes of supporting and assisting the development and enhancing the vitality of the English-speaking minority communities;
- Société des Acadiens et Acadiennes du Nouveau-Brunswick

Advocacy in favour of restraining or abolishing official bilingualism

A number of groups have existed, since the first Official Languages Act was proclaimed in 1969, which sought to end official bilingualism or to reduce the scope of the policy. Among these groups:

- The Alliance for the Preservation of English in Canada (often referred to as "APEC"). In 2000, the group was renamed Canadians Against Bilingualism Injustice. In 2001, the organization changed its name again, becoming the Canadian Network for Language Awareness.
- The New Brunswick Association of English-speaking Canadians was formed in 1984 and disbanded in 1986. Its primary purpose was to oppose the proposals of the province's "Poirier-Bastarache Committee" for an expansion of the province's policy of official bilingualism.

In the first decade or so following the 1969 adoption of the act, opposition to the new policy sometimes took a radical form that has subsequently nearly disappeared. Books such as Jock V. Andrew's Bilingual Today, French Tomorrow, advocated either the repeal of the Official Languages Act or an end to the policy of official bilingualism. Leonard Jones, the mayor of Moncton, New Brunswick, was an aggressive opponent of bilingualism in the late 1960s and early 1970s. Jones challenged the validity of the Official Languages Act in court, arguing that the subject matter was outside the jurisdiction of the federal government. In 1974, the Supreme Court of Canada ruled against Jones, and found the law constitutional. In 1991, a local resurgence in anti-bilingualism sentiments allowed the Confederation of Regions Party to win 21.2% of the vote in New Brunswick's provincial election and to briefly form the official opposition with eight seats in the provincial legislature.

Some organizations or individuals within certain movements also propose introducing a more inclusive language policy either via official multilingualism, or an official unilingual language policy in an auxiliary language so as to intrude minimally into the first-language choice of residents. Such ideas are sometimes inspired by Article 1 of the Universal Declaration of Human Rights relating to discrimination on the basis of language, and Article 26(3) of the same Declaration so as to give parents the freedom "to choose the kind of education that shall be given to their children." Others can be inspired by religious or other beliefs.

=== Positions of the federal political parties ===
==== Language issues dividing the parties ====
The issues on which Canada’s political parties have most recently shown divergent voting patterns are two private members’ bills.

The first, An Act to amend the Official Languages Act (Charter of the French Language) (Bill C-482), was introduced by Bloc MP Pauline Picard. If adopted, it would have had the effect of amending the Official Languages Act, the Canada Labour Code, and the Canada Business Corporations Act, to cause them to conform to the Charter of the French Language, "effectively making the federal government French-only in the province," according to Maclean’s. This bill was defeated in May 2008, with Bloc and NDP MPs voting in favour and Conservative and Liberal MPs opposed.

The second private member’s bill is NDP MP Yvon Godin’s Act to amend the Supreme Court Act (understanding the official languages) (Bill C-232). If adopted, this bill will have the effect of blocking any candidate who is not already sufficiently bilingual to understand oral arguments in both official languages from being appointed to the Supreme Court. This bill was passed at third reading on 31 March, with all NDP, Liberal and Bloc members in support and all Conservative MPs opposed. but did not pass the Senate.

==== Conservative Party of Canada and its predecessors ====
The Conservative Party of Canada was created in 2003 by the merger of the old Progressive Conservative Party of Canada and the Canadian Alliance. The new party adopted the principles of the old Progressive Conservatives as its founding principles, with only a handful of changes. One of these was the addition of the following founding principle, which is lifted almost verbatim from Section 16(1) of the Charter of Rights:

"A belief that English and French have equality of status, and equal rights and privileges as to their use in all institutions of the Parliament and Government of Canada."

At its founding convention in 2005, the new party added the following policy to its Policy Declaration (the official compilation of the policies that it had adopted at the convention):

"The Conservative Party believes that Canada’s official languages constitute a unique and significant social and economic advantage that benefit all Canadians.

"i) A Conservative Government will support the Official Languages Act ensuring that English and French have equality of status and equal rights and privileges as to their use in all institutions of the Parliament and Government of Canada.

"ii) The Conservative Party will work with the provinces and territories to enhance opportunities for Canadians to learn both official languages."

Prior to this, in the 1980s and 1990s, the Reform Party of Canada had advocated the policy's repeal. However, the party's position moderated with time. By 1999, the Blue Book (the party's declaration of its then-current policies) stated that "The Reform Party supports official bilingualism in key federal institutions, such as Parliament and the Supreme Court, and in critical federal services in parts of the country where need is sufficient to warrant services on a cost-effective basis." By 2002, the policy declaration of the Reform Party's political successor, the Canadian Alliance, had been moderated further, and stated that it was "the federal government's responsibility to uphold minority rights" by providing services in both languages in any "rural township or city neighbourhood where at least ten percent of the local population uses either English or French in its daily life".

==== Liberal Party of Canada ====
The Liberal Party sees itself as the party of official bilingualism, as it was a Liberal prime minister, Pierre Trudeau, who enacted the first Official Languages Act in 1969 and who entrenched detailed protections for the two official languages in the Charter of Rights and Freedoms in 1982.

The depth of the party’s commitment to official bilingualism is demonstrated by the fact that the constitution of the Liberal Party contains provisions modelled almost word-for-word on Section 16(1) of the Charter of Rights: "English and French are the official languages of the Party and have equality of status and equal rights and privileges as to their use in all federal institutions of the Party. In pursuing its fundamental purposes and in all its activities, the Party must preserve and promote the status, rights and privileges of English and French."

==== New Democratic Party ====
New Democrat MPs voted in favour of the 1969 Official Languages Act, the 1988 Official Languages Act, and the protections for the two official languages contained in the Charter of Rights. More recently, the party has edged towards supporting an asymmetrical version of bilingualism. Early in 2008, the party’s languages critic, Yvon Godin, stated that its MPs would vote in favour of a bill, sponsored by the Bloc Québécois, which would cause federal institutions to operate on a French-preferred or French-only basis in Quebec.

In 2017, NDP MP Romeo Saganash spoke forcefully against making Anglo-French bilingualism a requirement for Supreme Court judges in addition to criticizing official bilingualism generally due to the linguistic barriers it imposes on indigenous candidates.

==== Bloc Québécois ====
Although the main objective of the Bloc Québécois is to assist in the independence of Quebec, the party’s parliamentary caucus has maintained an active interest in issues relating to official languages policy (for example, sending MPs to participate in the standing Commons committee on official languages). The party seeks to alter federal language policy, as it applies within Quebec, so as to eliminate the statutory equality of English that is guaranteed under the Official Languages Act and other federal legislation. In recent years, this has included introducing a private member's bill titled An Act to amend the Official Languages Act (Charter of the French Language) (better known as Bill C-482), intended to supersede the Official Languages Act with the Charter of the French Language for all federally regulated corporations within Quebec, this principle uses an asymmetrical conception of federalism in Canada.

=== Positions of other political figures ===
==== W. A. C. Bennett ====
B.C. premier W. A. C. Bennett mused that Pierre Trudeau implemented bilingualism because he was a Quebec‐oriented politician who was mainly interested in promoting and protecting French Canada.

== See also ==
- Quebec (AG) v Blaikie (No 1)
- Charlebois v Saint John (City of)
- Language demographics of Quebec
- R v Beaulac
- Société des Acadiens v Association of Parents
- Spanish language in the United States – similar issue in the United States
- Anglophone problem - relating to the power balance between English and French in bilingual Cameroon
- Canadian French
