= Section 21 of the Canadian Charter of Rights and Freedoms =

Continuation of constitutional language rights

Section 21 of the Canadian Charter of Rights and Freedoms is one of several sections of the Charter relating to the official languages of Canada. The official languages, under section 16 of the Charter, are English and French. Sections 16 to 20 guarantee a number of rights in regard to the use of these languages in the federal and New Brunswick courts and other government institutions. Thus, section 21 clarifies that language rights regarding English and French in the Constitution of Canada, outside the Charter, remain valid and are not limited by the language rights within the Charter.

== Text ==
In full, it reads,

21. Nothing in sections 16 to 20 abrogates or derogates from any right, privilege or obligation with respect to the English and French languages, or either of them, that exists or is continued by virtue of any other provision of the Constitution of Canada.

== Function ==
Section 21 thus reaffirms language rights in the Constitution in respect to the provinces of Quebec and Manitoba. Although neither of these provinces are officially bilingual, there are constitutional rights regarding the use of English and French in those provinces that are not duplicated in the Charter. Specifically, section 133 of the Constitution Act, 1867 guarantees that anyone in the Quebec legislature (now known as the National Assembly of Quebec) may speak in either language, and that the records of the National Assembly must be kept in both languages. Furthermore, bilingualism is allowed in Quebec courts.

The same rights are guaranteed in respect to the federal government under section 133, but these are repeated in section 17, section 18 and section 19 of the Charter.

The Manitoba Act, which created the province of Manitoba in 1870 and is considered part of the Constitution of Canada, contains similar language rights. Section 23 of that Act states that everyone may speak in English or French in the legislature and in Manitoba courts, and that the records of the legislature must be kept in both languages. These rights, too, are not duplicated by the Charter but are reaffirmed by section 21 of the Charter.

== Comparisons to other Charter sections ==
Whereas section 16 can be used to guarantee rights to those working in government offices to use either French or English, it has been noted that the rights referred to in section 21 do not.

Section 21 can be better compared to some of the sections under the heading "General" (sections 25–31). This is because it is "negative in form," not guaranteeing rights but protecting pre-existing ones. Like section 21, section 29 protects rights (in this case denominational school rights) that appear elsewhere in the Constitution. Section 25 refers to Aboriginal rights and section 26 refers to other rights not in the Charter, although unlike section 21 these sections recognize rights outside the Constitution.
