= Official Languages Act (Canada) =

Canadian federal law of 1969

The Official Languages Act (French: Loi sur les langues officielles) is a Canadian law that came into force on September 9, 1969, which gives French and English equal status in the government of Canada. This makes them "official" languages, having preferred status in law over all other languages. Although the Official Languages Act is not the only piece of federal language law, it is the legislative keystone of Canada's official bilingualism. It was substantially amended in 1988. Both languages are equal in Canada's government and in all the services it controls, such as the courts.

== Summary of main features ==
The Act provides, among other things,

- that Canadians have the right to receive services from federal departments and from Crown corporations in both official languages;
- that Canadians will be able to be heard before federal courts in the official language of their choice;
- that Parliament will adopt laws and to publish regulations in both official languages, and that both versions will be of equal legal weight;
- that English and French will have equal status of languages of work within the federal public service within geographically defined parts of the country that are designated bilingual (most notably in the National Capital Region, Montreal and New Brunswick), as well as in certain overseas government offices and in parts of the country where there is sufficient demand for services in both official languages. In remaining geographical areas, the language of work for federal public servants is French (in Quebec) and English (elsewhere);

The Federal government has set in place regulations establishing linguistic categories (anglophone, francophone, bilingual) for some job functions within the public service. Departments and agencies of the federal government are required to fill these positions with individuals who are capable of serving the public in English, in French, or in both languages. Unilingual public servants are given incentives to learn the other official language, and the government provides language training and offers a "bilingualism bonus".

Part VI of the Act mandates that English-speaking Canadians and French-speaking Canadians not be discriminated against based on ethnic origin or first language learned when it comes to employment opportunities and advancement.

The law also created the Commissioner of Official Languages, an officer of Parliament charged with receiving complaints from the public, undertaking inquiries, and making recommendations regarding the status of the two official languages.

Section 32 of the Official Languages Act authorizes the Governor in Council (i.e., the federal cabinet) to issue regulations defining the geographic regions in which services will be offered by the federal government in the relevant minority language (English in Quebec and French elsewhere). This provides a legal definition for the otherwise vague requirement that services be provided in the minority official languages wherever there is "significant demand." The definition used in the regulations is complex, but basically an area of the country is served in both languages if at least 5,000 persons in that area, or 5% of the local population (whichever is smaller), belongs to that province's English or French linguistic minority population. The regulations were first promulgated in 1991.

== Political context ==
The Official Languages Act was one of the cornerstones of the government of Pierre Trudeau. The law was an attempt to implement some of the policy objectives outlined by the federally commissioned Royal Commission on Bilingualism and Biculturalism, which had been established in 1963 and since that time had been issuing periodic reports on the inequitable manner in which Canada's English-speaking and French-speaking populations were treated by the federal administration. At that time, only 9% of jobs within the federal public service were occupied by Francophones, even though French-speakers formed a quarter of the Canadian population. The proportion of jobs designated bilingual grew to 14% in 1978, and to 25% in 2004.

One of the most important features of the 1969 act was to ensure that federal government services would be provided in both official languages, wherever population size warranted it.

Its principles were later incorporated into the Constitution of Canada, in Section 16 of the Canadian Charter of Rights and Freedoms.

A new Official Languages Act was enacted in 1988 in order to achieve two objectives.

First, it was necessary to update the 1969 law to take into account the new language-related obligations that the federal government had undertaken under Sections 16-23 of the Charter of Rights and Freedoms, which had been enacted in 1982. For example, Section 20 of the Charter of Rights and Freedoms guarantees the right of the Canadian public to communicate in English and French with any central government office or with regional offices where there is "a significant demand for communication with and services from that office." Significant demand is not defined in the Charter of Rights and Freedoms. One of the purposes of the Official Languages Act of 1988 was to remedy this omission.

Second, the new law included provisions for the promotion by the government of Canada of Quebec's English-speaking minority and of the French-speaking minorities in the rest of the country. The programs that fall under the "promotion" umbrella are often designed to encourage each provincial government to offer services to its official-language minority community, and contain a mechanism for transferring funds to the provincial governments in order to finance a part of these programs. Under Canada's federal constitution, many important services, such as education and health, fall under provincial jurisdiction and are therefore off-limits to any direct federal spending. The transfer of federal funds, conditional upon the fulfilment by each provincial government of detailed conditions laid out in a funding agreement, is a constitutionally permitted method of dodging this jurisdictional constraint.

This would suggest that the Official Languages Act and Quebec's Charter of the French Language (also known as "Bill 101") are fundamentally at cross-purposes with each other. However, that perspective is not universally accepted. For example, former Liberal leader Michael Ignatieff has stated that "Bill 101 and the Official Languages Act are not in opposition, they are complementary."

== Reactions ==
=== Provincial legislatures ===
In 1969, the law was adopted with all-party support in the House of Commons of Canada. Despite this, there was not universal support for the law. The premiers of the three Prairie provinces requested, early in 1969, that the Official Languages Bill be referred to the Supreme Court of Canada to determine its constitutionality. They maintained, along with JT Thorson, the former president of the Exchequer Court of Canada, that the bill was outside the powers of the Parliament of Canada. The reference to the court was never made, but the legal question was resolved in 1974, when the Supreme Court ruled, in Jones v. Attorney General of New Brunswick, that the subject matter of the bill was within federal jurisdiction.

In subsequent decades the response from provincial governments to the example set by the federal government has been mixed:

- New Brunswick, which is home to Canada's second-largest French-speaking minority population, adopted the federal government policy and adopted its own Official Languages Act on April 18, 1969. The bilingual status of New Brunswick was strengthened in 1993 by the addition of section 16.1 to the Canadian Charter of Rights and Freedoms.
- Ontario, which is the home to Canada's largest French-speaking minority, opted instead to enact a law (the French Language Services Act) which provides for services of the provincial government to be made available in certain geographically designated regions, but which does not give the French language either a symbolic or an authoritative status as an equal "official" language of Ontario. However, the English and French versions of statutes and regulations that are enacted or made in both languages are equally authoritative.
- Manitoba, which is home to Canada's third-largest French-speaking minority, refused to overturn its ban on the use of French in both the provincial legislature and its courts (which had been in effect since 1890), until it was forced to do so in 1985 by a ruling by the Supreme Court of Canada (Reference re Manitoba Language Rights) that the province was under a constitutional obligation to enact laws in French as well as in English.
- Quebec, which is home to an English-speaking minority of over half a million, had traditionally been the only province which was generous in its treatment of its minority-language population, and for this reason had been cited by the Royal Commission on Bilingualism and Biculturalism as the model to be emulated by other provinces. But in the 1970s, the provincial legislature adopted two laws, the Official Language Act (also known as "Bill 22") and the Charter of the French Language (also known as "Bill 101"), reducing the access of Quebecers to English-language services, preventing immigrants and Francophones from enrolling their children in English schools, requiring that French be made the language of the workplace, and restricting the use of English on commercial signs.

=== Public reactions ===
Public support for bilingual services had dramatically increased between the mid-1960s and the end of the 1970s. There was no direct polling on the popularity of the Official Languages Act itself at the time, but poll data on related questions gives an indication of a significant shift in the attitudes of English-speaking Canadians. A 1965 poll showed that 17% of Canadians living outside Quebec favored the use of public funds to finance French-language schools. This proportion had risen to 77% by 1977 (albeit in response to a slightly different question about support for provincial governments offering services in French "where possible").

Within Quebec, changes to the treatment of French-speakers within the federal public service were met with approval mixed with skepticism that this actually helped the unilingual French-speaking majority of Quebecers, who continued to be excluded from all federal jobs designated "bilingual", since by definition a "bilingual" job requires the use of English.

However, the changes found some opposition in English Canada. Toronto Telegram columnist Braithwaither sums up the position of the opponents of the bill like this: "We are not afraid of any aspect of the language bill, we simply regard it as unnecessary, politically-motivated, costly to implement, divisive, and, as it affects the non-English, non-French third of the population, wholly discriminatory."

As per the bill, some positions in the public sector were designated as bilingual. At the implementation of the bill, if a bilingual position was held by a unilingual anglophone, this person was allowed to keep their position on the condition that they attempted to learn French, and all subsequent holders of this position must be bilingual. Under these circumstances, there were fears that, because of the higher rate of bilingualism among Francophones, people whose first official language is French would become overrepresented in the public sector. However, this has not become the case. The ratio of French first official language speakers to English first official language speakers in the public sector is almost the same as in the general population.

At any rate, the adoption of official bilingualism at the federal level did almost nothing to slow the rise of the sovereignist movement. The nationalist Parti Québécois made its first significant electoral breakthrough less than a year after the Official Languages Act was adopted, winning 23% of the vote in Quebec's 1970 provincial election and replacing the Union Nationale as the main electoral vehicle for Quebec nationalism. Six years later, the Parti Québécois came to power in the 1976 provincial election.

== Failure to implement all provisions of the Official Languages Act ==
From time to time, the Official Languages Commissioner draws attention to the fact that federal agencies subject to the law are failing to live up to their legal obligations regarding official languages. In a report published in 2004 on the 35th anniversary of the Official Languages Act, Commissioner Dyane Adam noted that only 86% of posts designated "bilingual" in the federal public service were occupied by persons who had effectively mastered the two official languages. This nevertheless was an increase over the comparable figure of 1978, when only 70% of the incumbents in posts that had been designated "bilingual" were capable of speaking both languages at accepted levels.

== Opinion polls ==
According to a poll conducted in 2002, 98% of Quebecers consider official bilingualism to be "very important" or "somewhat important". This proportion drops to 76% in the Atlantic provinces, 72% in Ontario, 67% in the Prairie provinces, and 63% in British Columbia. Another poll, conducted in 2000, shows that more than half of Canadians outside Quebec believe that too much effort has gone into promoting bilingualism. By contrast, only 26% of Quebecers shared this view. A poll conducted in 2012 found that 63% of Canadians were in favour of bilingualism for all of Canada, a 9% increase since that same poll was last conducted in 2003.

In 2016, another poll was conducted, showing increasing support for official bilingualism in every province. Among telephone respondents, 88% of Canadians said they "strongly support" or "somewhat support" the aims of the Official Languages Act: 91% in the Atlantic, 94% in Quebec, 87% in Ontario, 83% in the Prairies, 90% in Alberta and 84% in British Columbia. 84% of telephone respondents also said they personally "strongly support" or "somewhat support" official bilingualism. The results were more mixed in the online portion of the poll, where 78% of respondents said they "strongly support" or "somewhat support" the aims of the Official Languages Act, and 73% said they personally "strongly support" or "somewhat support" official bilingualism. In another poll conducted on this topic in the same year, 67% of respondents across Canada answered "yes" to the question "Are you personally in favour of bilingualism for all of Canada?" while 31% said "no".

== Reform proposals ==
=== 2021 OLA modernisation bill ===
In June 2021 the Government of Canada introduced a parliamentary bill to modernize the Official Languages Act in a changing and more digital society.

=== Bill C-13 ===
In 2022, the Government of Canada tabled Bill C-13 which amends the Official Languages Act and other related legislation. As of June 15, 2023, Bill C-13 passed third reading in the Senate and is awaiting royal assent.

=== Including more languages ===
The Official Languages Act applies to English and French, but does not include formal protections any other languages spoken in Canada, Indigenous or otherwise. In a Winnipeg allocution during his first term, Pierre Elliott Trudeau said that French was selected as an official language mostly because of the important demographic weight within Canada. As such, if and when Ukrainian would represent the mother tongue of, say, 10% of the population, Trudeau assured the crowd that steps would be taken to make Ukrainian an official language of Canada as well.

More recently, Romeo Saganash, the NDP Member of Parliament for Abitibi—Baie-James—Nunavik—Eeyou from 2011 to 2019, proposed that every single indigenous languages still spoken today become an official language of Canada. Saganash also advocates for the right to speak indigenous languages in the House of Commons and the Senate.

== See also ==
- Official bilingualism in Canada
- Official bilingualism in the public service of Canada
- Official Language Act (Quebec)
- Charter of the French Language
- Royal Commission on Bilingualism and Biculturalism
- Languages of Canada
- Office of the Commissioner of Official Languages (includes list of commissioners 1970–present)
- List of acts of the Parliament of Canada
