= Section 16 of the Canadian Charter of Rights and Freedoms =

Official bilingualism in Canada

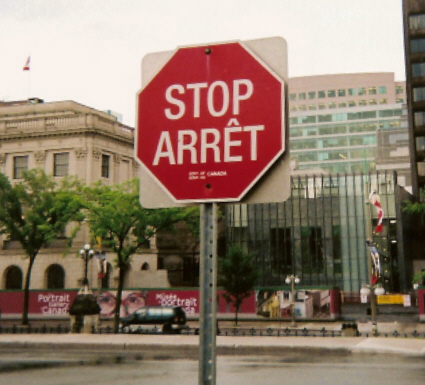
A bilingual (English and French) stop sign on Parliament Hill in Ottawa. An example of bilingualism at the federal government level.

Section 16 of the Canadian Charter of Rights and Freedoms is the first of several sections of the Constitution dealing with Canada's two official languages, English and French. Section 16 declares that English and French are the official languages of Canada and of the province of New Brunswick.

== Text ==
Under the heading "Official Languages of Canada", the section reads:

16. (1) English and French are the official languages of Canada and have the equality of status and equal rights and privileges as to their use in all institutions of the Parliament and government of Canada.

(2) English and French are the official languages of New Brunswick and have equality of status and equal rights and privileges as to their use in all institutions of the legislature and government of New Brunswick.

(3) Nothing in this Charter limits the authority of Parliament or a legislature to advance the equality of status or use of English and French.

== Function ==
This section sets out general principles that are expanded in sections 16.1 to 22. Section 16 itself expands upon language rights in the Constitution Act, 1867; whereas section 133 of the Constitution Act, 1867 merely allowed for both languages to be used in the Parliament of Canada and in the Quebec legislature, and in some courts, section 16 goes further by allowing bilingualism in the federal and New Brunswick bureaucracies, and in the New Brunswick legislature. This was not entirely new, as Canada's Official Languages Act had provided for this at the federal level since 1969, and New Brunswick had similar legislation. Those laws, however, were merely statutes, and section 16 thus made some of their key aspects into constitutional principles.

== Judicial interpretation ==
=== Subsections 16(1) and 16(2) ===
It has not been easy to understand how section 16 can be applied. In Société des Acadiens v. Association of Parents (1986), Chief Justice Brian Dickson made reference to the "academic debate about the precise significance of s. 16," and the question of "Whether s. 16 is visionary, declaratory or substantive in nature." He did, however, decide that "at the very least it provides a strong indicator of the purpose of the language guarantees in the Charter [ie., sections 17 to 22]... the federal government of Canada and the government of New Brunswick have demonstrated their commitment to official bilingualism within their respective jurisdictions."

In the same case, Justice Jean Beetz wrote that the political nature of section 16, as opposed to the generous nature of the rights in the rest of the Charter, indicate that courts should be cautious in interpreting section 16 in new ways. Elected governments would play a larger role in determining its scope. Justice Bertha Wilson went on to speculate that section 16 is meant to represent an opportunity for expansion of language rights. Thus, courts must always ask themselves how their rulings fit in with the current state of affairs regarding official languages policy, and how their rulings are consistent with it. While the rights guaranteed under another language provision of the Charter, section 20, are limited, this does not mean that section 16 is limited or cannot have an effect on the growth of language rights. As far as New Brunswick is concerned, she added, bilingualism was considered "crucial" to "social and cultural development," and thus there should be "heightened public expectations" that this could be supported by the Charter.

In R. v. Beaulac (1999), the Supreme Court rejected some of its earlier conservative interpretations. It ruled that a purposive (generous) interpretation would be appropriate for language rights, since this would help minority language communities (i.e. those who speak English or French in a region where that language is the minority language) achieve equality.

Many Charter cases regarding the use of the English and French languages have not been fought on the grounds of section 16. For example, Quebec's Bill 101, which limited the use of English, was considered to be invalid in certain respects not because it conflicted with section 16, but because it infringed freedom of expression, which is guaranteed by section 2 of the Charter.

Likewise, section 16 does not really apply to provinces besides New Brunswick; as the only province that currently considers itself to be officially bilingual, New Brunswick is the only province to have its bilingualism guaranteed by section 16. When Manitoba's laws declaring English to be the only official language of the province were found to be invalid in Re Manitoba Language Rights (1985), this was due to its contradictions with the Manitoba Act.

=== Subsection 16(3) ===
Subsection 16(3) provides that a Parliament or provincial government may strive for progress in official bilingualism. This reflects a 1975 court decision, Jones v. Attorney General of New Brunswick, in which it was found governments may do this. Thus, the Supreme Court in Société des Acadiens has argued that it is the elected governments and "political compromise", rather than the courts, that will mostly advance language rights.

Justice Wilson added that subsection 16(3) demonstrates that while language rights need to be improved, they should not be eroded once they have been established.

== See also ==
- Official bilingualism in Canada
- Royal Commission on Bilingualism and Biculturalism
