= R v Beaulac =

- Supreme Court of Canada

Hearing: February 24, 1999 Judgment: May 20, 1999
- Full case name: Jean Victor Beaulac v. Her Majesty The Queen
- Citations: [1999] 1 S.C.R. 768
- Docket No.: 26416
- Prior history: Judgment for the Crown in the Court of Appeal for British Columbia.
- Ruling: Appeal allowed.

Holding
- Language rights in the Constitution of Canada and section 530 of the Criminal Code are to be given a purposive and liberal interpretation.

Court membership
- Chief Justice: Antonio Lamer; Puisne Justices: Claire L'Heureux-Dubé, Charles Gonthier, Peter Cory, Beverley McLachlin, Frank Iacobucci, John C. Major, Michel Bastarache, Ian Binnie

Reasons given
- Majority: Bastarache J., joined by L’Heureux-Dubé, Gonthier, Cory, McLachlin, Iacobucci, and Major JJ.
- Concurrence: Lamer C.J. and Binnie J.

R v Beaulac [1999] 1 S.C.R. 768 is a decision by the Supreme Court of Canada on language rights. Notably, the majority adopted a liberal and purposive interpretation of language rights in the Canadian Charter of Rights and Freedoms, overturning conservative case law such as Société des Acadiens v. Association of Parents (1986). As the majority wrote, "To the extent that Société des Acadiens du Nouveau-Brunswick... stands for a restrictive interpretation of language rights, it is to be rejected."

== Background ==
Jean Victor Beaulac was accused of murder and was brought before the British Columbia Supreme Court and convicted. Beaulac claimed rights under section 530 of the Criminal Code, which allows for the accused to be heard in court in his or her language, if it is one of the official languages of Canada, English or French. The Supreme Court noted in its 1999 decision that this was the first time it had ever considered this Criminal Code right. At a lower level, Beaulac had been denied this right to be heard in French, since one judge found Beaulac's skills in English were adequate though not perfect.

== Decision ==
The majority of the Court first considered the Constitution of Canada, noting that the Constitution Act, 1867, which set out the rules for Canadian federalism, did not give any level of government exclusive jurisdiction to create language rights, and both levels probably could. There were language rights in the Constitution as well, and these could provide context for language rights cases. These include section 133 of the Constitution Act, 1867, and it was noted that in Jones v. Attorney General of New Brunswick (1975) the Supreme Court found that these can be expanded upon. The majority noted that in 1986 the Supreme Court found that language rights should be handled conservatively, in MacDonald v. City of Montreal, Société des Acadiens and Bilodeau v. Attorney General of Manitoba. However, the majority claimed conservative interpretation of language rights has since given way to a more liberal approach, in Ford v. Quebec (Attorney General) (1988), which concerned language and freedom of expression under section 2 of the Canadian Charter. The Court took this as important, since this "re-affirm[s] the importance of language rights as supporting official language communities and their culture." Other noted victories for language rights included Mahe v. Alberta (1990) on minority language education rights in section 23 of the Canadian Charter and Reference re Manitoba Language Rights (1992) on the Manitoba Act. While in Société des Acadiens the Court had played down language rights because they were deemed to be the result of political deals, in this case the Court decided that it does not follow that that means the courts cannot interpret the rights in the same way it interprets other rights. Hence, the Court saw language rights as individual rights promoting dignity, and the Criminal Code right represented a growth in language rights encouraged by section 16 of the Canadian Charter.

Turning to section 530 of the Criminal Code, the Court called it an "absolute right." Since past interpretation indicated such rights are not just due process, it should be respected beyond what the letter of the law actually demands. The Court also found that the accused's language was a personal matter and related to one's identity, and therefore courts should respect the accused's "subjective" feelings towards a language. In this case, the Court ordered a new trial.

== Concurrence ==
Chief Justice Antonio Lamer and Ian Binnie wrote a brief concurrence on section 530 of the Criminal Code. However, they protested the reconsideration of Société des Acadiens and section 16 of the Charter since the Beaulac case did not involve constitutional law. "It is a well-established rule of prudence that courts ought not to pronounce on constitutional issues unless they are squarely raised for decision," they wrote.
