= Official bilingualism in the public service of Canada =

Because Canada has, for over two centuries, contained both English- and French-speakers, the question of the language used in the administration of public affairs has always been a sensitive issue.

Among the aspect of this issue that have excited public attention from time to time are:

- the perception of fairness or unfairness in hiring and promoting speakers of one official language over speakers of the other;
- the choice of one language over the other for meetings, documents, and internal memoranda (which are sometimes collectively characterized as the work "environment");
- the promotion of bilingual job candidates over people who only speak only one or the other of the two official languages;
- the availability (or lack of availability) of language training for public servants, who cannot advance without the ability to speak both languages;
- the costs associated with language-based hiring and promotion practices, including the practice of paying a "bilingual bonus" to public servants capable of speaking both official languages;
- the need to provide government services to some Canadians in English, and to others in French.

== Ratio of native English-speakers to native French-speakers ==
The issue of proportional hiring and promotion of speakers of both official languages has been an issue in Canadian politics since before Confederation. Members of each linguistic group have, at different times in the country's history, complained of injustice when their group have been represented, in public service hiring and promotion, in numbers less than would be justified by their proportion of the national population.

For the greater part of Canada's history, French-speakers were underrepresented, and English-speakers were overrepresented in the ranks of the public service. This disproportion became more pronounced in the more senior ranks of the Public Service. However, this trend has reversed itself in recent decades. Today, French is the first official language of 23% of Canada's population, with 29.2% of Public Service of Canada employees identifying French as their first official language, including 32% of management-level jobs.

The first high-profile complaint of preferential hiring took place in 1834. One of the Ninety-Two Resolutions of the Lower Canadian House of Assembly drew attention to the fact that French Canadians, who at the time were 88% of the colony's population, held only 30% of the posts in the 157-member colonial civil service. Moreover, the resolution stated, French Canadians were, "for the most part, appointed to the inferior and less lucrative offices, and most frequently only obtaining even them, by becoming the dependent of those [British immigrants] who hold the higher and the more lucrative offices...."

With the advent of responsible government in the 1840s, the power to make civil service appointments was transferred to elected politicians, who had a strong incentive to ensure that French Canadian voters did not feel that they were being frozen out of hiring and promotions. Although no formal reform of the hiring and promotion process was ever undertaken, the patronage-driven hiring process seems to have produced a more equitable representation of the two language groups. In 1863, the public service of the united Province of Canada (which included both of the former colonies of Lower Canada and Upper Canada) had grown to include 450 officials at its administrative headquarters. Of these, 161 persons, or about 36%, were French Canadians. However, French-speaking civil servants accounted for only 20% of the total payroll, suggesting that they were mainly confined to the lower ranks of the colonial administration.

In the period between 1867 and the turn of the 20th century, French-Canadians made up about one-third of the Canadian population, and seem also to have represented about one-third of civil service appointments at junior levels, although they had only about half that much representation at most senior level. In general, it seems to have been the case that throughout the entire period between Confederation and the introduction of merit-based hiring and promotion in 1919, the percentage of French-speakers in the civil service relatively closely matched their percentage of the Canadian population because French-Canadians occupied a more-or-less proportionate share of cabinet posts, and they appointed public servants who were personally loyal to them. This so-called "spoils system" ensured a rough equity between members of the two language groups. A quarter-century after this system had been abolished, it was summarized as follows in a submission to the 1946 Royal Commission on Administrative Classifications in the Civil Service:

Before 1919, positions in the bureaucracy were distributed, in large measure, under a patronage system (spoils system) even though some efforts at reform had been put in place and had introduced a degree of permanence in head offices. French-speaking statesmen, just like their [English-speaking] colleagues, were therefore able to obtain their share of the patronage. General administration was not very complicated in those days and ministers could personally take charge of administering the internal organization of their respective departments, as it was possible to personally know every one of their employees.

In 1918, just before the reforms began, the percentage of francophones in the federal civil service stood at just under 22%. The drop in the percentage of French-speakers was in part due to the fact that the proportion of Canadians who were French-speaking was gradually declining; in the 1921 census, persons of French origin were down to 27.9% of the population. As well, the Unionist government then in power had almost no representation in Quebec, which meant that for several years there were no French-Canadian ministers appointing and promoting their fellow French-speakers.

The percentage of French-speakers would, however, drop much further as a result of the replacement of a patronage-based appointment system with a merit-based system that was largely based upon the ability to perform efficiently in English. By 1946, according to figures presented in the House of Commons, native speakers of French had declined to only 13% of public service posts. At the time, French-speakers represented slightly under 30% of the Canadian population. This seems to have represented the low point, in terms of inequitably low representation for Francophones within the Public Service; by 1964, French-speakers had risen to 21.5% of the Public Service (which itself had grown to 137,000 officials, meaning that 29,500 French-speakers were employed by the federal government). Although this represented a substantial improvement, French-speakers at this time represented about 28% of Canada's population, and therefore continued to be underrepresented. Moreover, French-Canadians continued to be grouped at the bottom of the seniority scale: They represented 23.7% of junior employees earning less than $4,000 per year, but only 10.4% of senior officials with earnings in the highest category (over $15,000).

By the early 1960s, the issue of Canada's seemingly perpetual inability to create an equitable distribution of jobs in the country's rapidly expanding public service was becoming a key grievance underlying Quebec nationalism. In 1961, a Royal Commission studying the structure of the federal bureaucracy organized a special committee to study the issue of bilingualism within the Public Service. The Commission's 1962 report included recommendations that the federal government “adopt active measures to develop bilingual capacities among its employees on a selective basis,” and that it more actively recruit qualified French Canadians who would have the potential to advance to the senior ranks of the federal administration.

In part on the basis of this recommendation, the government of Prime Minister Lester B. Pearson established a Royal Commission on Bilingualism and Biculturalism, which made language reform within the public service one of its highest priorities. Book III of the Royal Commission's multi-volume report, published in 1969, recommended a radical redesign of the Public Service of Canada, in order to establish full equality between the two official languages in the federal administration, and a permanently equitable distribution of jobs, at all levels of seniority, between French-speaking and English-speaking Canadians.

=== Recent increase in ratio of native French-speakers ===
Since the report of the Royal Commission in 1969, the percentage of Francophones in the public service of Canada has increased, and the percentage of Anglophones has decreased.

When looking at public service positions in various regions of the country, the same trend has occurred; however it is much less pronounced outside of the national capital region surrounding Ottawa, Ontario and Gatineau, Quebec.

Representation of Anglophones and Francophones in the public service of Canada by year
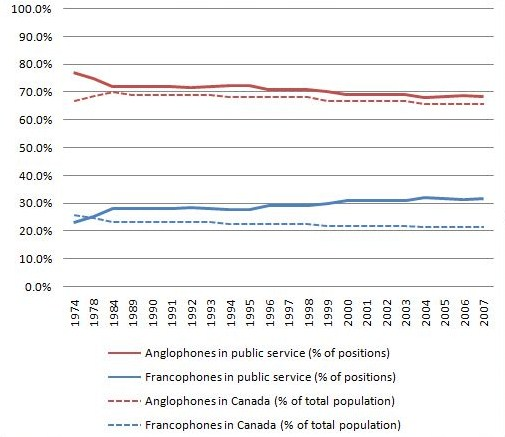
Canada

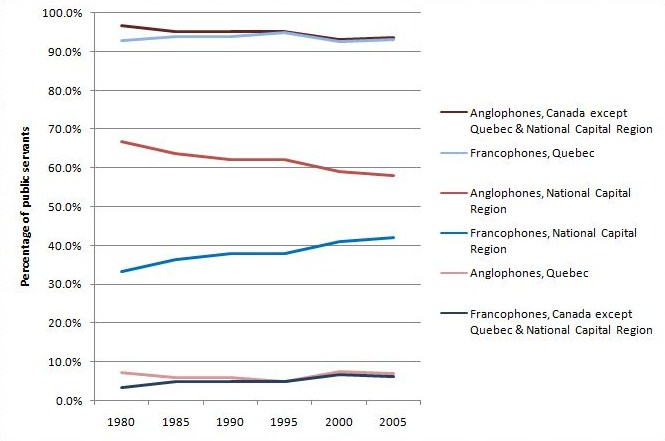
Anglophones and Francophones in the public service of Canada by region

=== Increased Francophone representation in management positions ===
Francophone representation in management positions in the Public Service has increased from 10.4% in 1964 to 18% in 1978 and to 30% in 2007. Francophones are now overrepresented in all Public service categories, however the degree to which this representation has occurred varies by occupation.

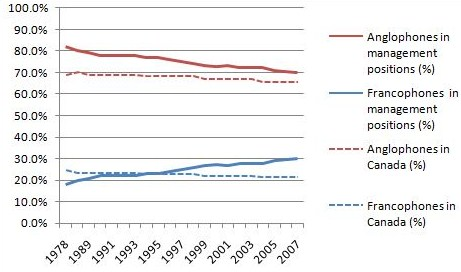
Representation of Francophones and Anglophones in management positions in the public service of Canada 1978-2007

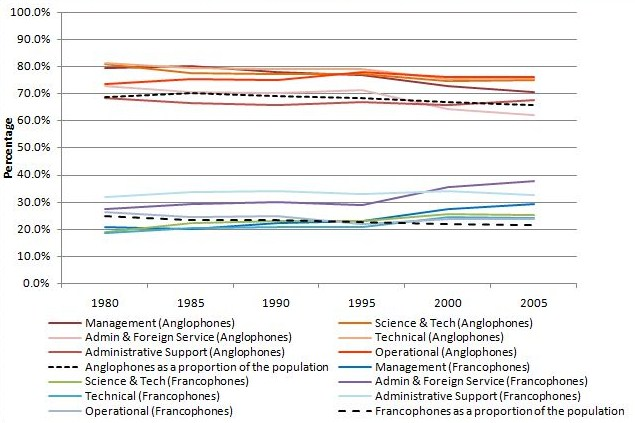
Representation of Francophones and Anglophones in various positions in the public service of Canada 1980-2005

=== Increased number of ‘bilingual imperative’ positions ===
Positions in the public service are classified in four ways, depending on the required linguistic capacity of the candidate for the position: bilingual imperative, English essential, French essential or either French or English essential. The bilingual imperative category is further broken down into the level of both languages the candidate is required to speak. Since 1989 there has been a sharp increase in the number of positions classified as ‘bilingual imperative’ and a sharp decrease in the number of positions open to unilingual Canadians.

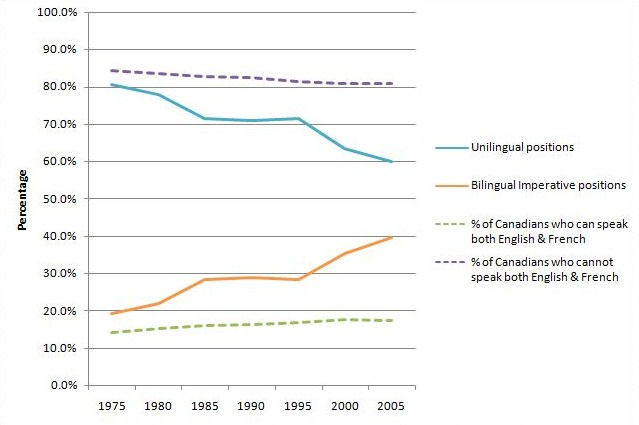
Job classifications in the public service of Canada

== Current situation ==
Today, the built-in barriers to the hiring and promotion of francophones have been overcome. French-speakers ceased to be underrepresented in the Public Service in 1978, and the percentage of public servants who are francophones has been growing steadily ever since. At the management level, French-speakers ceased to be under-represented in 1995. There is now a growing over-representation of persons with French as their first official language in the Public Service. In 2007, francophones occupied 31.5% of positions in the core public administration, and 26.9% in institutions subject to the Official Languages Act, overall. Bilingualism is desirable for politicians; John Turner's fluency in both English and French, for example, helped him become leader of the Liberal Party and Prime Minister in 1984.

In 2007, positions in the core public administration broke down as follows:

"Bilingual" - 40.2% "English Essential" - 51.2% "French Essential" - 4.0% "English or French Essential" - 4.4%

In his 2008-09 annual report, the Commissioner for Official Languages wrote, "A vast majority of federal institutions have yet to create a workplace where their employees feel comfortable using either official language and are encouraged to do so." He identified the following problem areas:

- "French is not used as much as it should be as a language of work in federal offices located in the National Capital Region and outside Quebec."
- "French does not have its rightful place in communications between the federal government’s head offices and its regional offices in Quebec."
- "English remains underused as a language of work in the Quebec offices of federal institutions."

A lack of language proficiency on the part of some managers may contribute to the situation. The Commissioner wrote in his report: "Some managers hinder the use of the minority language, either because they are not proficient enough in the language or because they hesitate to use it. Similarly, Francophones fearing that their professional contribution will not be fully recognized tend to work in English when their superiors do not use French daily and do not stress the importance of using it."

== See also ==
- Official bilingualism in Canada
- Official Languages Act (Canada)
- Public Service of Canada
- Royal Commission on Bilingualism and Biculturalism
- Languages of Canada
- Timeline of official languages policy in Canada
