= Section 20 of the Canadian Charter of Rights and Freedoms =

Constitutional right to receive government services in English or French

Section 20 of the Canadian Charter of Rights and Freedoms is one of the sections of the Constitution of Canada dealing with Canada's two official languages, English and French. Along with section 16, section 20 is one of the few sections under the title "Official Languages of Canada" that guarantees bilingualism outside Parliament, legislatures and courts. This also makes it more extensive than language rights in the Constitution Act, 1867. Section 20's specific function is to establish a right to English and French services from the governments of Canada and New Brunswick.

== Text ==
Section 20 reads:

20.(1) Any member of the public in Canada has the right to communicate with, and to receive available services from, any head or central office of an institution of the Parliament or government of Canada in English or French, and has the same right with respect to any other office of any such institution where

(a) there is a significant demand for communications with and services from that office in such language; or

(b) due to the nature of the office, it is reasonable that communications with and services from that office be available in both English and French.

(2) Any member of the public in New Brunswick has the right to communicate with, and to receive available services from, any office of an institution of the legislature or government of New Brunswick in English or French.

== Rights and limitations ==
Section 20 applies to services from offices of Parliament and the government of Canada, including government departments and the bureaucracy. According to some judicial decisions, it also applies to services from police departments and the Royal Canadian Mounted Police, although not all police officers need to be bilingual. The section's requirements are fully applicable to the main of these offices on the federal level. Section 20 limits its rights only when dealing with the lower-level offices, where there must be considerable interest for services in both languages, or if the offices are filling a function that one would expect should be carried out in both languages.

As section 20 applies to offices besides Parliament and the courts, it is more extensive than sections 17-22 of the Charter and language rights in section 133 of the Constitution Act, 1867. As far as the text is concerned, these rights are even more extensive in respect to the government of New Brunswick, where there are no requirements for considerable interest for the right to exist.

As constitutional scholar Peter Hogg notes, other provinces are not required to provide bilingual services under section 20, but some choose to do so under provincial legislation.

== Judicial interpretation ==
In the Supreme Court of Canada case Société des Acadiens v. Association of Parents (1986), Justice Bertha Wilson remarked that the limited rights in section 20 seemed to contrast with section 16, which encourages growth in government bilingualism. However, she speculated Parliament could use section 16 to heighten expectations for bilingualism in section 20, by giving the requirement for considerable interest in bilingualism a flexible interpretation. Wilson did, however, write that courts could not employ this flexible interpretation.

The requirement for considerable interest was interpreted in Saulnier v. The Queen, (1989), in which it was found that the Department of Fisheries violated section 20 by providing English-only services, (1) by simply presuming there was no need for French services, (2) because there were penal consequences for anyone who disobeyed the law not provided in French, and (3) even though some French Canadians understood English, French was still their first language. In Professional Institute of the Public Service v. The Queen (1993), it was added that relevant factors for requiring bilingualism should include the number of people in a minority language community, interest among the population, and relations between the people and the government. Statistics and the practices of the office might be of use in measuring these things.

In R. v. Haché, (1993), it was found the government is not under any obligation to tell people that they have rights under section 20.

== Public views ==
In 1989, a few political scientists published a survey on the public's opinion on section 20. It indicated that French Canadians strongly support French services outside Quebec and in almost equal measure support the same rights for English Quebec. Ninety-seven percent of English Canadians support the right for English Quebeckers, and 65% of English Canadians supported the rights of French Canadians under section 20.
