= Section 22 of the Canadian Charter of Rights and Freedoms =

Non-derogation of rights concerning other languages

Section 22 of the Canadian Charter of Rights and Freedoms is one of several sections of the Charter relating to the official languages of Canada. The official languages, under section 16, are English and French. Section 22 is specifically concerned with political rights relating to languages besides English and French.

== Text ==
It reads,

22. Nothing in sections 16 to 20 abrogates or derogates from any legal or customary right or privilege acquired or enjoyed either before or after the coming into force of this Charter with respect to any language that is not English or French.

== Function ==
Section 22 ensures that political rights regarding the use of other languages besides English and French are not limited by the fact that English and French are the only languages recognized as being official by the other provisions of the Charter. The political rights regarding other languages may exist by virtue of statute or simply custom, and the rights may predate the Charter or may be created after its enactment in 1982. As author Walter Tarnopolsky noted in 1982, the Aboriginal peoples in Canada were the most likely people, and perhaps the only people, to have customary language rights. The section may allow other languages to become official languages in the future, and demonstrates that having constitutional law regarding languages does not mean the law is fixed forever.

That same year, Professor André Tremblay wrote that section 22 would apply to "government services." He also points out that the Charter offers no assurances that these language rights "will be provided indefinitely." If those rights are not constitutionalized, the government in question can presumably abolish them at any time.

Professor Leslie Green has argued that section 22 also justifies the English and French language rights. The rights regarding English and French in the Charter are special rights, which raises the question of whether such rights can be justified in a democracy. However, Green writes that the special rights can be justified if this "leaves speakers of other languages no worse off than they would have been" if the special rights for English and French did not exist. Green points to section 22 as evidence that other languages are not harmed by the rights regarding English and French. Indeed, the fact that the Charter allows for English and French to be used in the government does not harm other languages, because the numbers of English and French Canadians mean that those languages would be used in the government anyway. Still, Green acknowledged that "tolerance" of languages besides English and French could be improved. Justice Bastarache and fellow-experts also relate section 22 to upholding Canadian multiculturalism.

== Education rights ==
In 1982, Walter Tarnopolsky speculated that section 22, combined with section 27 of the Charter, which provides for a multicultural framework for Charter rights, could lead to the creation of new minority language education rights based on those in section 23 of the Charter, but for language groups besides the English and French-speaking populations. However, Tarnopolsky acknowledged that if any such rights are created, it would probably be done by elected governments, and not by the courts.

== Parliament ==
Writing in 1982, constitutional scholar Peter Hogg remarked that section 22 would apply to rights in a "particular area." Indeed, the governments of the Yukon, the Northwest Territories and Nunavut allow Aboriginal languages to be spoken in their legislatures.

However, debates regarding the use of different languages in the Parliament of Canada have involved discussion of section 22. In June 2005, a committee of Senators discussed whether speaking Inuktitut, an Inuit language, in Parliament would be constitutional. Concerns were raised about section 133 of the Constitution Act, 1867 and sections 16 and 17 of the Charter, and how these sections only recognize English and French as the languages of Parliament. It was in turn argued section 22 was "relevant" to this debate, and that this section stated that the other Charter rights could not diminish rights regarding Inuktitut. Senator Serge Joyal, in expressing concern that "12 Aboriginal languages will have disappeared" in the year 2020 "because people are not using them," argued that section 22 provided "a foundation in the Constitution" for a "principle" that could be invoked to guard against this. This senator argued that aboriginal languages, by custom, should have rights as to their usage.
