= New Brunswick Association of English-speaking Canadians =

The New Brunswick Association of English-speaking Canadians was formed in 1984 at the instigation of Len Poore, to oppose the flying of the Acadian flag on provincial government buildings on the occasion of the flag's 100th anniversary. The group focussed most of its attention thereafter on opposing the proposals of the province's Poirier-Bastarache Report, which called for a considerable expansion of bilingualism. At its peak, Poore claimed that the organization had 9,000 members.

== History ==
Len Poore asserted that the Poirier-Bastarache Report had upset the province's linguistic harmony. He stated, "This province went on so well for so long before the provincial government decided to push ahead with more bilingualism."

The negative reaction among anglophones to the Poirier-Bastarache Report, combined with a generally positive reception among the province's francophones, turned the recommendations into "such a hot potato that the government was not ready for it and, therefore, Conservative Premier Richard Hatfield used [the establishment of a set of "Advisory Committee"] hearings as a stalling device."

The recommendation that seems to have caused the greatest amount of resistance among anglophones, and therefore to have played the critical role in the transformation of Poore’s organization from its original purpose to the bilingualism issue, was the proposal that the provincial public service be made more open to francophones.

In her study on New Brunswick public opinion regarding official bilingualism, Catherine Steele writes that the conditions that made possible the rapid rise of the New Brunswick Association of English-Speaking Canadians were established by the peculiar nature of negotiations between and among the province’s political parties. She explains that “both the Liberals and Conservatives in New Brunswick avoid[ed] debating the validity or merits of bilingualism due to the fear of political repercussions,” and notes that “this clash of opinions and attitudes is the product of a failure of the political elite to employ the conflict-resolving mechanisms of depoliticization, secrecy, proportionality and consensus, used to maintain good relations or “bonne entente” between francophones and anglophones.”

There appears to have been a disjunction between the elite consensus not to discuss the bilingualism issue and the significant popular dissatisfaction with the either the status quo or the anticipated changes from the status quo which might take place in the future. She writes, “Consensus among New Brunswick’s political elites does exist in that both major parties, the Liberals and PC’s agree that bilingualism is important, the issue is an explosive one, and the political consequences too great for its merits to be politically debated. It is the risky nature of the subject that results in neither the Liberals nor the Conservatives knowing how to approach the subject or deal with the issue. Groups such as the New Brunswick Association of English-Speaking Canadians and le Parti Acadien capitalize on this consensus and lack of linguistic policy initiative by opening up a new forum for debate."

This same disjunction between a large segment of popular opinion and the positions of the political parties is a likely explanation for the collapse of Richard Hatfield’s Progressive Conservatives in the 1987 provincial election and the subsequent rise of the Confederation of Regions Party to Official Opposition status following the 1991 provincial election.

The Association was disbanded in 1986, after the Advisory Committee had conducted hearings across the province to determine the public reaction to the Poirier-Bastarache Report.
