= Section 17 of the Canadian Charter of Rights and Freedoms =

Constitutional right to use English or French in Parliament

Section 17 of the Canadian Charter of Rights and Freedoms is one of the provisions of the Charter that addresses rights relating to Canada's two official languages, English and French. While the section 17 right to use either language within the Parliament of Canada repeats a right already anchored in section 133 of the Constitution Act, 1867, section 17 also guarantees the right to use both languages in the legislature of New Brunswick, the only officially bilingual province under section 16 of the Charter.

== Text ==
Section 17 reads,

17.(1) Everyone has the right to use English or French in any debates and other proceedings of Parliament.
(2) Everyone has the right to use English or French in any debates and other proceedings of the legislature of New Brunswick.

== Application ==
As noted in the Supreme Court decision New Brunswick Broadcasting Co. v. Nova Scotia (1993), the stated application of section 17 is to "Parliament." This wording is an anomaly because technically Parliament is just an institution that enacts statutes. The rights held under section 17, in contrast, presumably are not held against the statutes of Parliament but rather apply to the debates that occur within Parliamentary institutions, such as the House of Commons of Canada and Senate of Canada.

This section, as it applies to Parliament, extends to Parliamentary committees. Witness appearing before a committee have the right to testify in either English or French. Justice Michel Bastarache and his fellow-writers agree that section 17 applies to "other activities of Parliament," including Parliamentary committees, but argue that bilingualism in Parliamentary committees had been allowed for years prior to the Charter and interpreters had been provided.

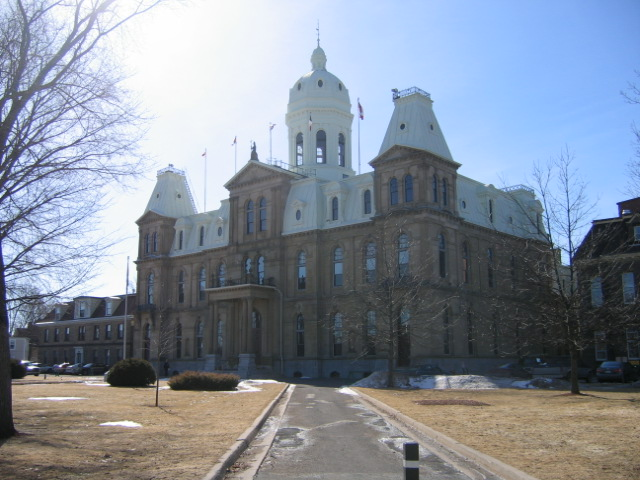
The Legislative Assembly of New Brunswick building, where members may speak English or French.

As noted, the section also extends these constitutional rights to New Brunswick. However, similar statutory rights in New Brunswick had already been in place when the Charter came to force. Namely, they were in the Official Languages of New Brunswick Act. Section 17 thus constitutionalized the rights.

== Interpretation ==
In the 1986 Supreme Court case Société des Acadiens v. Association of Parents, Justice Jean Beetz found that section 17 was so similar to section 133 of the Constitution Act, 1867 (section 17 was based on section 133) that section 17 would not represent any change in regard to rights that had belonged under section 133. Thus, section 133 case law would influence section 17 case law. Justice Bertha Wilson, commenting on section 17's parallel with section 133 of the Constitution Act, 1867, also said that it could represent mere "constitutional continuity." However, she did acknowledge that section 17 being exempt from the notwithstanding clause, and the amending formula making Canada's language rights impossible to amend without the support from all provinces as well as the federal government, reveal language rights to be "a response to the peculiar facts of Canada's history." Beetz found that in Parliament, while section 17 guarantees a right for a person to speak in either French or English, this does not extend to guaranteeing a right for the person's speech to be translated so all can understand it; the same line of reasoning had been used for section 133.

This line of thinking regarding section 133 also appeared in the Supreme Court case MacDonald v. City of Montreal (1986). In MacDonald, Jones v. Attorney General of New Brunswick (1975) was cited as finding that section 133 did not really effectively establish a sophisticated official bilingualism for Canada. While rights to bilingualism in legislative bodies might allow for some members to understand each other if they happened to know the language being used, there was no guarantee for this. Moreover, courts should interpret these rights conservatively since they are a political matter. According to MacDonald, having translators in Parliament is thus not mandatory under section 133, since there is no guarantee everyone will be able to understand an MP who speaks in either English or French. These rights are thus negative rights only. An unconstitutional action would be for Parliament or a legislature to force a person to leave for speaking in English or French.
