= Jones v New Brunswick (AG) =

Judgement of the Supreme Court of Canada

- Court: Supreme Court of Canada
- Decided: [1975] 2 S.C.R. 182
- Defendant: New Brunswick Attorney General
- Plaintiffs: Leonard Jones, Mayor of Moncton
- Citation: [1975] 2 S.C.R. 182

Case opinions
- The Official Languages Act was within the federal government's constitutional authority

Jones v New Brunswick (AG) (1974), [1975] 2 S.C.R. 182 is a leading decision of the Supreme Court of Canada on the protection of language rights under the Canadian Constitution. The Mayor of Moncton, Leonard Jones, challenged the federal Official Languages Act, which made both French and English the official languages of the institutions of the federal government. Jones argued that the subject matter of the law fell outside the constitutional jurisdiction of the federal government.

The Court upheld the constitutional validity of the Official Languages Act, finding that the subject matter of the law related to the administration of Parliamentary institutions and therefore was within the authority of the federal government under the peace, order and good government power of the Constitution Act, 1867.

In essence, the Supreme Court was ruling that "the language guarantees set forth in the Constitution represented a minimum protection and did not stop Parliament or the provincial legislatures from adopting more generous language regimes."

In its 1986 ruling in Société des Acadiens v. Association of Parents, the Supreme Court stated that the principle that elected governments can enhance language rights, had been constitutionalized in 1982 under the terms of section 16(3) of the Canadian Charter of Rights and Freedoms.

== See also ==
- List of Supreme Court of Canada cases (Laskin Court)
