= Reference Re Manitoba Language Rights =

Supreme Court of Canada language rights case

- Supreme Court of Canada

Hearing: June 11, 12, 13, 1984 Judgment: June 13, 1985
- Citations: [1985] 1 S.C.R. 721
- Docket No.: 18606

Court membership
- Chief Justice: Brian Dickson; Puisne Justices: Roland Ritchie, Jean Beetz, Willard Estey, William McIntyre, Julien Chouinard, Antonio Lamer, Bertha Wilson, Gerald Le Dain

Reasons given
- Unanimous reasons by: The Court
- Ritchie and Chouinard JJ. took no part in the consideration or decision of the case.

Reference Re Manitoba Language Rights, [1985] 1 S.C.R. 721, was a reference question posed to the Supreme Court of Canada regarding provisions in the Manitoba Act, 1870 stipulating the provision of French language services in the province of Manitoba. The Court heard the appeal in June 1984 and gave its ruling a year later, on June 13, 1985.

Four questions were asked:

1. Are sections 133 of the Constitution Act, 1867, and 23 of the Manitoba Act, 1870, requiring laws be in both French and English, mandatory in Manitoba, Quebec, and Parliament?
2. If so, are those Manitoban laws not printed in both languages invalid under section 23 of the Manitoba Act, 1870?
3. If so, do the laws have any force and effect, and if so to what extent?
4. Are any of the provisions of An Act Respecting the Operation of Section 23 of the Manitoba Act in Regard to Statutes inconsistent with section 23 of the Manitoba Act, 1870, and if so are the provisions invalid and of no legal force and effect?

The Court found that the Constitution Act, 1867, and the Manitoba Act, 1870, did require both languages and that those laws that were not in both languages were of no force and effect. However, they were deemed temporarily valid for a time until translations could be re-enacted in order to avoid a legal vacuum in Manitoba and to ensure the continuity of the rule of law.

This reference was the first time that the courts in Canada had used the remedy of a delayed declaration of invalidity. Despite its exceptional origins, this remedy has grown to become a preferred one in Canadian public law. Manitoba was given a generous period of time to translate the laws and, in 1992, the court was still extending this grace period to be decided by the parties.
