= Société des Acadiens v Association of Parents =

- Supreme Court of Canada

Hearing: December 4–5, 1984 Judgment: May 1, 1986
- Full case name: Société des Acadiens du Nouveau‑Brunswick Inc. and the Association des conseillers scolaires francophones du Nouveau‑Brunswick v Association of Parents for Fairness in Education, Grand Falls District 50 Branch
- Citations: [1986] 1 SCR 549

Court membership
- Chief Justice: Brian Dickson; Puisne Justices: Jean Beetz, Willard Estey, William McIntyre, Julien Chouinard, Antonio Lamer, Bertha Wilson, Gerald Le Dain, Gérard La Forest

Reasons given
- Majority: Beetz, joined by Estey, Chouinard, Lamer and Le Dain
- Concurrence: Dickson
- Concurrence: Wilson
- McIntyer and La Forest took no part in the consideration or decision of the case.

Laws applied
- Canadian Charter of Rights and Freedoms, ss 16, 19

Société des Acadiens v Association of Parents is a Supreme Court of Canada decision on minority language rights under section 19(2) of the Canadian Charter of Rights and Freedoms. The majority of the Court held that in civil cases in the New Brunswick courts, the parties have the right to use either French or English in all submissions and pleadings. However, they do not have a right to have the matter heard by a judge who understands them in the language they choose to speak. It is sufficient if there is simultaneous translation. In addition to the majority decision, two other justices of the Court held that the parties did have the right to be heard and understood by the judge in the language of their choice, but on the facts of the case, that standard was met.

== Decision ==
Justice Beetz, writing for the majority, held that the language rights of section 19(2) were different from most other rights in the Charter as they were the result of a political compromise and so must be read restrictively. The right to be tried in court in French does not even imply a right to an interpreter. The only right to be understood would be provided by fundamental justice and sections 7 and 14 of the Charter rather than language rights.

== Aftermath ==
The decision inspired criticism. Professors Leslie Green and Denise Réaume call it "troubling," noting the division of the Charter between rights to be read conservatively and liberally was not specific and so other rights besides the language rights were at risk of being conservatively read. Moreover, they questioned the meaning of conservative readings and said that even with supposed generous readings of the Charter, it is expected that courts are not making law.

Green also argued that when it comes to diminishing rights due to compromise and politics,

Most fundamental democratic rights, from Magna Carta to Declaration of the Rights of Man, from the Great Reform Act to the International Covenant, had seedy pasts. They were conceded reluctantly and only after protracted political battles and compromises in which ideology had greater power than political theory. Cynicism and scepticism about Canada's Charter is often bred of more attention to pedigree than to principle. Had Magna Carta been concluded under a system of representative government, the glare of lights and the whir of video-recorders, we would no doubt regard it too as a mere political compromise.

This decision was eventually reconsidered in R v Beaulac, [1999] 1 S.C.R. 768 where the Court rejected the Beetz interpretation in favour of the case's minority decision of Dickson and Wilson.
