= Canada (Minister of Citizenship and Immigration) v Khosa =

Canada (Citizenship and Immigration) v. Khosa
- Supreme Court of Canada

Hearing: March 20, 2008 Judgment: March 6, 2009
- Full case name: Minister of Citizenship and Immigration v. Sukhvir Singh Khosa
- Citations: 2009 SCC 12, [2009] 1 SCR 339
- Docket No.: 31952
- Prior history: Judgment for Khosa in the Federal Court of Appeal.
- Ruling: Appeal allowed.

Holding
- 1. Courts should give a measure of deference to administrative tribunal decisions.; 2. Statutorily defined grounds of review are not necessarily the same as the standard of review.; 3. "Reasonableness" is the standard of review to be applied to reviewing decisions of the Immigration Appeal Division of the Immigration and Refugee Board of Canada.

Court membership
- Chief Justice: Beverley McLachlin; Puisne Justices: Michel Bastarache, Ian Binnie, Louis LeBel, Marie Deschamps, Morris Fish, Rosalie Abella, Louise Charron, Marshall Rothstein

Reasons given
- Majority: Binnie J., joined by McLachlin C.J. and LeBel, Abella and Charron JJ.
- Concurrence: Rothstein J.
- Concurrence: Deschamps J.
- Dissent: Fish J.
- Bastarache J. took no part in the consideration or decision of the case.

Canada (Citizenship and Immigration) v. Khosa [2009] 1 S.C.R. 339, 2009 SCC 12, is a leading Supreme Court of Canada decision in Canadian administrative law.

== Summary ==
The summary reads:

Khosa, a citizen of India, immigrated to Canada with his family in 1996, at the age of 14. In 2002, he was found guilty of criminal negligence causing death and received a conditional sentence of two years less a day. A valid removal order was issued to return him to India.

Khosa appealed the order, but the majority of the Immigration Appeal Division (“IAD”) of the Immigration and Refugee Board, after considering the Ribic factors and the evidence, denied “special relief” on humanitarian and compassionate grounds pursuant to s. 67(1) (c) of the Immigration and Refugee Protection Act (“IRPA ”).

A majority of the Federal Court of Appeal applied a “reasonableness” simpliciter standard and set aside the IAD decision. It found that the majority of the IAD had some kind of fixation with the fact that the offence was related to street‑racing. On the issue of the “possibility of rehabilitation”, the majority of the IAD merely acknowledged the findings of the criminal courts in that regard, which were favourable to Khosa, and did not explain why it came to the contrary conclusion.

In the end, that court concluded that the majority of the IAD had acted unreasonably in denying relief.

Held (Fish J. dissenting): The appeal should be allowed.

== Judicial History ==
Khosa appealed the order to the Immigration Appeal Division (IAD) of the Immigration and Refugee Board. The majority of the IAD denied Khosa "special relief" on humanitarian and compassionate grounds. On appeal, the Federal Court reviewed the assessment of the IAD and found it to be reasonable. That decision was then appealed to the Federal Court of Appeal which then found that the decision had not been reasonable when they denied relief and set the decision aside.

== Opinion of the court ==
Binnie J. wrote for the majority, who found that s. 18.1 of the Federal Courts Act set out the threshold grounds which permit but do not require the court to grant relief when conducting judicial review. Binnie J. held that "whether or not the court should exercise its discretion in favour of the application will depend on the court's appreciation of the respective roles of the courts and the administration as well as the "circumstances in each case".

Applying the reasonableness standard from Dunsmuir v. New Brunswick, Binnie J. held that courts should be deferential to the IAD decisions and should not substitute its own findings. In the result, he found that the IAD decision was reasonable and restored its order.

== Dissenting opinion ==
Fish J. dissented, agreeing with the Court of Appeal that the decision was unreasonable on account of the IAD's emphasis on the specific fact that Khosa denied having engaged in street-racing, and would have granted a re-hearing in the IAD, concluding, "I agree that decisions of the IAD are entitled to deference. In my respectful view, however, deference ends where unreasonableness begins."

== See also ==
- List of Supreme Court of Canada cases (McLachlin Court)
- Suresh v. Canada (Minister of Citizenship and Immigration), 2002 SCC 1
- Ahani v. Canada (Minister of Citizenship and Immigration), 2002 SCC 2
- Baker v. Canada (Minister of Citizenship and Immigration), [1999] 2 SCR 817
- List of Supreme Court of Canada cases
