= Canadian Union of Public Employees, Local 963 v New Brunswick Liquor Corp =

- Supreme Court of Canada

Hearing: 1978: December 11 Judgment: 1979: March 30
- Full case name: Canadian Union of Public Employees, Local 963 v. New Brunswick Liquor Corporation
- Citations: [1979] 2 SCR 227
- Ruling: Appeal Allowed

Court membership
- Chief Justice: Bora Laskin; Puisne Justices: Ronald Martland, Roland Ritchie, Wishart Spence, Louis-Philippe Pigeon, Brian Dickson, Jean Beetz, Willard Estey, Yves Pratte

Reasons given
- Unanimous reasons by: Dickson J.

Laws applied
- Public Service Labour Relations Act, RSNB 1973 c P-25, ss. 19, 102(3)

Canadian Union of Public Employees, Local 963 v New Brunswick Liquor Corp, [1979] 2 SCR 227 is a leading case decided by the Supreme Court of Canada. This case first developed the patent unreasonableness standard of review in Canadian administrative law.

== Background ==
The unionized employees of the New Brunswick Liquor Corporation, represented by the Canadian Union of Public Employees, went on strike. During the strike the Liquor Corporation brought in the managers to do the work of the strikers. The union brought a suit against the employers claiming that their actions violated section 102(3) of the Public Service Labour Relations Act. At the same time, the employer also claimed that the union was in breach of the Act due to their picketing. The relevant section of the Act stated:

(a) the employer shall not replace the striking employees or fill their position with any other employee, and
(b) no employee shall picket, parade or in any manner demonstrate in or near any place of business of the employer.

The New Brunswick Public Service Labour Relations Board found that the Liquor Corporation had violated section 102(3), and at the same time found that the union had also violated the Act by picketing. The Board ordered both sides to cease their actions.

The Labour Board came to this decision after noting that the Legislature intended to restrict the possibility of picket-line violence by prohibiting both strikebreaking on one hand and picketing on the other.

The Liquor Corp appealed the Board's decision. Difficulties arose because of the privative clause in s. 101 of the Act, which declared that every "award, direction, decision, declaration, or ruling of the Board ... is final and shall not be questioned or reviewed in any court." Nevertheless, the Court of Appeal of New Brunswick overturned the decision on reinterpreting the Act's provision. CUPE then appealed to the Supreme Court.

The issue before the Supreme Court was whether the Board's decision was sufficiently incorrect to warrant overturning in the presence of the privative clause.

The Liquor Corporation argued that the Act should be interpreted as only preventing the replacement of employees "with any other employee". Under the Act, the definition of "employee" excluded managers, and their acts were therefore justified.

CUPE argued that the Act should be read so that replacement "with any other employee" applied only to permanent arrangements, and that temporary replacements were forbidden entirely even by non-employees.

== Opinion of the Court ==
Dickson J., writing for the unanimous Court, proposed a new analytical framework to approach administrative decisions. He noted that the existence of privative clauses indicated the legislative choice of empowering specialized administrative bodies to decide certain matters such as labour relations. Limited by such privative clauses, courts should only interfere if an interpretation of the Act was "so patently unreasonable that its construction cannot be rationally supported by the relevant legislation."

The Court held that the decision of the Labour Board was not patently unreasonable and reinstated the Board's decision. The court found that the section was "very badly drafted" and that it "bristles with ambiguities". The wording of the statute allowed multiple plausible interpretations, including both the Board's and the Court of Appeal's interpretation. As such, the decision of the Board should be given deference.

Further, the Court attempted to clarify the issue of jurisdiction. Dickson J. wrote that the preferable approach to jurisdictional problems is that "jurisdiction is typically to be determined at the outset of the inquiry", but also noted that:

The question of what is and is not jurisdictional is often very difficult to determine. The courts, in my view, should not be alert to brand as jurisdictional, and therefore subject to broader curial review, that which may be doubtfully so.

This decision was a major shift in the approach to judicial review. Prior to this decision, Canadian courts primarily concerned themselves with the question of whether an administrative body had acted within its own jurisdiction. If it was within the jurisdiction conferred upon it by the enabling statute, then its decisions were generally upheld. If it was found to go beyond its jurisdiction, then courts were free to overturn the decisions. This approach was often criticized for being overly formalistic and often led to courts labeling questions as jurisdictional without considering the reasons of the administrative decision-maker in question.

The new approach emphasized the need for deference in the proper circumstances, often considering relative expertise of the body and the legislative intention in creating such a body. In such cases where administrative decision-makers are acting properly within their own jurisdiction, courts are told to evaluate the decision on a standard of "patent unreasonableness".

== Aftermath ==
=== "Pragmatic and functional" analysis ===
In Union des Employes de Service, Local 298 v. Bibeault the Supreme Court revisited the standard of review, elaborating on what constitutes a jurisdictional question warranting a correctness standard and what questions were within an administrative body's jurisdiction warranting a patent unreasonableness standard.

There, the court developed the "pragmatic and functional analysis" to determine which standard of review to use. This analysis focused on whether the legislature intended "the question to be within the jurisdiction conferred on the tribunal."

Under this test, the court was examined four factors:

- the wording of the enactment conferring jurisdiction on the administrative tribunal (including the presence or absence of a privative clause),
- the purpose of the statute creating the tribunal,
- the expertise of its members, and
- the nature of the problem before the tribunal.

=== Developments in standards of review ===
The dichotomy between the correctness and "patent unreasonableness" standards was criticized by some legal commentators for its inflexibility. A third standard of review, that of "reasonableness simpliciter", was added following the decision in Canada (Director of Investigation and Research) v. Southam Inc., which fell between the correctness and patent unreasonableness standards in terms of deference.

The three standards, however, was difficult to apply in practice and was unsatisfactory because it allowed certain unreasonable but not patently unreasonable decisions to stand based primarily on the perceived expertise of administrative bodies and judicial deference. To address the issue, the Supreme Court in Dunsmuir v. New Brunswick collapsed the patent unreasonableness and unreasonableness tests into a single standard of reasonableness.

== See also ==
- List of Supreme Court of Canada cases
- Standard of review
- Union des Employes de Service, Local 298 v. Bibeault, [1988] 2 SCR 1048
- Dunsmuir v. New Brunswick, 2008 SCC 9, [2008] 1 SCR 190
