= Patently unreasonable =

Former Canadian legal doctrine

In Canadian law, patently unreasonable or the patent unreasonableness test was a standard of review used by a court when performing judicial review of administrative decisions. It was the highest of three standards of review: correctness, unreasonableness, and patent unreasonableness. Although the term "patent unreasonableness" lacked a precise definition in the common law, it was somewhere above unreasonableness, and consequently it was relatively difficult to show that a decision was patently unreasonable. A simple example of a patently unreasonable decision may be one that does not accord at all with the facts or law before it, or one that completely misstates a legal test.

By a decision issued on March 7, 2008, this test was removed from the law by the Supreme Court of Canada in Dunsmuir v New Brunswick as represented by Board of Management .

In Toronto (City) Board of Education v. O.S.S.T.F., District 15, [1997] 1 S.C.R. 487, at paras. 41–48, the majority of the Supreme Court of Canada noted that the test for whether a decision under review is patently unreasonable is articulated differently for findings of fact and findings of law. For interpreting a legislative provision, the test was whether the decision under review "cannot be rationally supported by the relevant legislation and demands intervention by the court upon review". In the context of a decision interpreting a collective labour agreement, the patently-unreasonable test was held to mean that the court will not intervene unless the words of the collective agreement have been given an interpretation they cannot reasonably bear.

When the reviewing court reviews the evidence that was before the original decision maker, on a question where the standard of review is patent unreasonableness, the reviewing court must determine whether "the evidence reasonably viewed is incapable of supporting the tribunal's findings" (para. 48).

In a recent decision The Owners, Strata Plan VR320 v Day, 2023 BCSC 364 at paras. 70-71 the Supreme Court of British Columbia clarified:

"To find the CRT’s interpretation patently unreasonable, there must be an immediately obvious defect – suggesting that there can only be one reasonable interpretation of the Second Resolution. This is not the case. Another reasonable interpretation could be that the special levy is due and payable on May 1, 2021, per the underlined phrase. It is also necessary to consider the context in which the Second Resolution was made. Even if the words were clear, a resolution cannot have an unlawful effect. It would be unlawful to allow for the Second Resolution to retroactively apply to Mr. Day – a former owner who did not have an opportunity to participate in discussions relating to the special levy purportedly established by the First Resolution – because such an interpretation contravenes the Ministerial Order."

"Even if the court considers parts of the tribunal’s rationale to be flawed or unreasonable, so long as the decision as a whole is reasonable, no patent unreasonableness can be found."

== See also ==
- Due process, the analogous standard of review in United States administrative law
- Wednesbury unreasonableness, the analogous standard of review in English administrative law
- Wednesbury unreasonableness in Singapore administrative law
