= National Corn Growers Assn v Canada (Import Tribunal) =

- Supreme Court of Canada

Hearing: 29 March 1990 Judgment: 8 November 1990
- Full case name: American Farm Bureau Federation v Canadian Import Tribunal
- Citations: [1990] 2 SCR 1324
- Docket No.: 21366, 21368
- Prior history: APPEAL from National Corn Growers Assn v Canada (Import Tribunal), [1989] 2 FCA 517
- Ruling: Appeal dismissed

Court membership
- Chief Justice: Brian Dickson; Puisne Justices: Antonio Lamer, Bertha Wilson, Gérard La Forest, Claire L'Heureux-Dubé, John Sopinka, Charles Gonthier, Peter Cory, Beverley McLachlin

Reasons given
- Majority: Gonthier J, joined by La Forest, L'Heureux-Dubé and McLachlin JJ
- Concurrence: Wilson J, joined by Dickson CJ and Lamer J
- Sopinka and Cory JJ took no part in the consideration or decision of the case.

National Corn Growers Assn v Canada (Import Tribunal), [1990] 2 SCR 1324 is a leading decision of the Supreme Court of Canada on judicial review and statutory interpretation.

The Canadian Import Tribunal conducted an inquiry of the importation of grain from the US under s.42 of the Special Import Measures Act. The Tribunal found that the subsidization of grain imports were potentially the cause of "material injury" to the production in Canada.

The National Corn Growers Association applied for judicial review of the decision. They argued that the Tribunal had no jurisdiction to determine potential injuries under the Act.

Justice Gonthier, applying the analysis in Canadian Union of Public Employees, Local 963 v. New Brunswick Liquor Corp. 1979 found that the standard under which the decision can be reviewed is one of patent unreasonableness. In his view, the Tribunal could indeed consider the issue of potential injury. The existence of a privative clause was sufficient to accord the Tribunal deference in review. He emphasized that the reviewing court is not to determine the correct answer with which to compare the Tribunal's decision in order to determine the reasonableness of it.

Justice Wilson, in concurrence, considered meaning of the advent of the "pragmatic and functional approach" found in the NB Liquor case and in U.E.S., Local 298 v. Bibeault, 1988. Underlying it was the principle of the rule of law. In contrast to Gonthier, who assessed whether the Tribunal had made a patently unreasonable error with respect to each issue before the Court, Wilson wrote that a proper application of the approach required a more general assessment of the Tribunal's decision. The court's job, she noted, was to determine whether the Tribunal had made a patently unreasonable error in the sense that it exceeded the statutory mandate given to it by Parliament.

== See also ==
- List of Supreme Court of Canada cases
