= A (a Minor) v Minister for Justice and Equality and others =

Irish Supreme Court case

- Coat of arms of Ireland
- Court: Supreme Court of Ireland
- Citation: 2013 IESC 18, (2013) 2 ILRM 457

Case history
- Appealed from: High Court
- Appealed to: Supreme Court

Court membership
- Judges sitting: Denham CJ

Case opinions
- The Supreme Court concluded that a certificate of leave to appeal was not required in order to appeal a decision of the High Court to dismiss proceedings as frivolous or vexatious.
- Concurrence: Clarke J, Murray J

Keywords
- Asylum, judicial review, immigration, ouster

A (a Minor) v Minister for Justice and Equality, Refugee Applications Commissioner, Ireland and the Attorney General [2013] IESC 18, (2013) 2 ILRM 457 is an Irish Supreme Court case where the Supreme Court concluded that a certificate of leave to appeal was not required in order to appeal to the Supreme Court a decision of the High Court to dismiss proceedings as frivolous or vexatious.

== Background ==
This case involved a child "A", suing by her mother and next friend (the appellant). The appellant was born in Ireland in 2010 and was the child of a Nigerian national, who came to Ireland in 2005. The appellant applied for asylum in Ireland, which application was rejected by the Refugee Applications Commissioner in July 2011. The application for asylum was rejected on the basis that:

(a) The appellant was born [in Ireland] and has never been to Nigeria and has never suffered persecution;

(b) State protection would be available to the appellant against circumcision if her mother opposed it, according to country of origin information;

(c) the threat from the family in the village could be avoided by returning to another location in Nigeria such as Edo State.

The appellant (through her mother) sought judicial review of the Refugee Applications Commissioner's decision to refuse the asylum application. As part of this application, the appellant sought a number of reliefs - "including an order quashing the decision of the [Refugee Applications] Commissioner that the appellant failed to establish a well founded fear of persecution as defined under s.2 of the Refugee Act, 1996, as amended."

The Minister for Justice and Equality, Refugee Applications Commissioner, Ireland and the Attorney General (the respondents) sought an order dismissing the proceedings of the appellant "on the grounds that they were frivolous, and/or vexatious, and/or doomed to fail, and/or an abuse of the process."

The High Court agreed with the respondents. The High Court agreed with the Refugee Applications Commissioner's reasoning for denying asylum and found that there was no need for judicial review in this instance and that a motion of appeal against the Refugee Applications Commissioners report would be more appropriate. As the High Court noted, "the generalised grounds, divorced from any specific flaws in a challenged decision, raise a prima facie implication that the judicial review proceeding had been commenced as a delaying tactic only."

The appellant appealed against, and sought an order setting aside, the High Court judgment and order dismissing the proceedings as "frivolous, and/or vexatious, and/or doomed to fail, and/or an abuse of the process". The respondents sought to have the appeal struck out on the basis that the appellant had not obtained a certificate of leave to appeal from the High Court - this certificate was, according to the respondents, required under s5(3)(a) Illegal Immigrants (Trafficking) Act 2000.

== Holding of the Supreme Court ==
The written judgment was provided by Denham CJ, with whom Murray J and Clarke J concurred.

S5(3)(a) Illegal Immigrants (Trafficking) Act 2000 provides that:

The determination of the High Court of an application for leave to apply for judicial review as aforesaid or of an application for such judicial review shall be final and no appeal shall lie from the decision of the High Court to the Supreme Court in either case except with the leave of the High Court which leave shall only be granted where the High Court certifies that its decision involves a point of law of exceptional public importance and that it is desirable in the public interest that an appeal should be taken to the Supreme Court.

The question for the court was, therefore, whether the order of the High Court dismissing the proceedings was a "determination of the High Court of an application for leave to apply for judicial review" in respect of which a certificate of leave to appeal was required.

The Supreme Court granted an appeal without the need for a certificate. The appellant's application for leave to apply for judicial review had not been heard by the High Court. The High Court's decision was, rather, based on the respondent's motion to quash an application for judicial review. The High Court's ruling was not, therefore, a 'determination' within the meaning of s5(3)(a) Illegal Immigrants (Trafficking) Act 2000. The Court relied on the reasoning of Geoghegan J in B. v Minister for Justice, Equality & Law Reform where Geoghegan J noted that:

Under the express terms of the Act the restrictions on the right of appeal to the Supreme Court apply to the application for leave or the application for judicial review and as a matter of ordinary grammar and syntax, I find it difficult to see how it could be argued that there is an ouster of the right of appeal from a refusal to extend time. If the Oireachtas had intended that, it should have said so. Until the extension is granted there is no application for leave in existence. But even if as a matter of grammar and syntax, such an argument could be made, there is certainly not a clear and unambiguous ouster of the right of appeal which is required under the constitutional jurisprudence …

Applying this reasoning to the present case, Denham CJ noted "[t]he issues involved in a motion to dismiss may be substantially different from those involved in an application for leave to apply for judicial review". She went on to note that the wording of s5(3)(a) Illegal Immigrants (Trafficking) Act 2000 did not ouster the right of appeal.

The court concluded that the appellant could bring an appeal without the need for a certificate of the High Court.
