= ACGA =

ACGA may refer to:

- American Community Gardening Association, a non-profit organization
- An Comunn Gàidhealach, Ameireaga, a Scottish Gaelic language and cultural organization
- Australian Commonwealth Games Association, the national body responsible for Commonwealth Games operations, publicity and development in Australia
- American Corn Growers Association, a non-profit commodity and advocacy organization
- American Council on Gift Annuities, which publishes suggested charitable gift annuity rates for use by charities and their donors
