= Judicial review in Canada =

Canadian legal processes

In Canadian administrative law, judicial review is for courts to ensure "administrative decision-makers" stay within the boundaries of the law. It is meant to ensure that powers granted to government actors, administrative agencies, boards and tribunals are exercised consistently with the rule of law. Judicial review is intended as a last resort for those seeking to redress a decision of an administrative decision maker.

== History ==
Judicial review in Canada has its roots in the English common law system, where there are two sources of judicial review: the prerogative writs of certiorari and mandamus, and actions for damages. The British colonies that now form Canada were subject to administrative law from their very beginnings. Legal mechanisms were put into place to ensure that legislation created in the colonies was compliant with British law. The colonial legislatures had limited power, and the statutes that created them contained clauses which prevented them from passing laws that were non-compliant with British law. Judicial review of statutes passed in the colonies were carried out by the Judicial Committee of the Privy Council. This committee was created and obtained the power of judicial review through the Judicial Committee Act 1833 and the Judicial Committee Act 1844. The ability to review the statutes of the colonies meant that the Judicial Committee of the Privy Council became the highest appellate court for the colonies. The precedent of judicial review was set by the Judicial Committee, and subsequently, the Constitution Act, 1867 was drafted with a provision allowing for the courts to enforce limitations of legislative powers through judicial review.

According to Crevier v Quebec (AG), section 96 of the Constitution Act, 1867 provides the superior courts of the provinces with "inherent constitutionally protected jurisdiction to decide the vires and constitutionality of any enactment, whether federal or provincial, unless that jurisdiction is explicitly taken away within the constitutional limits." Administrative decision-makers are subject to judicial review, and adhere to administrative law.

Section 101 of the Constitution Act, 1867 contains the clause that gives Parliament the power to create a "General Court of Appeal for the Federated Provinces." There is much debate amongst scholars whether or not this clause was initially meant to replace the Judicial Committee. Despite the intentions of the drafters of the constitution, section 101 was used to create first the Supreme and Exchequer courts, both of which were explicitly formed, in part, to replace the Judicial Committee. In 1971, the Federal Court (composed of two divisions, the Federal Court of Appeal and the Federal Court, Trial Division) replaced the Exchequer Court of Canada. In 2003, the Federal Court was split into two separate courts, the Federal Court of Appeal and the Federal Court. The federal courts have jurisdiction over judicial review with respect to decisions of federal administrative tribunals and other matters of federal jurisdiction.

== Basic principles ==
=== Judicial discretion ===
Courts may exercise their discretion and decide not to hear an application for judicial review. In order for the court to proceed with an application for judicial review, the issue being appealed must be public in nature. Certain Crown actors are immune from judicial review. The scope of what is public is broad, and the decisions of private, or semi-private entities are sometimes determined to be sufficiently public as to undergo judicial review.

The court needs to be satisfied that the party making the claim has standing, and that it has jurisdiction to hear the application. As well, the court analyzes whether the application was made within an appropriate amount of time, and whether the parties have exhausted all avenues of recourse, including grievances and appeals. An application for judicial review does not automatically stop the administrative proceedings. In order to halt the proceedings, if they are ongoing, the applicant must also apply for a stay of proceedings.

=== Grounds ===
"Most administrative decisions can be reviewed in the courts for their reasonableness and procedural fairness: they must comply with the law and be made in a procedurally fair manner; and the reviewing process can be triggered by making an application for judicial review - writs don't come into it ... This involves some deference by the courts to the decision-makers: in determining whether the boundaries have been respected, the courts will give weight (sometimes significant weight) to the views of the decision makers in question ... [T]he idea that a privative clause can exclude an entire area from judicial oversight has long since been rejected: reasonableness and procedural fairness permeate all areas of public administration."

Certain grounds for judicial review are laid out in s. 18.1(4) of the Federal Courts Act. This section of the act also transfers authority over judicial review against any federal body from the provincial superior courts to the federal courts.

=== Standard of review ===
The standard of review is the degree of scrutiny applied by the courts to administrative action. Standard of review exists in two forms: correctness, and reasonableness. A third standard, patent unreasonableness, was abolished in Dunsmuir v New Brunswick. The framework for judicial review was revised in Canada (Minister of Citizenship and Immigration) v Vavilov, which "conclusively closes the door on the application of a contextual analysis to determining the applicable standard, and in doing so streamlines and simplifies the standard.”

All decisions are now presumed to be held to a standard of reasonableness. This presumption can be rebutted in two ways: 1) through clear legislative intent; or, 2) if the rule of law requires that the standard of correctness be applied. The rule of law can require that the standard of correctness be applied in regards to constitutional questions, general questions of law of central importance to the whole legal system, and questions regarding jurisdictional boundaries between administrative bodies.

==== Reasonableness ====
A review of reasonableness reflects the principle of judicial restraint but at the same time, remains a robust form of judicial review. When conducting a review of reasonableness, the court examines an administrative decision for its transparency, intelligibility and justification, and looks at whether the decision falls within a range of acceptable outcomes that are defensible in respect of the facts and the law.

==== Correctness ====
The correctness standard is applied when the courts give little deference to the administrative decision maker, and decide to review the decision in its entirety. When applying the correctness standard, the court carries out its own statutory analysis and arrive at its own understanding of how the issue should be decided.

=== Remedies ===
The remedies available to the courts when they are performing judicial review are all forms of injunction that originated with the early English prerogative writs. While monetary damages are common in private law, they are not a typical remedy of judicial review.

"Even where a court has determined that a decision is unreasonable or procedurally unfair, it retains the power to refuse to grant a remedy, or to grant a remedy subject to conditions . . . [The] reviewing court that has quashed an administrative decision [may] "remit the matter to the decision-maker for reconsideration with the benefit of the court's reasons" . . . Remitting the matter will "most often" be the appropriate course of action, as "the legislature has entrusted the matter to the administrative decision maker, and not the court, to decide.""

=== Limits ===
"When an applicant brings an application for judicial review, a judge must consider the application: that is, at a minimum, the judge must determine whether judicial review is appropriate. If, in considering the application, the judge determines that one of the discretionary bases for refusing a remedy is present, they may decline to consider the merits of the judicial review application. The judge also has the discretion to refuse to grant a remedy, even if they find that the decision under review is unreasonable."

== Legislation ==
The jurisdiction of the application for judicial review determines which governing legislation will be used. The Federal Court has exclusive jurisdiction over relief against federal boards, commissions, or other tribunals. The superior courts in each province, governed by rules of civil procedure, have exclusive jurisdiction for judicial review of decisions of provincial administrative agencies.

=== The Federal Courts Act ===
The Federal Courts Act, and the concurrent Federal Courts Rules govern any application for judicial review in the federal courts. The source of this power can be found in s. 28 of the Federal Courts Act, which provides that the Federal Court of Appeal is the appropriate venue for judicial review of decisions by federal boards and tribunals. In the federal courts, there is a specific 30 day time limitation with which to make an application for judicial review, which can be found in s.18.1(2).

=== British Columbia's Judicial Review Procedure Act and Administrative Tribunals Act ===
This British Columbia legislation governs the superior courts judicial review of administrative tribunals' decisions. The Act only has twenty-one sections, but each contains important provisions for applications for judicial review in British Columbia. When considering the Act, it is important to remember that other legislation impacts it, such as the Administrative Tribunal Act, which creates a 60 day time limit for judicial review. This directly affects s. 11 of the Act, and the court in Braut v Johnson determined that the 60 day limitation period governs, where the applicant has not shown that they have: 1) serious grounds for relief; 2) a reasonable explanation for the delay in application; and, 3) no substantial prejudice or hardship will result to a person affected by the delay.

Other important sections include section 1, which defines the terms and parties included in judicial review, and states that all relevant judicial review must take place in the Supreme Court of British Columbia. Section 5 allows the court to send back any part of the decision for reconsideration, whether it be the whole or the part. Section 18 abolishes the quo warranto remedy, and section 12 addresses the writs of mandamus, prohibition, and certiorari, which are not issued.

=== Ontario Judicial Review Procedure Act ===
In Ontario, the JRPA governs the mechanism of judicial review.

== Criticisms ==
Judicial review of administrative actions is a controversial part of Canadian law. Proponents of judicial review argue that it is a mechanism that forces governments to act within their statutory limits. Another common justification for judicial review is that administrative tribunals perform functions similar to the courts, and should therefore be subject to the same procedural safeguards.

Critics of judicial review argue that allowing the judiciary to review decisions, and ultimately change outcomes, of decisions made by elected representatives is undemocratic. A second issue regarding judicial review that is frequently criticized is the administrative law's inability to adapt quickly. This is particularly prevalent when considering the increase of private contracting taking place in public institutions. Scholars have stated that if the administrative law does not adapt to this change, then courts' abilities to judicially review the decisions of administrative bodies will not be as strong.

== See also ==
- Canadian administrative law
