= Toronto (City) Board of Education v Ontario Secondary School Teachers' Federation, District 15 =

- Supreme Court of Canada

Hearing: November 6, 1996 Judgment: February 27, 1997
- Full case name: The Board of Education for the City of Toronto v. Ontario Secondary School Teachers’ Federation, District 15 (Toronto), Owen Shime, Q.C., A. S. Merritt and L. A. Jones
- Citations: [1997] 1 S.C.R. 487
- Docket No.: 24724
- Ruling: Appeal allowed

Court membership
- Chief Justice: Antonio Lamer; Puisne Justices: Gérard La Forest, Claire L'Heureux-Dubé, John Sopinka, Charles Gonthier, Peter Cory, Beverley McLachlin, Frank Iacobucci, John C. Major

Reasons given
- Majority: Cory J. (paras. 1-79), joined by Lamer C.J. and La Forest, Sopinka, Gonthier, McLachlin, Iacobucci and Major JJ.
- Concurrence: L'Heureux-Dube J. (paras. 80-100)

Toronto (City) Board of Education v Ontario Secondary School Teachers' Federation, District 15, [1997] 1 S.C.R. 487 is a leading decision of the Supreme Court of Canada on judicial review of administrative decisions. The Court held that the review of a just cause dismissal was patently unreasonable on the basis that the decision had no evidentiary basis.

== Background ==
Jagdish Bhadauria, a secondary school teacher, had made 39 applications for a position of vice-principal. He was granted several interviews but never hired. He filed a complaint to the human rights commission for discrimination. His claim of systemic discrimination was not made out and his claim was rejected. During and immediately following the adjudication of Bhadauria's complaint, he wrote three letters to members of the senior administration of his employer board of education comparing the actions of select administrators to those of Adolf Hitler, Idi Amin, Augusto Pinochet, and others.

Bhadauria was subjected to psychiatric assessment by two separate doctors. Both doctors believed he was intent on frightening the board of education but was not likely to be violent. One opinion recommended therapy. On receipt of both medical opinions, Bhadauria's position as a teacher was terminated. Through his union, Bhadauria filed a grievance for termination without just cause.

The Board of Arbitration found that Bhadauria was dismissed without just cause and he was given an award. The Board of Education applied for judicial review to the divisional court, who then quashed the ruling. On appeal to the Ontario Court of Appeal, the arbitration award was restored.

The issue before the Supreme Court was whether "the Board of Arbitration made a patently unreasonable decision in ordering that Mr. Bhadauria be conditionally reinstated in his position as a teacher with the appellant Board of Education."

== Reasons of the court ==
Justice Cory, writing for the majority, allowed the appeal.

Cory found that the proper standard of review of a finding of "just cause" is one of patent unreasonableness based on the privative clause of the board's constituting legislation and the factual nature of the question. Courts should give great deference where the decision rests largely on findings of facts based on evidence presented at a hearing.

The arbitration board had found that Bhadauria's misconduct was temporary as it was due to his frustration at the school board, and that he was not beyond redemption. The Court held that there was no evidence at all that supported these claims and so ruled that the conclusion was patently unreasonable.

== See also ==
- List of Supreme Court of Canada cases
