= R (Privacy International) v Investigatory Powers Tribunal =

2019 Supreme Court of the United Kingdom case

- Court: Supreme Court of the United Kingdom
- Full case name: R (on the application of Privacy International) v Investigatory Powers Tribunal and others
- Decided: 15 May 2019
- Citations: [2019] UKSC 22; [2019] 2 WLR 1219; [2019] HRLR 13; [2019] 4 All ER 1

Case history
- Appealed from: [2017] EWCA Civ 1868

R (Privacy International) v Investigatory Powers Tribunal [2019] UKSC 22, is a judgment of the Supreme Court of the United Kingdom. It caused controversy due to the majority's suggestion that courts will not give effect to ouster clauses even when Parliament's intent is clear, thus undermining the concept of parliamentary sovereignty.

== Facts ==
Section 67(8) of the Regulation of Investigatory Powers Act 2000 purported to exclude from challenge or appeal any decision of the Investigatory Powers Tribunal (IPT). The Tribunal ruled against an application by Privacy International relating to the proper construction of a section of the Intelligence Services Act 1994.

Privacy International sought judicial review of the IPT's decision. It lost in both the High Court (Sir Brian Leveson P and Leggatt J) and in the Court of Appeal (Sales, Flaux, and Floyd LJJ).

== Judgment ==
Lord Sumption (with whom Lord Reed agreed) and Lord Wilson dissented.

== Commentary ==
Richard Ekins said the ruling "undermines the rule of law and violates the sovereignty of Parliament". According to Ekins, any judge who deliberately ignored an ouster clause "would warrant removal from office in accordance with the terms of the Senior Courts Act 1981".
