= National Corn Growers Association =

Corn growers association in the United States

- Formation: 1957; 69 years ago
- Website: ncga.com

The National Corn Growers Association (NCGA) is an association that represents and advocates for the interests of corn growers in the United States. It is distinct from the American Corn Growers Association, a competing organization set up in 1987.

== Areas of support and advocacy ==
NCGA plays a dual role of providing standards and guidelines for corn growers and processors, as well as advocating for their interests to a wider audience including regulators, lawmakers, and the general public.

=== Biotechnology ===
NCGA provides standards and guidelines for the efficacious use of biotechnology in corn production (with particular attention to the use of genetically modifiedversions of corn), as well as advocating its benefits.

NCGA has represented farmers in deals made with companies such as Monsanto that produce genetically modified crops, where farmers share data with the companies in exchange for tips from the companies on planting strategies.

=== Ethanol ===
In addition to being used as food, corn is a source of ethanol fuel, and the NCGA has provided standards and guidelines for farmers growing ethanol.

The NCGA has also advocated for continued support and subsidies from the United States government for the ethanol fuel program, citing studies on the benefits for fighting climate change of switching away from fossil fuels towards ethanol.

The NCGA has cultivated close relationships with political candidates including United States President Barack Obama, back when he was a Presidential Candidate for the 2008 Presidential election.

=== Farm policy and crop insurance ===
NCGA actively defends the interests of corn growers in government farm policy, including advocating for subsidies for crop insurance in annual farm bills. In addition, it also publishes material and conducts webinars to better educate farmers about the options available to them for crop insurance.

=== Other areas ===
NCGA also educates farmers and advocates for their interests in the following areas:

- Conservation, which is often also mentioned as a way of avoiding the perverse effects of crop insurance.
- Livestock
- Research
- Sustainability
- Trade
- Transportation

== Affiliated organizations ==
The National Corn Growers Association works with state affiliates.

== See also ==
- American Corn Growers Association, a rival association started in 1987
- National Association of Wheat Growers
- National Corn Growers Assn v Canada (Import Tribunal)
