= Ahani v Canada (Minister of Citizenship and Immigration) =

- Supreme Court of Canada

Hearing: May 22, 2001 Judgment: January 11, 2002
- Full case name: Mansour Ahani v. The Minister of Citizenship and Immigration and the Attorney General of Canada
- Citations: [2002] 1 S.C.R. 72, 2002 SCC 2
- Docket No.: 27792
- Prior history: Judgment for the Crown in the Federal Court of Appeal.
- Ruling: Appeal dismissed.

Holding
- A person at risk of being deported has an evidentiary onus to show that they are at risk of being tortured to receive protection under the Canadian Charter of Rights and Freedoms.

Court membership
- Chief Justice: Beverley McLachlin; Puisne Justices: Claire L'Heureux-Dubé, Charles Gonthier, Frank Iacobucci, John C. Major, Michel Bastarache, Ian Binnie, Louise Arbour, Louis LeBel

Reasons given
- Unanimous reasons by: The Court

Ahani v Canada (Minister of Citizenship and Immigration) [2002] 1 S.C.R. 72; 2002 SCC 2 is a significant decision of the Supreme Court of Canada in the areas of constitutional law and administrative law. It is a companion case to Suresh v. Canada (Minister of Citizenship and Immigration), [2002] 1 S.C.R. 3. Both cases deal with the procedure for removal of Convention refugees for reasons of national security under the Immigration Act, R.S.C. 1985, and address questions of procedural fairness.

== Background ==
Mansour Ahani entered Canada in 1991, claiming Convention refugee status. In 1993, the Minister of Citizenship and Immigration filed a security certificate for Ahani's deportation based on a report from the Canadian Security Intelligence Service (CSIS). CSIS claimed to have obtained evidence that Ahani was a trained assassin operating with the Ministry of Intelligence and National Security of Iran (MOIS). Ahani admitted to an association with MOIS and having received military training, he denied that he was an assassin. Ahani argued that he would likely face torture if deported to Iran, and that deportation under these circumstances would be a violation of fundamental justice, a right guaranteed by Section 7 of the Canadian Charter of Rights and Freedoms.

== Ruling of the Court ==
As in Suresh v. Canada (Minister of Citizenship and Immigration), the Court ruled that when a refugee establishes a prima facie case that deportation may lead to torture, they are entitled to a higher degree of procedural protections than the Immigration Act stipulates. In particular, the appellant has a right to know the full case against him, and to be given a full opportunity to respond in writing. The appellant must be allowed to rebut claims and evidence and to produce their own evidence. Finally, the appellant has the right to receive written reasons for a decision of the Minister.

In this case, the court ruled that the requirements of procedural fairness had been met. This result differs from the Suresh case, where the Court ruled that procedural fairness requirements had not been met, and ordered a new hearing. Ruling unanimously, the Court concluded:

We are satisfied that Ahani was fully informed of the Minister's case against him and given a full opportunity to respond. Insofar as the procedures followed may not have precisely complied with those we suggest in Suresh, we are satisfied that this did not prejudice him. We conclude that the process accorded to Ahani was consistent with the principles of fundamental justice and would reject this ground of appeal.

== See also ==
- List of Supreme Court of Canada cases (McLachlin Court)
- By the Court decisions of the Supreme Court of Canada
