= Canada (Director of Investigation and Research) v Southam Inc =

- Supreme Court of Canada

Hearing: November 25, 1996 Judgment: November 25, 1996 and March 30, 1997
- Full case name: Southam Inc., Lower Mainland Publishing Ltd., RIM Publishing Inc., Yellow Cedar Properties Ltd., North Shore Free Press Ltd., Specialty Publishers Inc., and Elty Publications Ltd. v, Director of Investigation and Research
- Citations: [1997] 1 S.C.R. 748
- Docket No.: 24915
- Prior history: Judgment for the Director of Investigation and Research (Competition Tribunal) in the Federal Court of Appeal.
- Ruling: Appeal allowed in part.

Holding
- Besides the standards of "correctness" and "patently unreasonableness", a middle-ground standard of review is required for certain judicial reviews: the standard of "reasonableness".

Court membership
- Chief Justice: Antonio Lamer; Puisne Justices: Gérard La Forest, Claire L'Heureux-Dubé, John Sopinka, Charles Gonthier, Peter Cory, Beverley McLachlin, Frank Iacobucci, John C. Major

Reasons given
- Unanimous reasons by: Iacobucci J.

Canada (Director of Investigation and Research) v Southam Inc, [1997] 1 S.C.R. 748 is a leading decision of the Supreme Court of Canada on judicial review. In this case the Court first set out the standard of review of "reasonableness simpliciter", which directs the court to only review decisions that are "not supported by any reasons that can stand up to a somewhat probing examination".

== Background ==
Southam Inc. purchased a number of small newspapers in the Vancouver region. The Competition Bureau investigated the purchase as a violation of the Competition Act. The Competition Tribunal held that Southam violated section 92 of the Competition Act and ordered the company to sell off one of the papers. The Tribunal found that the newspapers were not in the same market with regards to print advertising markets. There was a decrease of competition in real estate advertising and not the retail advertising market.

Southam appealed under section 13 of the Act to the Federal Court of Appeal. The Federal Court of Appeal held that it owed no deference to the Tribunal's finding that the markets were not the same and so it substituted its own findings that the markets were the same. The Court refused to set aside the remedy that had been ordered.

The issue before the Supreme Court was whether the Tribunal warranted any deference by the reviewing court.

== Judgment ==
Justice Iacobucci, writing for a unanimous Court, held that the appeal should be allowed but the remedy should stay.

Iacobucci J. considered four factors to determine the standard of review from Pezim v. British Columbia (Superintendent of Brokers). There was a statutory right of appeal but no privative clause, so the first factor indicated less deference; however, the absence of a privative clause was not determinative. In his view, the issue was one of mixed fact and law that was based on the balancing of interests, so the courts should be reluctant to re-examine the evidence. Iacobucci considered the purpose of the Act, which he stated was to encourage and promote competition and equality among companies. In his view this purpose was more economic policy than law and so suggests greater deference. Finally, he considered the expertise of the Tribunal, which he considered to be the most important factor. He found the Tribunal had expertise in matters of economics and commerce which were critical in assessing the question before the Tribunal and this required the courts to defer to their skill and judgment.

With this analysis in mind, Iacobucci devised a standard of review in between "correctness" and "patent unreasonableness". A standard of "reasonableness simpliciter" was said to apply to decisions that are "not supported by any reasons that can stand up to a somewhat probing examination".

== See also ==
- List of Supreme Court of Canada cases
