= Canada (Minister of Citizenship and Immigration) v Vavilov =

Canadian legal case

- Supreme Court of Canada

Hearing: December 4–6, 2018 Judgment: December 19, 2019
- Citations: 2019 SCC 65
- Docket No.: 37748
- Prior history: Judgment for Vavilov in the Federal Court of Appeal, 2017 FCA 132; Judgment for Canada in the Federal Court, 2015 FC 960

Court membership
- Chief Justice: Richard Wagner; Puisne Justices: Rosalie Abella, Michael Moldaver, Andromache Karakatsanis, Clément Gascon, Suzanne Côté, Russell Brown, Malcolm Rowe, Sheilah Martin

Reasons given
- Majority: Richard Wagner, Michael Moldaver, Clément Gascon, Suzanne Côté, Russell Brown, Malcolm Rowe, Sheilah Martin
- Concurrence: Rosalie Abella, Andromache Karakatsanis

Canada (Minister of Citizenship and Immigration) v Vavilov, 2019 SCC 65, is a landmark decision of the Supreme Court of Canada that clarified the determination and application of standard of review in Canadian administrative law. Vavilov applies “a presumption that reasonableness is the applicable standard whenever a court reviews administrative decisions.”

The case concerned the review of the Canadian Registrar of Citizenship's decision to cancel Alexander Vavilov's citizenship certificate on the basis of his parents' identity as covert Russian agents, based on an interpretation of s. 3(2)(a) of the Citizenship Act. The Supreme Court of Canada affirmed the Federal Court of Appeal's decision to quash the Canadian Registrar of Citizenship's decision, on the basis that it was unreasonable.

== Facts ==
Vavilov concerns the proper interpretation of a provision of the Citizenship Act as applied to Alexander Vavilov. Vavilov was born in Toronto in 1994 to Donald Heathfield (born Andrey Bezrukov) and Tracey Foley (born Elena Stanislavovna Vavilova), who were foreign nationals residing in Canada working for the Russian Foreign Intelligence Service (SVR) under the auspices of the Illegals Program. Their story partially inspired the 2013–2018 period spy drama television series The Americans.

The question was whether the Citizenship Act barred Vavilov from being considered a citizen under it, which prevents children of a "diplomatic or consular officer or other representative or employee in Canada of a foreign government" from receiving Canadian citizenship. Canada's Registrar of Citizenship held that the statute barred Vavilov from receiving citizenship. The Federal Court agreed with the Registrar. Then Vavilov filed an appeal to the Federal Court of Appeal which was allowed. The Minister of Citizenship and Immigration appealed that decision to the Supreme Court of Canada, which dismissed the appeal and decided in favour of Vavilov.

== Background ==
In Canada, before a court assesses whether the decision of an administrative tribunal was lawful, it decides what standard of review to apply to that decision. To determine the standard of review, in essence, is to decide how much scrutiny the reviewing court will apply to the decision.

From the 1980s to the early 2000s, Canadian courts had three standards of review to choose from: patent unreasonableness, under which the reviewing court would overturn the decision only if it was plainly defective; reasonableness simpliciter, under which the reviewing court would determine if the reasons given by the administrative decisionmaker in fact supported its decision; and correctness, in which the reviewing court would substitute its own judgment for the decisionmaker's.

The "patent unreasonableness" standard was eliminated in Dunsmuir v New Brunswick, which established two standards of review: reasonableness, a more deferential standard; and correctness, a non-deferential standard. Under Dunsmuir, a reviewing court would determine which standard applied by applying a multi-part test, which considered, among other things, which standard of review had been applied in the past, and whether the question at issue fell into a set of categories in which correctness review was appropriate.

== Supreme Court ==
The Supreme Court, in a 343-paragraph judgment, agreed with Vavilov and quashed the Registrar's decision. It determined that the Registrar's decision was unreasonable and that the law was not intended to apply to children of foreign government representatives or employees who have not been granted diplomatic privileges and immunities. Thus, Vavilov was able to regain his Canadian citizenship. The Court, in holding for Vavilov, established a new framework for determining the standard of review in Canadian administrative law.

Firstly, the court decided that reasonableness was the default standard of review. It then outlined two kinds of exceptions to that general rule, under which the correctness standard would apply instead. The first exception is if the legislature has indicated that correctness is appropriate. That may be the case if the relevant statute explicitly defines the standard of review, or the statute allows a litigant to appeal a decision of an administrative tribunal to a court instead of using judicial review. The second exception is if the rule of law requires a correctness standard. The court held that is the case when constitutional questions are at issue, when the administrative decision involves a "general question of law of central importance to the legal system as a whole," or when the decision under review pertains to the jurisdiction of two or more tribunals.

Vavilov re-defined the methodology for reasonableness and correctness review. According to Paul Daly, "Reasonableness review is at once robust in policing limits of administrative decision-making authority and respectful in appreciating that "'[a]dministrative justice' will not always look like 'judicial justice.'" Although Vavilovian reasonableness review is inherently deferential, it is nonetheless more demanding than the articulation of the reasonableness standard developed in previous cases: decisions must be justified, not merely justifiable; decision makers must demonstrate their expertise; a decision must be responsive to the particularities of, and presented by, the parties; and only contemporaneous reasons can be offered in support of the reasonableness of the decision."

== See also ==
- Dunsmuir v New Brunswick
- Hoda Muthana

== Sources ==
- Daly, Paul (2023). A Culture of Justification: Vavilov and the Future of Administrative Law. UBC Press.
- Heckman, Gerald P.; Khoday, Amar (2019). "Once More unto the Breach: Confronting the Standard of Review (Again) and the Imperative of Correctness Review when Interpreting the Scope of Refugee Protection". Dalhousie Law Journal. 42 (1). 2019 CanLIIDocs 2819.
