= Knight v Indian Head School Division No 19 =

- Supreme Court of Canada

Hearing: November 28, 29, 1989 Judgment: March 29, 1990
- Full case name: The Board of Education of the Indian Head School Division No 19 of Saskatchewan v Ronald Gary Knight
- Citations: [1990] 1 S.C.R. 653
- Ruling: Appeal allowed.

Court membership
- Chief Justice: Brian Dickson; Puisne Justices: Antonio Lamer, Bertha Wilson, Gérard La Forest, Claire L'Heureux-Dubé, John Sopinka, Charles Gonthier, Peter Cory, Beverley McLachlin

Reasons given
- Majority: L'Heureux-Dubé J.

Knight v Indian Head School Division No 19, [1990] 1 S.C.R. 653 is a leading decision of the Supreme Court of Canada on procedural fairness in Canadian administrative law. The Court created a threshold test to determine whether an administrative process invoked a common law duty of fairness based on the nature of the decision, relationship between the parties, and the effect on the individual claimant.

== Background ==
Ronald Gary Knight was dismissed as superintendent of a school board. His position was held at pleasure. His dismissal was not for personal reasons, but he claimed procedural fairness should apply and a hearing should have been held.

== 3 Prong Test ==
In order for procedural fairness to apply at common-law, certain requirements must be met. According to L'Heureux-Dubé J. they are:

1.Administrative powers attract procedural fairness while legislative powers do not

Final decision maker

- Preliminary or interlocutory decisions don't invoke procedural fairness

2. Relationship existing between that body and the individual; and

- Exercise of power is pursuant to statute (or prerogative) (executive action)

3. Effect of that decision on the individual's rights (privileges / interests)

- Low threshold requiring only that applicant have an interest and that it be impacted

If all of these criteria are met then procedural fairness is triggered and the court will decide what procedures the applicant is due.

== See also ==
- List of Supreme Court of Canada cases
- Canadian administrative law
- Cardinal v. Director of Kent Institution (1986)
