= Suresh v Canada (Minister of Citizenship and Immigration) =

- Supreme Court of Canada

Hearing: May 22, 2001 Judgment: January 11, 2002
- Full case name: Manickavasagam Suresh v The Minister of Citizenship and Immigration and the Attorney General of Canada
- Citations: [2002] 1 S.C.R. 3, 2002 SCC 1

Court membership
- Chief Justice: Beverley McLachlin; Puisne Justices: Claire L'Heureux-Dubé, Charles Gonthier, Frank Iacobucci, John C. Major, Michel Bastarache, Ian Binnie, Louise Arbour, Louis LeBel

Reasons given
- Unanimous decision by: The Court

Suresh v Canada (Minister of Citizenship and Immigration) [2002] 1 S.C.R. 3, 2002 SCC 1 is a leading decision of the Supreme Court of Canada in the areas of constitutional law and administrative law. The Court held that, under the Canadian Charter of Rights and Freedoms, in most circumstances the government cannot deport someone to a country where they risk being tortured, but refugee claimants can be deported to their homelands if they are a serious security risk to Canadians.

== Background ==
Manickavasagam Suresh had come to Canada from his native Sri Lanka in 1990, and had been accepted as a refugee under the United Nations Convention Relating to the Status of Refugees on the basis that his life was in danger in Sri Lanka because of his involvement in the struggle for Tamil independence. In 1995, the government rejected his application for permanent resident status on the basis that he was a security risk, and ordered that he be deported. The Canadian Security Intelligence Service (CSIS) had claimed that he was a supporter and fundraiser for the Liberation Tigers of Tamil Eelam, a terrorist group in Sri Lanka.

The Federal Court of Canada upheld the deportation order. Following this the Minister of Citizenship and Immigration issued an opinion that declared him a danger to the security of Canada under section 53(1)(b) of the Immigration Act and consequently should be deported. Suresh had been given an opportunity to present written and documentary evidence to the Minister, however, he was not provided with a copy of the memorandum of the immigration officer and he consequently was not provided with the opportunity to respond to the memorandum.

Due to this inability to respond Suresh applied for judicial review of the decision. He argued that:

1. the Minister's decision was unreasonable;
2. the procedures of the Immigration Act were unfair;
3. the Immigration Act infringed sections 7, 2(b), and 2(d) of the Charter.

The application was dismissed by the Federal Court. On appeal, the Federal Court of Appeal upheld the decision of the Federal Court, Trial Division. The decision was then appealed to the Supreme Court.

== Ruling of the Court ==
The unanimous decision of the Supreme Court was written By the Court.

=== Section 7 ===
The Court first considered the claim for violation of section 7 of the Charter. The Court agreed that the words "everyone" within the provision included refugees. It was further held that deportation to a country where there is a risk of torture deprives the refugee of their right to liberty and security of person. The primary issue was whether the deprivation was in accordance with the principles of fundamental justice.

The Court found that section 53(1) is constitutional but that it may be unconstitutional in application. The constitutionality of the deportation depends on a balancing of the likelihood of torture and the objective of combating terrorism. The Court identified fundamental justice to be "the basic tenets of our legal system" and are determined by a contextual approach that considers the "nature of the decision to be made." Here, the Court must balance between the government's interests in combating terrorism and the refugee's interest in not being deported to torture. The test proposed by the Court was whether the deprivation would "shock the Canadian conscience". That is, whether "the conduct fundamentally unacceptable to our notions of fair practice and justice" (this test was first developed in Canada v. Schmidt, 1987). The Court found that the Minister should generally decline to deport refugees if there is a substantial risk of torture but that it may be constitutional in exceptional cases. The law is constitutional but administrative decision makers should exercise discretion and usually weigh in favour of the claimant.

The Court also considers the "international perspective" and finds that it too is incompatible with the practice of deportation where there is a risk of torture.

In conclusion, the Court finds that the deportation order given by the Minister to be unconstitutional but the provisions of the Immigration Act are constitutional.

=== Vagueness ===
The second ground of appeal was whether terms "danger to the security of Canada" and "terrorism" were unconstitutionally vague. The Court held that they were not.

Citing R v Nova Scotia Pharmaceutical Society, the Court observes that a vague law will be unconstitutional where it "fails to give those who might come within the ambit of the provision fair notice of the consequences of their conduct" or where "it fails to adequately limit law enforcement discretion." The phrase "danger to the security of Canada" was found not to be vague. The political nature of the term means that the courts should be careful not to interfere. The Court concludes that "danger to the security of Canada" means:

a person constitutes a "danger to the security of Canada" if he or she poses a serious threat to the security of Canada, whether direct or indirect, and bearing in mind the fact that the security of one country is often dependent on the security of other nations. The threat must be "serious", in the sense that it must be grounded on objectively reasonable suspicion based on evidence and in the sense that the threatened harm must be substantial rather than negligible.

As well, the Court finds that the word "terrorism" is not unconstitutionally vague. Though the word has no clear definition, it is possible to set boundaries to the meaning. The Court adopts the definition from the International Convention for the Suppression of the Financing of Terrorism, which defines it as:

an act intended to cause death or serious bodily injury to a civilian, or to any other person not taking an active part in the hostilities in a situation of armed conflict, when the purpose of such act, by its nature or context, is to intimidate a population, or to compel a government or an international organization to do or to abstain from doing any act.

=== Procedural fairness ===
The court applied the five-question framework from Baker to determine the level of procedural protection required by s. 7 of the Charter of Rights and Freedoms in this case. The court finds that Suresh was not owed "a full oral hearing or a complete judicial process." However, the court finds that Suresh was owed a level of procedural protection greater than that required by the act (no protection whatsoever) and greater than that which Suresh received. Specifically, the court found that a person facing deportation to torture under s. 53(1)(b) of the Immigration Act should receive a copy of the material on which the Minister is basing their decision, subject to valid reasons for reduced disclosure such as safeguarding public security documents, and that an opportunity be provided for the person to respond to the case presented to the Minister. Furthermore, the refugee who is being deported has the right to challenge the information of the Minister, including the right to present evidence.

=== Remedy ===
The court finds that because Suresh made a prima facie case that he would be subject to torture upon being returned to Sri Lanka and because he was denied the procedural fairness owed to him by the Canadian Charter of Rights and Freedoms, the case should be returned to the Minister for reconsideration in accordance with proper procedure.

== See also ==
- List of Supreme Court of Canada cases (McLachlin Court)
- Ahani v Canada (Minister of Citizenship and Immigration), [2002] 1 S.C.R. 72; 2002 SCC 2 - accompanying case to Suresh
- Non-refoulement
