= American Corn Growers Association =

- Abbreviation: ACGA
- Formation: 1987
- Headquarters: Washington, D.C.
- Region served: United States
- CEO: Neil Caskey
- Main organ: Board of Directors
- Website: acgf.org

The American Corn Growers Association (ACGA) is a commodity and advocacy association founded in 1987 to represents the interests of corn (maize) producers in the United States, where corn is used for human and animal food and to produce ethanol. A rival group, the National Corn Growers Association, is seen as more closely aligned with the food processing industry.

In 2008, ACGA endorsed Barack Obama's candidacy in the United States presidential elections that year.

== Related groups ==
- Coalition for a Prosperous America
- Organization for Competitive Markets
- National Renewable Energy Laboratory
- National Family Farm Coalition
