= Crevier v Quebec (AG) =

- Supreme Court of Canada

Hearing: February 10, 1981 Judgment: October 20, 1981
- Citations: [1981] 2 SCR 220, 127 DLR (3d) 1
- Ruling: Appeal allowed

Holding
- Any legislation which has a privative clause purporting to exclude review of jurisdictional matters is ultra vires a provincial legislature

Court membership
- Chief Justice: Bora Laskin; Puisne Justices: Ronald Martland, Roland Ritchie, Brian Dickson, Jean Beetz, Willard Estey, William McIntyre, Julien Chouinard, Antonio Lamer

Reasons given
- Unanimous reasons by: Laskin C.J.

Laws applied
- Professional Code, RSQ 1977, c C-26; Constitution Act, 1867

Crevier v Quebec (AG), [1981] 2 S.C.R. 220 is a leading Supreme Court of Canada decision in administrative law. The court had to decide whether a Quebec-created Professionals Tribunal was unconstitutional due to being a "s. 96 court" according to the Constitution Act, 1867, whose members can only be federally appointed. It found that any legislation which has a privative clause purporting to exclude review of jurisdictional matters is outside the jurisdiction of a provincial legislature.

== Facts ==
The decision examined the Professional Code, a Quebec statute which governed 38 professional corporations. The law required each of the corporations to establish a discipline committee in conformity with the code that would examine allegations of professional misconduct.

== Court of Appeal (Quebec) ==
The Quebec Court of Appeal had ruled that the law was not ultra vires the Quebec legislature because it did not create a s. 96 court.

== Supreme Court of Canada ==
Appeal Allowed

The Professions Tribunal is given no function other than that of a general tribunal of appeal in respect of all professions covered by the Professional Code and it was, therefore, impossible to see its final appellate jurisdiction as part of an institutional arrangement by way of a regulatory scheme for governance of the various professions.

Laskin C.J., writing for a unanimous court, held that provincial legislatures had no jurisdiction to impose a privity clause in order to shield its tribunals from judicial review due to s. 96 of the Constitution Act, 1867:

[W]here a provincial Legislature purports to insulate one of its statutory tribunals from any curial review of its adjudicative functions, the insulation encompassing jurisdiction, such provincial legislation must be struck down as unconstitutional by reason of having the effect of constituting the tribunal a s. 96 court.

It is true that this is the first time that this Court has declared unequivocally that a provincially-constituted statutory tribunal cannot constitutionally be immunized from review of decisions on questions of jurisdiction. In my opinion, this limitation, arising by virtue of s. 96, stands on the same footing as the well-accepted limitation on the power of provincial statutory tribunals to make unreviewable determinations of constitutionality. There may be differences of opinion as to what are questions of jurisdiction but, in my lexicon, they rise above and are different from errors of law, whether involving statutory construction or evidentiary matters or other matters. It is now unquestioned that privative clauses may, when properly framed, effectively oust judicial review on questions of law and, indeed, on other issues not touching jurisdiction. However, ... s. 96 is in the British North America Act and ... it would make a mockery of it to treat it in non-functional formal terms as a mere appointing power...

This judgment stood in contrast to CUPE v. New Brunswick Liquor Corp., [1979] 2 SCR 227 decided only two years earlier. In that case, Dickson J., speaking for a unanimous court, called for greater deference to administrative decisions and to place less emphasis on jurisdiction.

== See also ==
- List of Supreme Court of Canada cases (Laskin Court)
