= Union des Employes de Service, Local 298 v Bibeault =

- Supreme Court of Canada

Hearing: October 29, 30, 1986 Judgment: December 22, 1988
- Full case name: Syndicat national des employés de la Commission scolaire régionale de l'Outaouais (CSN) v Union des employés de service, local 298 (FTQ) and Mr. Réal Bibeault and Labour Court
- Ruling: Appeal dismissed

Court membership
- Chief Justice: Brian Dickson; Puisne Justices: Jean Beetz, Willard Estey, William McIntyre, Julien Chouinard, Antonio Lamer, Bertha Wilson, Gerald Le Dain, Gérard La Forest

Reasons given
- Majority: Beetz

Union des Employes de Service, Local 298 v Bibeault, [1988] 2 S.C.R. 1048 is a leading decision of the Supreme Court of Canada on judicial review in Canadian administrative law. In this decision the court first described the "pragmatic and functional approach" to determining the standard of review for an administrative decision and provided reasons for its desirability.

== Background ==
A labour dispute in Quebec occurred over whether a subcontractor had to keep the same benefits as its predecessor. The judgment was the original decision that it did not and was maintained.

== Decision of the Court ==
The court replaced the 'preliminary questions' doctrine found in Syndicat des employés de production du Québec et de l'Acadie v. Canada Labour Relations Board, [1984] 2 S.C.R. 412, with the pragmatic and functional approach. This approach involves several considerations, such as the fact that "the court examines not only the wording of the enactment conferring jurisdiction on the administrative tribunal, but the purpose of the statute creating the tribunal, the reason for its existence, the area of expertise of its members and the nature of the problem before the tribunal."

== See also ==
- List of Supreme Court of Canada cases
- Pushpanathan v Canada (Minister of Citizenship and Immigration)
