= Dunsmuir v New Brunswick =

Canadian Supreme Court case

- Supreme Court of Canada

Hearing: May 15, 2007 Judgment: March 7, 2008
- Full case name: David Dunsmuir v. Her Majesty the Queen in Right of the Province of New Brunswick as represented by Board of Management
- Citations: 2008 SCC 9, [2008] 1 SCR 190
- Prior history: APPEAL from Dunsmuir v. Her Majesty the Queen in Right of the Province of New Brunswick, as represented by the Board of Management, 2006 NBCA 27 (23 March 2006), affirming New Brunswick v. Dunsmuir, 2005 NBQB 270 (4 August 2005), quashing a preliminary ruling and quashing in part an award made by an adjudicator.
- Ruling: Appeal Dismissed

Holding
- Correctness and reasonableness should be the only two standards of judicial review with respect to decision-making. The correctness standard will apply with respect of jurisdictional and some other questions of law, and the reasonableness standard is concerned mostly with the existence of justification, transparency, and intelligibility within the decision‑making process and with whether the decision falls within a range of possible acceptable outcomes which are defensible in respect of the facts and the law. If the question is one of fact, discretion, or policy or the legal issue is intertwined with and cannot be readily separated from the factual issue, deference by the court will usually apply automatically with respect to the decision made.

Court membership
- Chief Justice: Beverley McLachlin; Puisne Justices: Michel Bastarache, Ian Binnie, Louis LeBel, Marie Deschamps, Morris Fish, Rosalie Abella, Louise Charron, Marshall Rothstein

Reasons given
- Majority: Bastarache and LeBel JJ, joined by McLachlin CJ, Fish and Abella JJ
- Concurrence: Binnie J
- Concurrence: Deschamps J, joined by Charron and Rothstein JJ

Dunsmuir v New Brunswick [2008] 1 SCR 190, 2008 SCC 9 was, prior to Canada (Minister of Citizenship and Immigration) v Vavilov, the leading Supreme Court of Canada decision on the topic of substantive review and standards of review. Dunsmuir is notable for combining the reasonableness (simpliciter) and the patent unreasonableness standards of review into a single reasonableness standard.

== Facts ==
David Dunsmuir was hired by the Department of Justice of the Province of New Brunswick as of February 25, 2002. His work was unsatisfactory to his employer and he received multiple written notices to this effect. Ultimately, his employer decided to terminate his employment as of December 31, 2004. On August 19, 2004, Dunsmuir was informed in a letter that his employment was being terminated. As his employment was not being terminated "for cause," Dunsmuir was granted several months of paid leave with which to find a new job.

Dunsmuir grieved his dismissal in a letter sent to the Deputy Minister on September 1, 2004. When his grievance was denied, he gave notice that he would refer the grievance to adjudication. An adjudicator was selected by the agreement of both parties. The adjudicator held that Dunsmuir had been denied procedural fairness in the manner of his dismissal and that the dismissal was thus void ab initio. The adjudicator ordered Dunsmuir to be reinstated as of August 19, 2004. On judicial review to the Court of Queen's Bench, the decision was overturned. That decision eventually reached the Supreme Court of Canada.

== History ==
=== Trial Court ===
The trial court took an application for judicial review and decided that the correct standard of review was correctness against the adjudicator's decision because the adjudicator did not have jurisdiction to inquire. The court decided that Dunsmuir received procedural fairness because of the hearing before the adjudicator and maintained the eight-month decision.

=== Court of Appeal ===
The Court of Appeal decided that reasonableness was the correct standard and that the adjudicator was unreasonable because the employer dismissed the employee at pleasure, and the common law rules did not require any more procedural fairness than Dunsmuir had received.

== Decision ==
=== Statement of law ===
The Court began by canvassing the recent history of administrative law decisions on the standard of review, including Canadian Union of Public Employees, Local 963 v New Brunswick Liquor Corp, Crevier v Quebec (AG), Canada (Director of Investigation and Research) v Southam Inc and Pushpanathan v Canada (Minister of Citizenship and Immigration). The Court noted the general unworkability of the current state of the judicial review of administrative decisions in Canada. In response, the Court decided to dispense with having three standards of review: correctness, reasonableness (simpliciter), and patent unreasonableness. Instead, the court decided that there would be only two standards: correctness and reasonableness. Additionally, the decision to apply a correctness standard would no longer be based on "jurisdictional" issues.

The Court emphasized the use of precedent to simplify the issue of standard of review. Firstly, courts must ascertain whether the jurisprudence has already determined in a satisfactory manner the degree of deference to be accorded with regard to a particular category of question. Secondly, if the first inquiry proves unfruitful, courts must proceed to an analysis of the factors making it possible to identify the proper standard of review:

[50] As important as it is that courts have a proper understanding of reasonableness review as a deferential standard, it is also without question that the standard of correctness must be maintained in respect of jurisdictional and some other questions of law. This promotes just decisions and avoids inconsistent and unauthorized application of law. When applying the correctness standard, a reviewing court will not show deference to the decision maker’s reasoning process; it will rather undertake its own analysis of the question. The analysis will bring the court to decide whether it agrees with the determination of the decision maker; if not, the court will substitute its own view and provide the correct answer. From the outset, the court must ask whether the tribunal’s decision was correct.

[51] Having dealt with the nature of the standards of review, we now turn our attention to the method for selecting the appropriate standard in individual cases. As we will now demonstrate, questions of fact, discretion and policy as well as questions where the legal issues cannot be easily separated from the factual issues generally attract a standard of reasonableness while many legal issues attract a standard of correctness. Some legal issues, however, attract the more deferential standard of reasonableness.

...

[55] A consideration of the following factors will lead to the conclusion that the decision maker should be given deference and a reasonableness test applied:

— A privative clause: this is a statutory direction from Parliament or a legislature indicating the need for deference.

— A discrete and special administrative regime in which the decision maker has special expertise (labour relations for instance).

— The nature of the question of law. A question of law that is of "central importance to the legal system . . . and outside the . . . specialized area of expertise" of the administrative decision maker will always attract a correctness standard (Toronto (City) v. C.U.P.E., at para. 62). On the other hand, a question of law that does not rise to this level may be compatible with a reasonableness standard where the two above factors so indicate.

[56] If these factors, considered together, point to a standard of reasonableness, the decision maker’s decision must be approached with deference in the sense of respect discussed earlier in these reasons. There is nothing unprincipled in the fact that some questions of law will be decided on the basis of reasonableness. It simply means giving the adjudicator’s decision appropriate deference in deciding whether a decision should be upheld, bearing in mind the factors indicated.

The following matters were identified as being subject to the correctness standard:

- constitutional questions regarding the division of powers between Parliament and the provinces
- determinations of true questions of jurisdiction or vires
- the question at issue is one of general law "that is both of central importance to the legal system as a whole and outside the adjudicator’s specialized area of expertise"
- questions regarding the jurisdictional lines between two or more competing specialized tribunals

=== Application to facts ===
When the new analytical framework was applied to the facts of Dunsmuir, the Court determined that the reasonableness standard was the correct approach on which to judge the administrative decision in question. In that regard, the Court ruled that the decision failed to meet that standard and was therefore unreasonable.

== Impact ==
The ruling has consolidated the law relating to standards of judicial review in Canada and has effectively required a full standard of review analysis to be performed in all current disputes arising from administrative decisions. Dunsmuir does not stand for the proposition that the "adequacy" of reasons is a stand‑alone basis for quashing a decision or as advocating that a reviewing court undertake two discrete analyses: one for the reasons and a separate one for the result. It is a more organic exercise; the reasons must be read together with the outcome and serve the purpose of showing whether the result falls within a range of possible outcomes.

The Dunsmuir principles were subsequently clarified in Canada (Minister of Citizenship and Immigration) v Khosa, in which Binnie J commented:

Dunsmuir teaches that judicial review should be less concerned with the formulation of different standards of review and more focussed on substance, particularly on the nature of the issue that was before the administrative tribunal under review.

However, Dunsmuir will not overrule specific requirements that are given in a statutory framework; therefore, the duty of procedural fairness will continue to apply in such cases.

The presumption of reasonableness in administrative review suggested by Binnie J in Dunsmuir did not find majority support at the time but has since been accepted by the Supreme Court in other cases. That presumption of reasonableness has since led to a more deferent view being taken by courts in Canada in reviewing administrative decisions.

In addition, the ruling has effectively ensured that most forms of public employment are best viewed through the lens of private employment law principles, irrespective of whether the affected person may be categorized as a public office holder. Therefore, appeals on grounds of procedural fairness will be available only to a few categories of public employment, and reinstatement procedures will occur even less frequently.

In June 2018, the Supreme Court found that the Canadian Human Rights Tribunal's determination that the Indian Act did not violate the Canadian Human Rights Act was reasonable. Three concurring justices argued that the context instead required review for correctness.

== See also ==
- List of Supreme Court of Canada cases (McLachlin Court)
- List of Supreme Court of Canada cases
