= Standard of review =

Amount of discretion an appellate court applies to overturning a lower court's decision

In law, the standard of review is the amount of deference given by one court (or some other appellate tribunal) in reviewing a decision of a lower court or tribunal. A low standard of review means that the decision under review will be varied or overturned if the reviewing court considers there is any error at all in the lower court's decision. A high standard of review means that deference is accorded to the decision under review, so that it will not be disturbed just because the reviewing court might have decided the matter differently; it will be varied only if the higher court considers the decision to have obvious error. The standard of review may be set by statute or precedent (stare decisis). In the United States, "standard of review" also has a separate meaning concerning the level of deference the judiciary gives to Congress when ruling on the constitutionality of legislation.

== United States ==
In the United States, the term "standard of review" has several different meanings in different contexts and thus there are several standards of review on appeal used in federal courts depending on the nature of the question being appealed and the body that made the decision.

=== Questions of fact ===
==== Arbitrary and capricious ====
Arbitrary and capricious is a legal ruling wherein an appellate court determines that a previous ruling is invalid because it was made on unreasonable grounds or without any proper consideration of circumstances. This is an extremely deferential standard. In administrative law, a government agency's resolution of a question of fact, when decided pursuant to an informal rulemaking under the Administrative Procedure Act (APA), is reviewed on the arbitrary and capricious standard.

==== Substantial evidence ====
A finding of fact made by a jury or an administrative agency in the context of APA adjudication or formal rulemaking will be normally upheld on appeal unless it is unsupported by "substantial evidence." This means something "more than a mere scintilla" of evidence. It means such relevant evidence as a reasonable mind might accept as adequate to support a conclusion." Under the "substantial evidence" standard, appellate review extends to whether there is any relevant evidence in the record which reasonably supports every material fact (that is, material in the sense of establishing an essential element of a claim or defense). Appellate courts will not reverse such findings of fact unless they have no reasonable basis in the evidence submitted by the parties. In other words, they will not reverse unless no one submitted any testimony, documentation, or other evidence which directly or indirectly (i.e., through reasonable inferences) supports a material fact, thereby implying that the finder of fact must have engaged in impermissible speculation with no reasonable basis in order to reach a verdict. If the parties presented conflicting evidence, appellate courts applying a "substantial evidence" standard assume that the jury or administrative adjudicator resolved the conflict in favor of the prevailing party, and in turn, appellate courts must defer to such implicit findings about which side's witnesses or documents were more believable, even if they suspect they might have ruled differently if hearing the evidence themselves in the first instance. This is a highly deferential standard.

==== Clearly erroneous ====
Under the "clearly erroneous" standard, where a trial court (as opposed to a jury or administrative agency) makes a finding of fact, such as in a bench trial, that finding will not be disturbed unless the appellate court is left with a "definite and firm conviction that a mistake has been committed" by the lower court. For example, if a trial court finds, based on the testimony of a single eyewitness, that a defendant broke a window by throwing a 30-pound rock over 100 feet, the appeals court might reverse that factual finding based on uncontradicted expert testimony (also presented to the trial court) stating that such a feat is impossible for most people. In such a case, the appeals court might find that, although there was evidence to support the lower court's finding, the evidence taken as a whole—including the eyewitness and the expert testimony—leaves the appellate court with a definite and firm conviction that a mistake was committed by the trial court.

=== Questions of law ===
==== De novo ====
Under de novo review, the appellate court acts as if it were considering the question for the first time, giving no deference to the decision below. This standard applies to a lower court's findings on questions of law. This is sometimes referred to as "plenary review" or the "legal error" standard. It allows the appeals court to substitute its own judgment for the lower court's on how to apply the law. For example, as noted in Bose Corp. v. Consumers Union of United States, Inc., de novo review is required in the United States when First Amendment issues are raised on appeal. Questions of statutory interpretation decided by an administrative agency in a manner that has the force of law used to be subject to Chevron review until Chevron was overturned by Loper Bright Enterprises v. Raimondo. Questions of statutory interpretation decided by an agency in a manner that does not have the force of law are subject to Skidmore review.

A new trial in which all issues are reviewed as if for the first time is called a trial de novo.

=== Mixed questions of law and fact ===
Court and jury decisions concerning mixed questions of law and fact are usually subjected to de novo review, unless factual issues predominate, in which event the decision will be subject to clearly erroneous review. When made by administrative agencies, decisions concerning mixed questions of law and fact are subjected to arbitrary and capricious review.

Additionally, in some areas of substantive law, such as when a court is reviewing a First Amendment issue, an appellate court will use a standard of review called "independent review." The standard is somewhere in between de novo review and clearly erroneous review. Under independent review, an appellate court will reexamine the record from the lower court as the appellate court makes its legal determinations.

=== Questions of judicial oversight ===
==== Abuse of discretion ====
Where a lower court has made a discretionary ruling (such as whether to allow a party claiming a hardship to file a brief after the deadline), that decision will be reviewed for abuse of discretion. It will not be reversed unless the decision is "plain error". One consideration is whether "unpreserved" error exists—that is, mistakes made by the lower court that were not objected to as the law requires. In such a case, the appellate court may still choose to look at the lower court's mistake even though there was no objection, if the appellate court determines that the error was evident, obvious, and clear and materially prejudiced a substantial right, meaning that it was likely that the mistake affected the outcome of the case below in a significant way.

In federal court, if a party commits forfeiture of error, e.g. by failing to raise a timely objection, then on appeal, the burden of proof is on that party to show that plain error occurred. If the party did raise a timely objection that was overruled, then on appeal, the burden of proof is on the other party to show that the error was harmless error. This approach is dictated by Federal Rule of Criminal Procedure 52, which holds, "[a]ny error, defect, irregularity, or variance that does not affect substantial rights must be disregarded, [while a] plain error that affects substantial rights may be considered even though it was not brought to the court's attention." The appellate court has discretion as to whether or not to correct plain error. Usually the court will not correct it unless it led to a brazen miscarriage of justice.

=== Questions of constitutionality ===
Questions of constitutionality are considered a type of question of law, and thus appellate courts always review lower court decisions that address constitutional issues de novo. However, the term "standard of review" has an additional meaning in the context of reviewing a law for its constitutionality, which concerns how much deference the judiciary should give the legislature (i.e., the federal Congress or state legislatures) in determining whether legislation is constitutional. Concerning constitutional questions, three basic standards of review exist: rational basis, intermediate scrutiny, and strict scrutiny. This form of standard of review is sometimes also called the standard or level of scrutiny.

These levels of scrutiny are normally applied to legislation, but can also be applied to judicial acts and precedents (as seen in the context of challenges to the constitutionality of awards of punitive damages). In other words, the common law (including case law) is not immune to at least some minimal amount of judicial review for compatibility with the federal Constitution.

==== Rational basis ====
Generally, the Supreme Court judges legislation based on whether it has a reasonable relationship to a legitimate state interest. This is called rational basis review. For example, a statute requiring the licensing of opticians is permissible because it is directed to the legitimate state objective of ensuring the health of consumers, and the licensing statutes are reasonably related to ensuring consumers' health by requiring certain education for opticians.

==== Intermediate scrutiny ====
Under the Equal Protection Clause, when the law targets a "quasi-suspect" classification, such as gender, the courts apply intermediate scrutiny, which requires the law to be substantially related to an important government interest. As the name implies, it is more strict than rational basis review but less strict than strict scrutiny.

Other forms of intermediate scrutiny are applied in other contexts. For example, under the Free Speech Clause, content-neutral time, place, and manner restrictions on speech are subject to a form of intermediate scrutiny.

==== Strict scrutiny ====
If a statute impinges on a fundamental right, such as those listed in the Bill of Rights or the due process rights of the Fourteenth Amendment, then the court will apply strict scrutiny. This means the statute must be "narrowly tailored" to address a "compelling state interest." The courts will also apply strict scrutiny if the law targets a suspect classification, such as race.

== Canada ==
Judicial review in Canada of a decision of a tribunal, board, commission or other government decision-maker applies one of several standards, depending on the circumstances. In each case, a court must undertake a "standard of review analysis" to determine the appropriate standard to apply. Where the relevant statute provides for an appeal to the courts, questions of law are subject to a standard of "correctness" and questions of fact and mixed fact and law subject to the standard of "palpable and overriding error". These standards correspond to those applied on appeals from lower court decisions. Where the government decision-maker's decision is reviewed by way of judicial review, the relevant standard for all questions is generally "reasonableness".

== See also ==
- Appeal
- Judicial review
- Administrative law
  - United States administrative law
  - Canadian administrative law
    - Baker v Canada (Minister of Citizenship and Immigration) (1998)
    - Dunsmuir v New Brunswick (2008)
    - Canada (Minister of Citizenship and Immigration) v Vavilov (2019)
- Rational basis review
- Intermediate scrutiny
- Strict scrutiny
- Undue burden standard
