= Canadian administrative law =

Law governing the government agencies of Canada

Canadian administrative law is the body of law "that applies to all administrative decisions, whether issued by front-line officials, ministers, economic regulatory agencies, or administrative tribunals, with interpretations of law and exercises of discretion subject to the same . . . rules." Administrative law is concerned primarily with ensuring that administrative decision-makers remain within the boundaries of their authority (substantive review) and observe procedural fairness (rights for those affected by the decision to participate in the decision-making process).

== Sources of law ==
The powers of an administrative decision-maker ("ADM") are primarily created by statute, which is known as the "enabling statute". These powers are limited by the legislative authority of the enabling government provided under section 91 or 92 of the Constitution Act, 1867. Superior Courts (known as Section 96 Courts) have an inherent power at common law to review any decision of an ADM. A judicial review allows for the court to consider the entire decision-making process, including the process, the findings of fact and of law. The power of judicial review is found either in the enabling statute or by virtue of the common law. The common law powers are derived from the four original writs of certiorari, prohibition, mandamus and habeas corpus.

These powers are also frequently limited by privative clauses or finality clauses within the enabling statute. As established in Crevier v Quebec (AG), the Constitution requires that the courts be able to supervise errors of ADMs and so the legislature cannot completely oust the courts from that power, nor can an ADM completely supplant the courts role. Where a privative clause provides a limited right of appeal, the courts may exercise the discretion to grant judicial review only where the right of appeal fails to provide an adequate alternative remedy.

== Appellate review ==
Courts may review a decision through a statutory appeal when such appeal is explicitly provided by the enabling statute that created the administrative body. The scope of such appeal is defined and described by the terms of the enabling statute.

In Canada (Minister of Citizenship and Immigration) v Vavilov, the Supreme Court of Canada held that where a statute provides for an appeal from an administrative decision to a court, it has subjected the administrative regime to appellate oversight and indicated that it expects the court to scrutinize such administrative decisions on an appellate basis.

A court hearing such an appeal must apply appellate standards of review to the administrative decision. This means that when considering questions of law raised in the appeal, the court would apply the standard of correctness. When reviewing questions of fact (or questions of mixed fact and law when the legal principle is not readily extricable), the court applies the standard of "palpable and overriding error". The legislature is free to deviate from this appellate standard of review by prescribing a different standard in the applicable statute.

== Substantive review ==
When performing substantive review, formally a judicial review, the court considers the merits of an administrative decision and determines if the decision is so defective that it should be remitted for reconsideration.

=== Standards of review ===
==== Historical practice (pre-Vavilov) ====
Prior to the landmark decision of Canada (Minister of Citizenship and Immigration) v Vavilov, 2019 SCC 65, courts would undertake highly-contextual standard of review analyses. A court would consider precedents, the relative expertise of the decision maker in question, the nature of the issue in dispute and the content and context of the governing legislation. Reasoning from these factors, the court would determine the level of scrutiny that it would apply in the review of the particular administrative decision in issue.

In Vavilov, the Supreme Court of Canada explicitly did away with the contextual analysis for standard of review previously established, in an effort to streamline and simplify the standard of review framework. In so doing, the Supreme Court of Canada sought to give greater effect and meaning to the express statutory right of appeal, which is understood to be the key factor representing legislative intention on the standard of review to be applied in judicial review of an administrative decision. The presence of an express statutory right of appeal in the enabling statute is understood to mean that the legislature intended the courts to play an appellate role, and apply a less deferential standard of review. Concomitantly, it is presumed from the lack of a statutory of appeal that the Legislature intended the courts to apply a more deferential standard of review, namely, the standard of reasonableness. It is unnecessary to undertake a separate analytical framework to decide what standard of review should apply.

==== Current practice (post-Vavilov) ====
There are two standards of review available to courts: reasonableness and correctness. A third standard of review, patent unreasonableness, was previously abolished in Dunsmuir (though it still exists as a standard where provided for by provincial legislation; e.g., the British Columbia Administrative Tribunals Act).

The standard of reasonableness is the default and presumptive standard of review that applies to all administrative decisions. This presumption may be rebutted in two situations: (i) where the legislation has indicated that a standard of correctness applies, and (ii) where the rule of law requires that the standard of correctness applies. The second situation is engaged for certain categories of questions, such as constitutional questions, general questions of law of central importance to the legal system as a whole and questions related to the jurisdictional boundaries between two or more administrative bodies.

==== Reasonableness ====
Reasonableness is the deferential standard of review that presumptively applies to all administrative decisions. Reasonableness review focuses on the decision actually made by the decision maker, including both the decision maker's reasoning process and the outcome. The reviewing court must refrain from deciding the issue themselves, and must consider only whether the decision made by the administrative decision maker, including both its rationale and outcome, was unreasonable.

In particular, the reviewing court asks whether the decision bears the hallmarks of reasonableness — justification, transparency and intelligibility — and whether it is justified in relation to the relevant factual and legal constraints that bear on the decision. A reasonable decision is one that is based on an internally coherent and rational chain of analysis and that is justified in relation to the facts and law that constrain the decision maker.

Any shortcomings or flaws relied on by the party challenging the decision must be sufficiently central or significant to render the decision unreasonable. In Vavilov, the Supreme Court of Canada gave, as example, two types of fundamental flaws in an administrative decision. First is a failure of rationality internal to the reasoning process. The second arises when a decision is in some respect untenable in light of the relevant factual and legal constraints that bear on it.

Reasonableness review is not a line-by-line treasure hunt for error, but the reviewing court must be able to trace the decision maker's reasoning without encountering any fatal flaws in its overarching logic, and there must be a line of analysis within the given reasons that could reasonably lead the tribunal from the evidence before it to the conclusion at which it arrived.

A decision must also be justified in relation to the constellation of law and facts that are relevant to the decision. A reviewing court may find a decision unreasonable when it is examined against contextual considerations such as the governing statutory scheme; other relevant statutory or common law; the principles of statutory interpretation; the evidence before the decision maker and facts of which the decision maker may take notice; the submissions of the parties; the past practices and decisions of the administrative body; and the potential impact of the decision on the individual to whom it applies.

The reviewing court must refrain from “reweighing and reassessing the evidence considered by the decision maker”. However, the reasonableness of a decision may be jeopardized where the decision maker has fundamentally misapprehended or failed to account for the evidence before it.

In Vavilov, the Supreme Court of Canada recognized that the review of reasonableness may be challenging in contexts where formal reasons have not been, and are not required to be provided for a decision. Nonetheless, the reviewing court must look to the record as a whole to understand the decision, and in doing so, the court will often uncover a clear rationale for the decision. When no reasons have been provided and neither the record nor the larger context sheds light on the basis for the decision, the reviewing court must still examine the decision in light of the relevant constraints on the decision maker in order to determine whether the decision is reasonable.

==== Correctness ====
Correctness is the less deferential standard that a court can give to an administrative decision maker. The court will give no deference at all and will judge the decision on the basis of whether it is correct in law. A court may substitute its own opinion for that of the decision maker. Certain matters have been held by the court to always warrant a correctness standard: questions of constitutional law and division of powers, a "true question of jurisdiction" (in determining whether an administrative decision-maker has properly exercised its authority granted under a statute), questions of general law that are both of central importance to the legal system as a whole and outside the adjudicator's specialized area of expertise, and questions regarding jurisdictional lines between two or more competing specialized tribunals.

==== Patent unreasonableness ====
The standard of "patent unreasonableness" was abolished by the Supreme Court of Canada in Dunsmuir.

Patent unreasonableness was the highest level of deference that the court could previously give to a decision maker, before it was abolished. This standard was found to be dissatisfactory as it allowed certain decisions that were unreasonable but not patently unreasonable to be upheld, giving rise to situations where individuals had to accept a decision of an administrative body that is nonetheless unreasonable.

A number of provincial statutes, most notably British Columbia's Administrative Tribunals Act, continue to adopt the patent unreasonableness standard. Because a statute is superior to common law, the patent unreasonableness standard is applicable when courts apply these statutes

== Procedural fairness ==
Procedural fairness concerns the rights of individuals affected by a decision to participate in that decision making process. These procedural rights flow from two principles of natural justice: the right to be heard (audi alteram partem) and right to be judged impartially (nemo judex in sua causa). The source of these rights can be found in the Canadian Charter of Rights and Freedoms, general legislation that governs administrative decision making, an administrative decision maker's enabling legislation, and the common law.

=== Legitimate expectation ===
Legitimate expectation of procedural fairness applies:"When a public authority had promised to follow a certain procedure, it is in the interest of good administration that it should act fairly and should implement its promise, so long as implementation does not interfere with its statutory duty." In this way the courts have found procedural fairness through a promise by an administrative decision-maker. There are requirements for what constitutes a legitimate expectation. The test is:

1. A public authority makes a promise,
2. That promise is to follow a certain procedure,
3. In respect to an interested person, and
4. They relied and acted upon that promise

According to Canadian Union of Public Employees v Ontario (Minister of Labour), if the promise is clear, unambiguous and unqualified representation as to a procedure, then it creates a legitimate expectation. This applies also to an established practice or conduct of a given decision-maker. Legitimate expectation will not apply to legislative decisions, promises that conflict with statutory duties, and substantive promises.

=== Duty of fairness ===
The common law imposes a minimum duty of fairness in certain administrative proceedings. The duty can only be invoked where the circumstances satisfy a threshold based on three factors set out by the Supreme Court in Knight v Indian Head School Division No 19.

- First, the nature of the decision must be sufficiently administrative.Furthermore, the decisions must not be preliminary or interlocutory.
- Second, the relationship between the (public) body and the individual must be based on an exercise of power pursuant to a statute (or prerogative power).
- Third, the decision must affect the claimant's rights, privileges or interests.

Where the circumstances satisfy the threshold test to invoke a duty of fairness a claimant will be entitled to certain participatory rights including pre-hearing rights, such as rights related notice, disclosure, discovery, and delay, as well as hearing rights, such as rights related to the form of hearing, counsel, examinations, and reasons for judgment.

=== Content of Duty of Fairness: Baker Test ===
Baker v Canada (Minister of Citizenship and Immigration) clarified administrative law in Canada in relation to both substantive matters (discretionary decision making) and procedural matters (procedural fairness).

The content of the duty of fairness depends on the type of right and the circumstances of the case. There are five factors that affect the content of this duty:

1. The nature of the decision. It asks whether the decision is more for the purpose of resolving dispute, protecting individual rights or some other judicial purpose rather than a decision that balances many interests and primarily considers policy.
2. The statutory scheme under which the decision is made. This primarily focuses on whether the decision is final and conclusive or if it is preliminary or if there is a right of appeal.
3. The importance of the interest at stake in the decision relative to other interests.
4. The legitimate expectations of the parties based on whether there were any representations by word or conduct that lead the parties to believe there was some type of procedural protection.
5. The procedural choices available to the ADM. The ADM must be accorded some deference to its practices and policies necessary to accomplish its mandate.

With respect to discretion, historically, the standard of review for discretionary decisions applied by the courts was that of correctness. However, this changed in Baker where the Supreme Court of Canada emphasized the awkward line between questions of law and discretion. The court recognized that the 'pragmatic and functional' approach, as outlined in Pushpanathan, should be applied when looking at issues of discretion. In addition, courts are able to apply a standard of reasonableness to discretionary decision making.

=== Bias and independence ===
Administrative tribunals must be free from an appearance of bias - that is, a reasonable person must conclude that an administrative decision-maker is sufficiently free of factors that could interfere with the ability to make impartial judgments (commonly known as the "reasonable apprehension of bias" test). This is derived from the natural justice principle of nemo judex in sua causa, or the right to be judged impartially. Traditionally, the exercise of discretionary powers is reviewable on a variety of bases, such as improper purposes, irrelevant considerations, fettering of discretion, subdelegation and bad faith. A decision which falls within these grounds may also be considered per se unreasonable.

Although administrative independence is not required to be as strict as judicial independence, there are still certain minimum requirements such as security of tenure and independent administrative control. Common law principles of fairness may be ousted or overruled by the legislature “by clear and explicit language.” However, when confronted with silent or ambiguous legislation, courts generally infer that Parliament or the legislature intended the tribunal’s process to comport with principles of fairness and natural justice. Because administrative tribunals perform a variety of functions, they “may be seen as spanning the constitutional divide between the executive and judicial branches of government.” Some administrative tribunals are closer to the executive end of the spectrum: their primary purpose is to develop, or supervise the implementation of, particular government policies. Such tribunals may require little by way of procedural protections. Other tribunals, however, are closer to the judicial end of the spectrum: their primary purpose is to adjudicate disputes through some form of hearing. Tribunals at this end of the spectrum may possess court-like powers and procedures. These powers may bring with them stringent requirements of procedural fairness, including a higher requirement of independence.

Once a court has determined that there has been a reasonable apprehension of bias, the decision in question must be void ab initio, as the legal prejudice created by the apprehension of bias cannot be remedied.

== Sources ==
- Daly, Paul (2023). A Culture of Justification: Vavilov and the Future of Administrative Law. UBC Press. ISBN 978-0-7748-6909-6.

== See also ==
- Canada (Minister of Citizenship and Immigration) v Vavilov, 2019 SCC 65
- Mason v Canada (Citizenship and Immigration), 2023 SCC 21
