= Ouster clause =

Type of clause in legislation

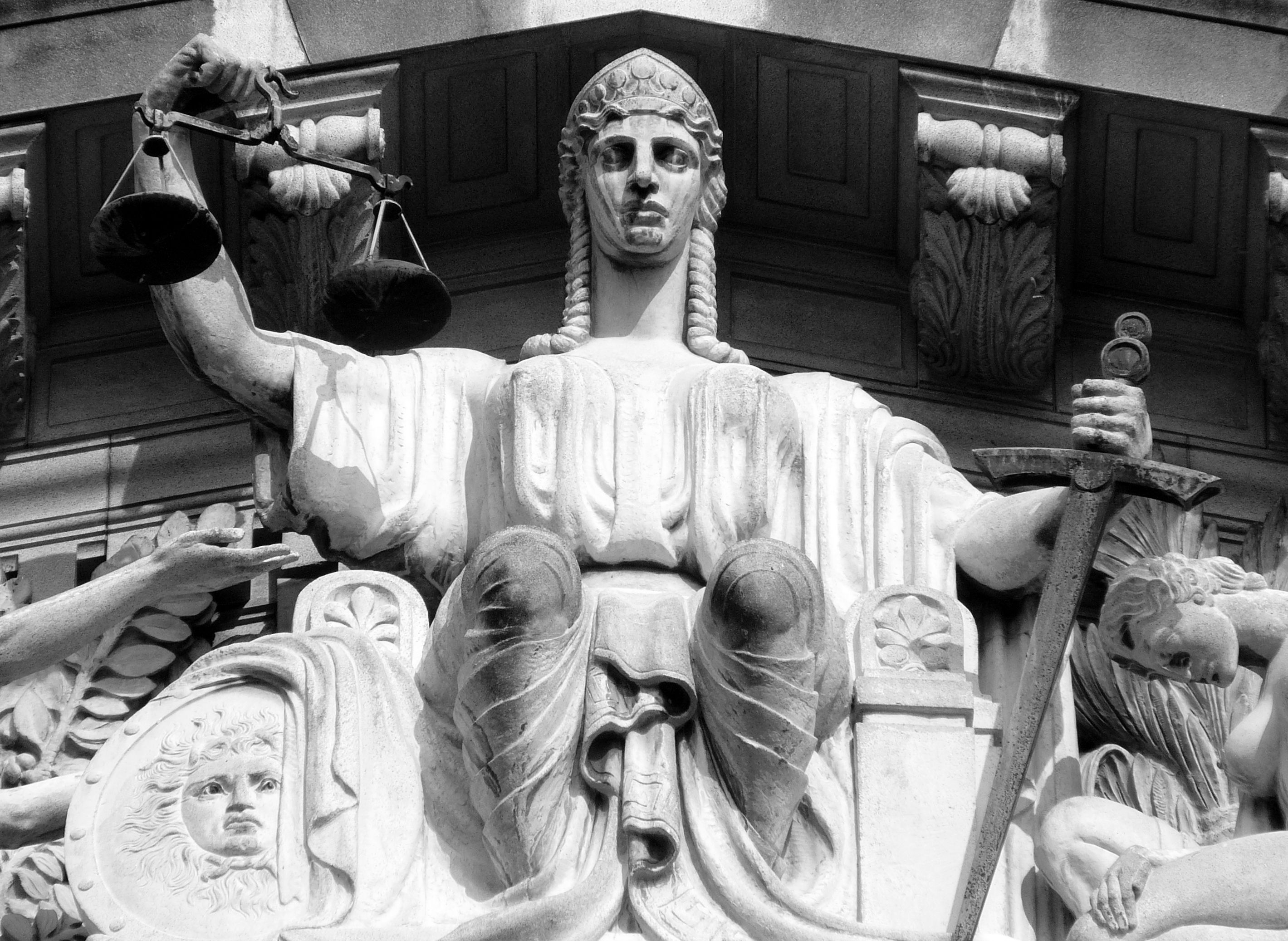
A sculpture of Lady Justice in the tympanum of the Old Supreme Court Building in Singapore. Ouster clauses seek to exclude courts from reviewing actions and decisions of the executive branch of government.

An ouster clause or privative clause is, in countries with common law legal systems, a clause or provision included in a piece of legislation by a legislative body to exclude judicial review of acts and decisions of the executive by stripping the courts of their supervisory judicial function. According to the doctrine of the separation of powers, one of the important functions of the judiciary is to keep the executive in check by ensuring that its acts comply with the law, including, where applicable, the constitution. Ouster clauses prevent courts from carrying out this function, but may be justified on the ground that they preserve the powers of the executive and promote the finality of its acts and decisions.

Ouster clauses may be divided into two species – total ouster clauses and partial ouster clauses. In the United Kingdom, the effectiveness of total ouster clauses is fairly limited. In the case of Anisminic Ltd. v. Foreign Compensation Committee (1968), the House of Lords held that ouster clauses cannot prevent the courts from examining an executive decision that, due to an error of law, is a nullity. Subsequent cases held that Anisminic had abolished the distinction between jurisdictional and non-jurisdictional errors of law. Thus, although prior to Anisminic an ouster clause was effective in preventing judicial review where only a non-jurisdictional error of law was involved, following that case ouster clauses do not prevent courts from dealing with both jurisdictional and non-jurisdictional errors of law, except in a number of limited situations.

The High Court of Australia has held that the Constitution of Australia restricts the ability of legislatures to insulate administrative tribunals from judicial review using privative clauses.

Similarly, in India ouster clauses are almost always ineffective because judicial review is regarded as part of the basic structure of the constitution that cannot be excluded.

The position in Singapore is unclear. Two cases decided after Anisminic have maintained the distinction between jurisdictional and non-jurisdictional errors of law, and it is not yet known whether the courts will eventually adopt the legal position in the United Kingdom. The Chief Justice of Singapore, Chan Sek Keong, suggested in a 2010 lecture that ouster clauses may be inconsistent with Article 93 of the constitution, which vests judicial power in the courts, and may thus be void. However, he emphasized that he was not expressing a concluded view on the matter.

In contrast with total ouster clauses, courts in the United Kingdom have affirmed the validity of partial ouster clauses that specify a time period after which aggrieved persons can no longer apply to the courts for a remedy.

== Background ==
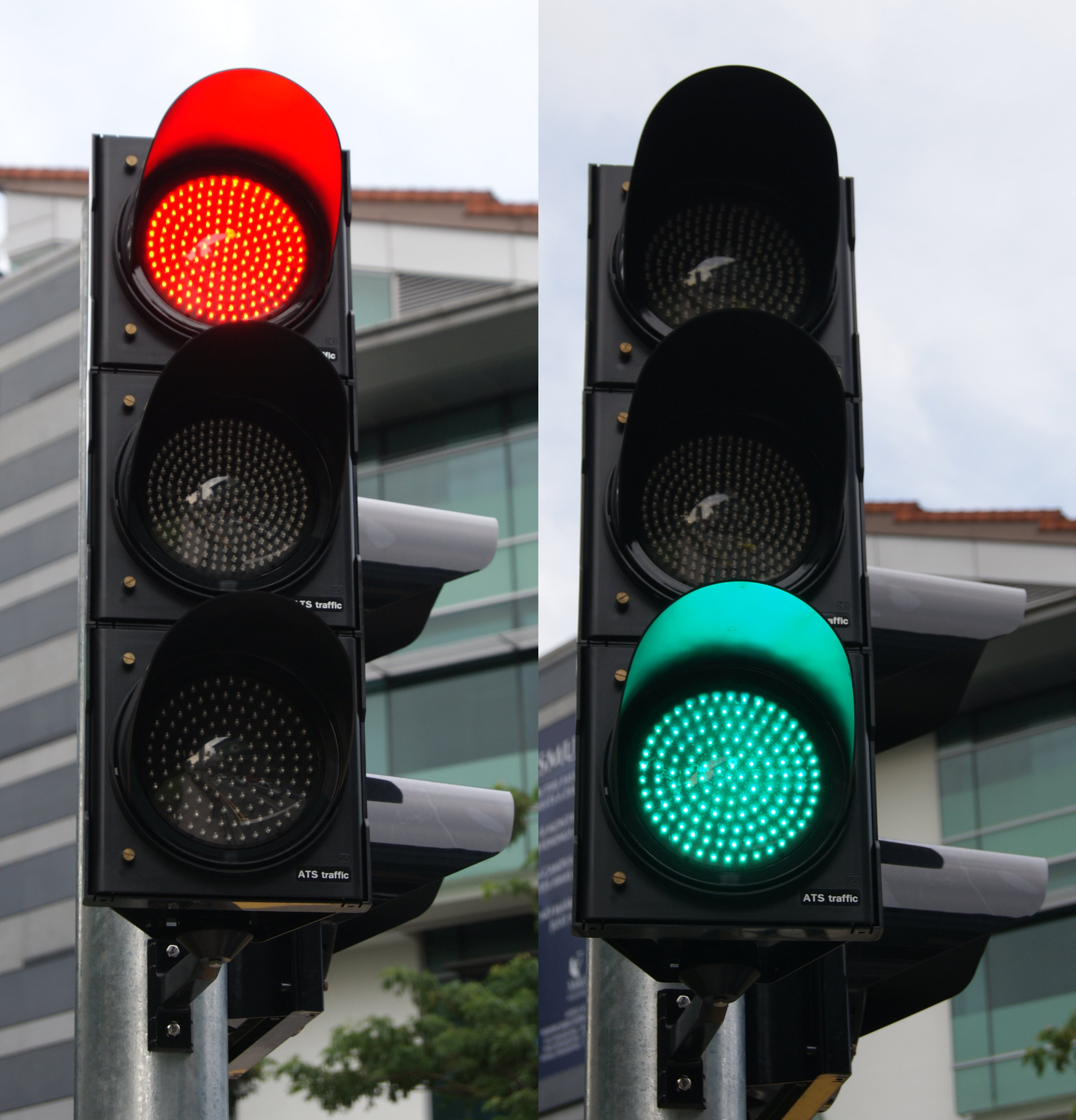
Traffic signals along Stamford Road, Singapore. The effectiveness of an ouster clause may depend on whether a particular jurisdiction adopts the red-light or green-light theory of administrative law.

According to the Diceyan model of separation of powers, the executive of a state governs according to a framework of general rules in society established by the legislature, and the judiciary ensures that the executive acts within the confines of these rules through judicial review. In general, under both constitutional and administrative law, the courts possess supervisory jurisdiction over the exercise of executive power. When carrying out judicial review of administrative action, the court scrutinizes the legality and not the substantive merits of an act or decision made by a public authority under the three broad headings of illegality, irrationality and procedural impropriety (Council of Civil Service Unions v Minister for the Civil Service). In jurisdictions which have a written constitution, the courts also assess the constitutionality of legislation, executive actions and governmental policy. Therefore, part of the role of the judiciary is to ensure that public authorities act lawfully and to serve as a check and balance on the government's power. However, the legislature may attempt to exclude the jurisdiction of the courts by the inclusion of ouster clauses in the statutes empowering public authorities to act and make decisions. These ouster clauses may be total or partial.

The following are some examples of ouster clauses:

- Singapore. Section 47 of the Industrial Relations Act:
  - (1) Subject to the provisions of this Act, an award shall be final and conclusive.
  - (2) No award or decision or order of a Court or the President or a referee shall be challenged, appealed against, reviewed, quashed, or called in question in any court and shall not be subject to any Quashing Order, Prohibiting Order, Mandatory Order or injunction in any court on any account.
- United Kingdom. Section 4(4) of the Foreign Compensation Act 1950 (14 Geo. 6. c. 12):
  The determination by the Commission of any application made to them under this Act shall not be called into question in any court of law.
- Malaysia. Section 18C of the Societies Act 1966:
  Decision of political party to be final and conclusive 18C. The decision of a political party or any person authorized by it or by its constitution or rules or regulations made thereunder on the interpretation of its constitution, rules or regulations or on any matter relating to the affairs of the party shall be final and conclusive and such decision shall not be challenged, appealed against, reviewed, quashed or called in question in any court on any ground, and no court shall have jurisdiction to entertain or determine any suit, application, question or proceeding on any ground regarding the validity of such decision.

If an ouster clause achieves its desired effect in preventing the courts from exercising judicial review, it will serve as a clear signal to the decision-maker that it may operate without fear of intervention by the courts at a later stage. However, ouster clauses have traditionally been viewed with suspicion by the courts. According to the 19th-century laissez-faire theory championed by A. V. Dicey, which Carol Harlow and Richard Rawlings termed as the "red-light approach" in their 1984 book Law and Administration, there should be a deep-rooted suspicion of governmental power and a desire to minimize the encroachment of the state on the rights of the individuals. Therefore, the executive, which is envisaged as capable of arbitrary encroachment on the rights of individual citizens, is subjected to political control by Parliament and to legal control by the courts.

On the other end of the spectrum, there is the green-light approach derived from the utilitarian school of thought associated with legal philosophers such as Jeremy Bentham and John Stuart Mill. The green-light approach regards state involvement as an effective means to facilitate the delivery of communitarian goals. Hence, ouster clauses are regarded as useful devices to keep a conservatively inclined judiciary at bay. One such communitarian goal achieved by ouster clauses is that it results in consistency and finality in the implementation of policy considerations by encouraging specialist bodies to act as adjudicators in certain areas of administration.

== Total ouster clauses ==
=== In the United Kingdom ===
Total ouster clauses, also known as finality clauses, seek to completely exclude the supervisory jurisdiction of the courts. In the United Kingdom, before the seminal decision of Anisminic Ltd v Foreign Compensation Commission (1968), the law drew a distinction between situations where the public body was acting within the powers conferred on it by law but committed an error of law (a "non-jurisdictional error of law"), and situations where the commission of the error of law meant that the public body did not in fact have power to act (a "jurisdictional error of law"). In the former situation, a total ouster clause precluded the courts from exercising their supervisory function and issuing any prerogative orders to quash the erroneous action. The courts could only step in if the error of law affected the jurisdiction of the public body to act, for example, if the public body erroneously interpreted the scope of the powers conferred upon it, and thus made a decision which it had no power to make.

In R v Medical Appeal Tribunal, ex parte Gilmore (1957), the legality of the total ouster clause in section 36(3) of the National Insurance (Industrial Injuries) Act 1946 was doubted by the Court of Appeal of England and Wales, which issued a certiorari (which would today be called a quashing order) against the Medical Appeal Tribunal for an error of law on the face of the record. Lord Justice of Appeal Alfred Denning stated that the words "any decision of a claim or question ... shall be final" only excluded an appeal but not judicial review:

I find it very well settled that the remedy by certiorari is never to be taken away by any statute except by the most clear and explicit words. The word "final" is not enough. That only means "without appeal". It does not mean "without recourse to certiorari". It makes the decision final on the facts, but not final on the law. Notwithstanding that the decision is by a statute made "final", certiorari can still issue for excess of jurisdiction or for error of law on the face of the record.

In Anisminic, the House of Lords effectively held that any error of law made by a public body will render its decision a nullity, and an ouster clause does not oust the courts' jurisdiction in judicial review unless it clearly states so. The Foreign Compensation Commission had misinterpreted certain subsidiary legislation, with the effect that almost all claims for foreign compensation would be defeated. Their Lordships held that this misconstruction of the legislation rendered the decision ultra vires, and since Parliament could not have intended for the ouster clause to protect an ultra vires determination, judicial review was not precluded. Though Anisminic did not expressly abolish the distinction between jurisdictional and non-jurisdictional errors of law, in R v Lord President of the Privy Council, ex parte Page (1992) the House of Lords noted that:

[T]he decision in [Anisminic] rendered obsolete the distinction between errors of law on the face of the record and other errors of law by extending the doctrine of ultra vires. Thenceforward it was to be taken that Parliament had only conferred the decision-making power on the basis that it was to be exercised on the correct legal basis: a misdirection in law in making the decision therefore rendered the decision ultra vires.

Thus, in English law all errors of law are now to be considered as jurisdictional and ultra vires in a broad sense of the term. This implies that ouster clauses should not be effective against any error of law. The Anisminic principle was upheld by the Supreme Court in both R (on the application of Cart) v Upper Tribunal (2011) and R (on the application of Privacy International) v Investigatory Powers Tribunal and others [2019] so that the rule of law is promoted, among other reasons. Since it is practically immaterial to the victim of an error of law whether it is a jurisdictional error or otherwise, it would be manifestly unjust if judicial review was precluded when a non-jurisdictional error was egregious and obvious, but allowed for a small jurisdictional error.

==== Exceptions ====
Though the scope of judicial review has been expanded considerably following Anisminic, there are still a number of exceptions where total ouster clauses preclude courts from exercising their supervisory function in a judicial review.

===== Courts of law =====
The Anisminic principle applies only to public bodies exercising executive functions, over which the courts can exercise their supervisory role and have the power to decide questions of law. However, superior courts do not have any supervisory function in relation to inferior courts of law, because Parliament is deemed to have intended that such courts are to be final arbiters of questions of law. Whether the decision of a court of law is final and not subject to judicial review depends on a construction of the statute defining the jurisdiction and powers of the court. In Re Racal Communications Ltd (1980), Lord Diplock noted that if a statute provides that the court's decision should be final and conclusive, the "subtle distinctions formerly drawn between errors of law which go to jurisdiction and errors of law which do not" survive. Hence, any non-jurisdictional errors of law made by a court can be only corrected by appeal if the statute provides for it.

===== Internal regulations =====
It was held in Page that if a decision-maker is applying some "domestic law" or internal regulations instead of a general law of the land, then an ouster clause is effective in excluding judicial review unless the decision-maker acts outside his or her jurisdiction (that is, he or she has no power to enter into the adjudication of the dispute), abuses power, or acts in breach of natural justice. In the case, the House of Lords held that a university visitor (overseer) appointed by the founder of a charitable institution to regulate its internal affairs has exclusive jurisdiction to decide disputes arising under the domestic law of the university that has been laid down by the founder in the constitutive documents establishing the university.

===== Comprehensive tribunal system to correct errors of law =====
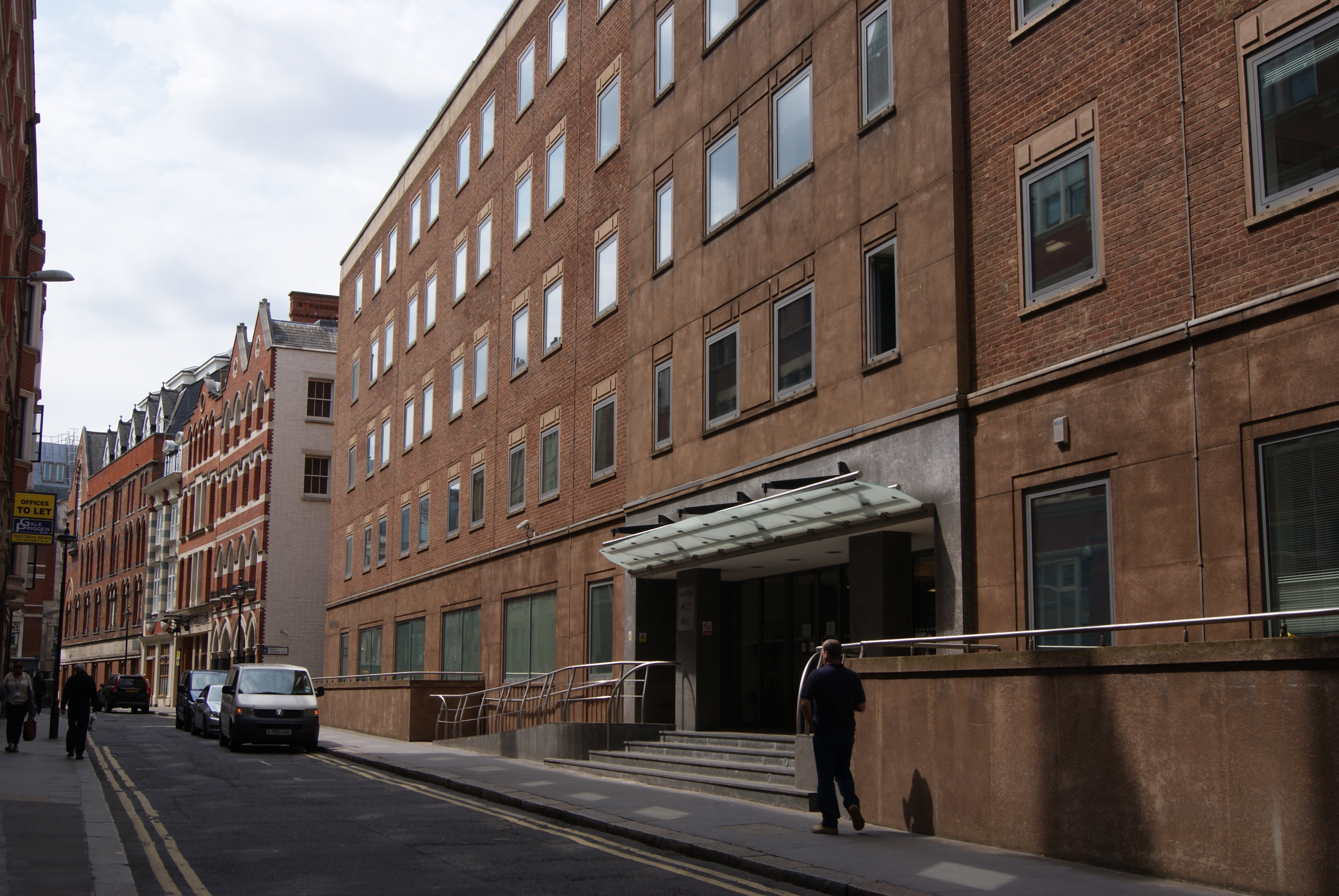
Field House at 15 Bream's Buildings, London, where the Upper Tribunal is based. In a 2011 judgment, the UK Supreme Court held that not all decisions of the Upper Tribunal are subject to judicial review.

Another exception can be found in the Cart judgment. Lord Dyson emphasized that "the scope of judicial review should be no more (as well as no less) than is proportionate and necessary for the maintaining of the rule of law". On the facts of the case, he found it was neither proportionate nor necessary for the maintenance of the rule of law to require unrestricted judicial review. By enacting the Tribunals, Courts and Enforcement Act 2007, Parliament had rationalized the system of administrative tribunals and had created the Upper Tribunal to hear appeals from lower tribunals, thus avoiding the ordinary courts from being overwhelmed by judicial review applications. As the system of tribunals provided ample opportunity for the correction of errors of law, this substantive policy reason precluded the need for all decisions of the Upper Tribunal to be subject to judicial review. Thus, judicial review would only be permitted from an Upper Tribunal decision if it would "raise some important point of principle or practice" or there was "some other compelling reason".

=== In other jurisdictions ===
As the United Kingdom does not have a written constitution and observes the doctrine of parliamentary supremacy, the courts there could not render an ouster clause ineffective due to inconsistency with a constitutional provision, but instead excluded its application in some cases under the common law doctrine of the rule of law. However, in jurisdictions with a written constitution and hence constitutional supremacy, the courts can exclude the application of ouster clauses by pronouncing that the provision is unconstitutional and thus null and void.

==== Australia ====
The High Court of Australia has shown resistance to privative clauses, holding that the ability of legislatures to insulate administrative tribunals from judicial review by means of such clauses is restricted by the Constitution of Australia, particularly section 75(v) which states:

In all matters ... in which a writ of Mandamus or prohibition or an injunction is sought against an officer of the Commonwealth ... the High Court shall have original jurisdiction.

There is a further presumption in construing privative clauses that Parliament did not intend to limit access to the courts. In the High Court decision R v Hickman, ex parte Fox (1945), Justice Owen Dixon said:

They [privative clauses] are not interpreted as meaning to set at large the courts or other judicial bodies to whose decision they relate. Such a clause is interpreted as meaning that no decision which is in fact given by the body concerned shall be invalidated on the ground that it has not conformed to the requirements governing its proceedings or the exercise of its authority or has not confined its acts within the limits laid down by the instrument giving it authority, provided always that its decision is a bona fide attempt to exercise its power, that it relates to the subject matter of the legislation, and that it is reasonably capable of reference to the power given to the body.

Thus, a privative clause does not prevent the High Court from exercising judicial review if an authority has failed to exercise power in a bona fide manner, or if the action taken or decision made is irrelevant to the subject manner of the legislation or does not come within the power conferred on the authority. While a statutory clause will be inconsistent with section 75(v) if it purports to prevent the court from determining whether a Commonwealth officer has engaged "in unlawful or unauthorized conduct" or acted "on the basis that an invalid decision is valid and enforceable", a clause will not be unconstitutional if it has the effect of altering the procedural or substantive law that the court must apply to ensure that "the impugned decision or conduct is in fact valid or lawful".

==== India ====
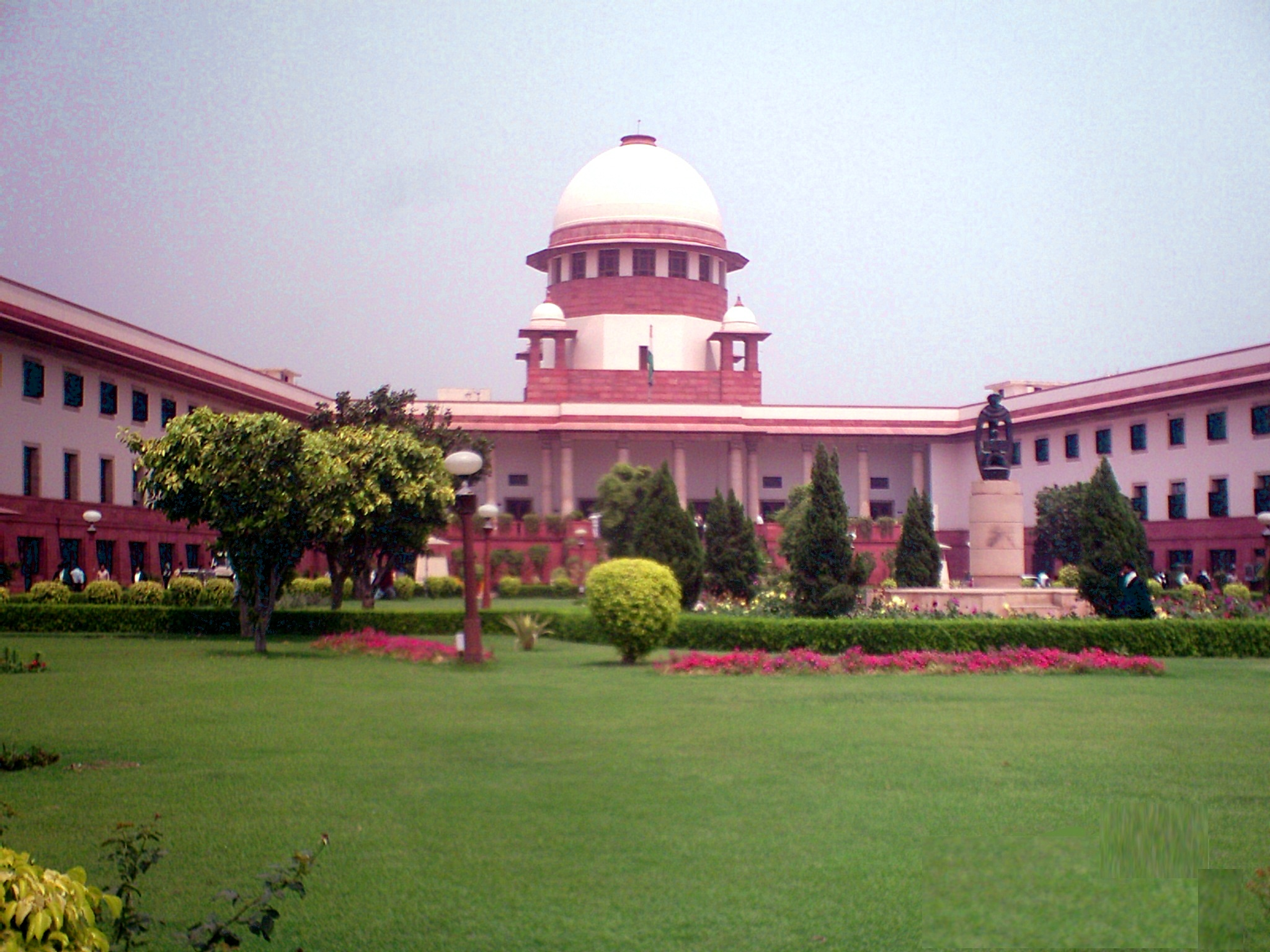
The Supreme Court of India held in a 1980 case that judicial review is part of the basic structure of the constitution

India embraces the basic structure doctrine, which states that the basic structure or features of the constitution may not be amended. Judicial review has been regarded as a basic feature since the case of Minerva Mills v. Union of India (1980), the Supreme Court expressing the following view:

The power of the judicial review is an integral part of our constitutional system and without it, there will be no Government of Laws and the rule of law would become a teasing illusion and a promise of unreality. If there is one feature of our Constitution which, more than any other, is basic and fundamental to the maintenance of democracy and the rule of law, it is the power of judicial review and it is unquestionably a part of the basic structure of the Constitution.

The parliament's "power to destroy is not a power to amend", and hence the power of judicial review may not be abrogated either by the ordinary process of legislation or through the procedure of constitutional amendment. Therefore, it might be argued that ouster clauses, which are intended to make decisions by public authorities and other decision-makers final and unchallengeable before the courts, should be held void and ineffective as they deprive the aggrieved party of an avenue of seeking judicial review. However, it was held in A. B. C. Laminart Pvt. Ltd. v A. P. Agencies, Salem (1989) that where there are two or more courts with jurisdiction over a matter, and an ouster clause merely limits the jurisdiction to one particular court, the ouster clause is valid as the aggrieved party is still left with an avenue to proceed with his or her claim:

[W]here such an ouster clause occurs, it is pertinent to see whether there is ouster of jurisdiction of other Courts. When the clause is clear, unambiguous and specific accepted notions of contract would bind the parties and unless the absence of ad idem can be shown, the other Courts should avoid exercising jurisdiction. As regards construction of the ouster clause when words like 'alone', 'only', 'exclusive' and the like have been used there may be no difficulty. ... In such a case mention of one thing may imply exclusion of another.

==== Singapore ====
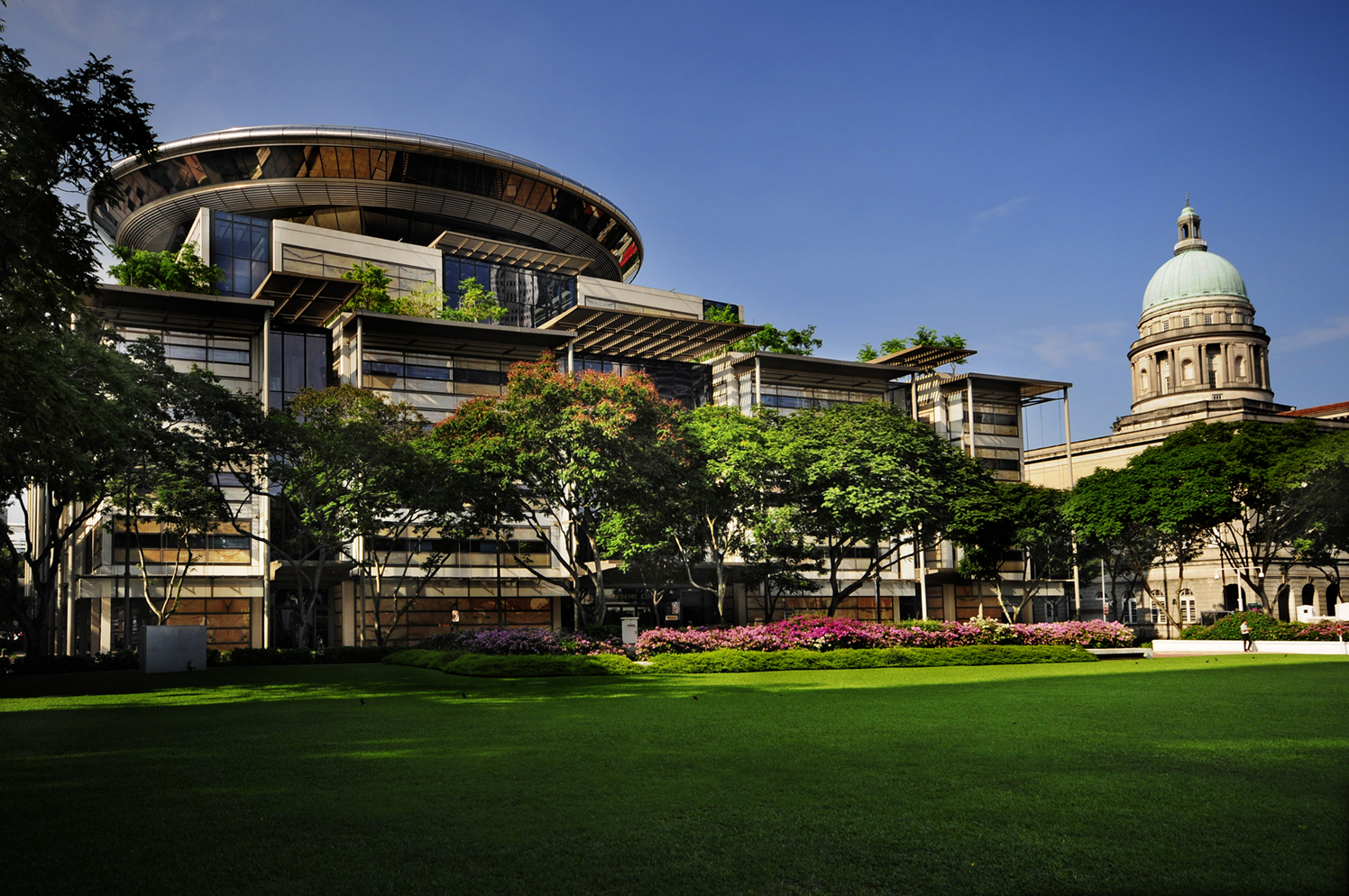
The new and old Supreme Court buildings in Singapore. The effectiveness of ouster clauses in this jurisdiction is still unclear.

In Singapore, the state of the law regarding the effectiveness of ouster clauses is still unclear. Whereas in the United Kingdom the courts have abolished the distinction between non-jurisdictional and jurisdictional errors of law and affirmed that in general ouster clauses are ineffective against errors of law, Singapore cases seem to adopt the traditional pre-Anisminic approach. The distinction between jurisdictional and non-jurisdictional errors of law and the effectiveness of ouster clauses against non-jurisdictional errors of law is exemplified by the cases of Re Application by Yee Yut Ee (1978), and Stansfield Business International Pte. Ltd. v. Minister for Manpower (1999).

In Yee Yut Ee, the High Court neither expressly rejected nor affirmed the abolition of the distinction between jurisdictional and non-jurisdictional errors of law in Anisminic and its effect on the effectiveness of ouster clauses. Instead, the court cited UK authorities holding that ouster clauses are ineffective when there has been an absence of jurisdiction or an excess of jurisdiction on the part of the decision-maker, which was the legal position prior to Anisminic. Although the court did refer to Anisminic, it did so only to observe that the House of Lords had held the ouster clause involved in that case to be irrelevant because a purported determination by the Foreign Compensation Commission which was legally incorrect could not be considered a real determination and had no effect at all. Ultimately, the court quashed the order made by the Industrial Arbitration Court because it contained an error of law which had caused that court to exceed its jurisdiction.

In Stansfield, an employee of the plaintiff alleged that he had been dismissed from his employment without just cause, and made representations to the Minister of Manpower to be reinstated. The Minister agreed with the employee and recommended that the plaintiff provide him with monetary compensation. Even though section 14(5) of the Employment Act states that any decision of the Minister is "final and conclusive, and shall not be challenged in any court of law", the plaintiff challenged the decision by applying to the High Court for judicial review by way of certiorari. In the course of its judgment, the court cited the following passage from South East Asia Fire Bricks Sdn. Bhd. v Non-Metallic Mineral Products Manufacturing Employees Union (1980):

[W]hen words in a statute oust the power of the High Court to review decisions of an inferior tribunal by certiorari, they must be construed strictly ... they will not have the effect of ousting that power if the inferior tribunal has acted without jurisdiction or "if it has done or failed to do something in the course of the inquiry which is of such a nature that its decision is a nullity": per Lord Reid at p. 171 [of Anisminic]. But if the inferior tribunal has merely made an error of law which does not affect its jurisdiction, and if its decision is not a nullity for some reason such as breach of the rules of natural justice, then the ouster will be effective.

It is presently not known whether Singapore courts will eventually adopt the current legal position in the United Kingdom. Chief Justice Chan Sek Keong observed during a 2010 lecture that what the High Court said about Anisminic in Stansfield was obiter dicta because the actual decision was "based on a breach of natural justice and not the doctrine of error of law". The court had concluded that the ouster clause was ineffective in preventing judicial review of the minister's decision, as the plaintiff had not been given a fair opportunity to present its case with knowledge of the opponent's allegations. Chief Justice Chan also advanced an academic argument that ouster clauses might be viewed as being contrary to Article 93 of the Constitution of Singapore, which vests the judicial power of Singapore in the courts, because ouster clauses strip the Supreme Court of its supervisory jurisdiction over inferior tribunals and other public authorities. If the argument that the supervisory jurisdiction of the courts cannot be ousted holds, there is no need to distinguish between jurisdictional and non-jurisdictional errors of law. However, he made it clear that he was not expressing an opinion on the issue.

Following the Indian example, it might be argued that judicial review is a basic feature of the Constitution and cannot be removed through the use of ouster clauses. However, the basic features doctrine was rejected by the High Court in Teo Soh Lung v Minister for Home Affairs (1989). On appeal, the Court of Appeal found it unnecessary to rule on whether the position taken by the High Court is correct or not.

== Partial ouster clauses ==
Unlike a total ouster clause which seeks to preclude judicial review entirely, a partial ouster clause specifies a restricted period of time after which no remedy will be available. However, if the issue of whether a public authority has acted in bad faith arises, the authority's act or decision is not immune to judicial review notwithstanding the lapse of time.

=== In the United Kingdom ===
In Smith v East Elloe Rural District Council (1956), the House of Lords concluded by a majority that it could not impugn a partial ouster clause because, according to Viscount Simonds, "plain words must be given their plain meaning", regardless of an allegation of fraud on the part of the public authority. The consequences of such a narrow approach were recognized in the dissenting judgment by Lord Reid, in which he doubted whether an ouster clause could protect an order that had been obtained by corrupt or fraudulent means from being questioned in court. He wrote:

In every class of case that I can think of the courts have always held that general words are not to be read as enabling a deliberate wrongdoer to take advantage of his own dishonesty.

The decision in Anisminic, which held that total ouster clauses do not safeguard decisions affected by errors of law from judicial review, poses a challenge to the judgment in Smith, but the latter was affirmed by the Court of Appeal of England and Wales in R v Secretary of State for the Environment, ex parte Ostler (1976). The Court held that a distinction could be drawn between a total ouster clause and a partial ouster such as the one in question, which gave the applicants six weeks to challenge the decision. Lord Denning, the Master of the Rolls, explained that the rationale for upholding time limit clauses is that it is in the public interest to promote certainty of the executive's actions. If the courts were to allow plaintiffs to come to them for remedies long after the time limit for doing so has expired, the acts or decisions of authorities would be held up or delayed. As Lord Justice of Appeal Michael Mann explained in R v Cornwall County Council, ex parte Huntington (1992):

The intention of Parliament when it uses an Anisminic clause is that questions as to validity are not excluded. When paragraphs such as those considered in ex p. Ostler are used, then the legislative intention is that questions as to invalidity may be raised on the specified grounds in the prescribed time and in the prescribed manner, but that otherwise the jurisdiction of the court is excluded in the interests of certainty.

== See also ==
- Basic structure doctrine
- Exclusion of judicial review in Singapore law
- Judicial review in English law
- Jurisdiction stripping
