= Ritchie Court =

Period of the Supreme Court of Canada from 1879 to 1892

Supreme Court of Canada
Ritchie Court
- Richards Court ← → Strong Court
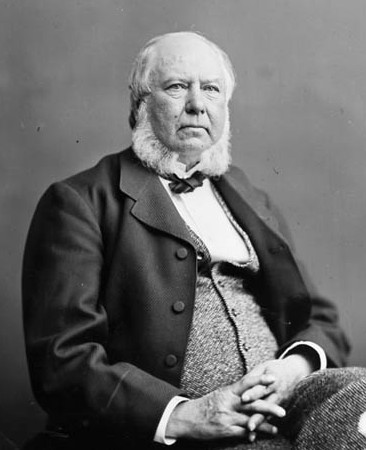
- William Johnstone Ritchie in 1880.
- January 11, 1879 – September 25, 1892 (13 years, 258 days)
- Seat: Second Supreme Court of Canada building
- No. of positions: 6

The Ritchie Court was the period in the history of the Supreme Court of Canada from 1879 to 1892, during which William Johnstone Ritchie served as Chief Justice of Canada. Ritchie succeeded William Buell Richards as Chief Justice after the latter's resignation, and held the position until his death on September 25, 1892.

The Ritchie Court, much like all iterations of the Supreme Court prior to 1949, was largely overshadowed by the Judicial Committee of the Privy Council served as the highest court of appeal in Canada, and its decisions on Canadian appeals were binding on all Canadian courts.

The Ritchie Court continued to face many of the same criticisms as its predecessor, the Richards Court, including the concerns about the conduct of its justices, the excessive length and lack of clarity in its decisions, and significant delays in the publication of those decisions.

== Membership ==
The Supreme Court Act, 1875 established the Supreme Court, composed of six justices, two of whom were allocated to Quebec under law, in recognition of the province's unique civil law system. (Note: The Supreme and Exchequer Court Act, S.C. 1875, c. 11 (The Supreme and Exchequer Court Act at Canadiana)) The Supreme Court had an unwritten regional element with its early appointments, with two justices from Ontario and two from the Maritimes. There was no representation from the western territories or British Columbia.

In January 1879, Chief Justice William Buell Richards resigned following pressure from his longtime friend, Prime Minister John A. Macdonald, likely due to Richards' deteriorating health. On January 11, 1879, William Johnstone Ritchie was appointed Chief Justice by Macdonald.

Members of the previous Richards Court that continued into the Ritchie Court include Télésphore Fournier and Henri-Elzéar Taschereau from Quebec; Samuel Henry Strong from Ontario; and William Alexander Henry of Nova Scotia.

The composition of the Ritchie Court remained relatively stable, with only two new appointments. Both appointments were by Macdonald and both drawn from the Ontario Court of Error & Appeal. The first was John Wellington Gwynne, appointed on January 14, 1879, to fill the vacancy left by Chief Justice Richards. Gwynne was ideologically aligned with Macdonald, sharing his vision of Confederation and support for a strong federal government. Gwynne's appointment was well received and had a reputation for being conscientious and intelligent with a strong understanding of the law of equity. The second was Christopher Salmon Patterson, appointed on October 27, 1888, following the death of William Alexander Henry in May of that year. Patterson's appointment broke with the tradition of regional representation, which would have expected that Henry of Nova Scotia would have a successor appointed from the Maritimes. However, Macdonald and Justice Minister John Sparrow David Thompson concluded that there were no suitable candidates from that region. Patterson was selected for his legal ability and his ideological alignment with a strong federal government in constitutional matters.

=== Timeline ===
Bar key:
Mackenzie appointee Macdonald appointee

== Other branches of government ==
The Ritchie Court began during the 4th Canadian Parliament, under a majority government led by Conservative Prime Minister John A. Macdonald. It overlapped with three general elections, in 1882, 1887, and 1891 which all of which resulted in majority victories for Macdonald's Conservatives. Macdonald died on June 6, 1891, after suffering a stroke, and was succeeded by John Abbott on June 16, 1891. Abbott remained Prime Minister for the remainder of the Ritchie Court's tenure.

== Relationship with the Judicial Committee of the Privy Council ==
From 1867 to 1949, the Judicial Committee of the Privy Council served as the highest court of appeal in Canada, and its decisions on Canadian appeals were binding on all Canadian courts. After the creation of the Supreme Court of Canada it remained possible for appeals on the consent of both parties, to proceed directly from a provincial court of appeal to the Judicial Committee, bypassing the Supreme Court entirely. During the 1880s, 53 appeals were made to the Privy Council, which heard 26 of them. By 1900, the Privy Council had become dominant in Canadian jurisprudence, often deciding Canadian cases with "little or no restraint or respect" for the decisions of the Canadian courts from which the appeals originated.

Between 1879 and 1888, the Privy Council agreed with 53 per cent of the majority decisions rendered by the Supreme Court. When examining individual reasons, the rate of agreement varied significantly among the justices. The Privy Council agreed with the opinions of Justice Henry at a rate of 86 per cent, Justice Fournier at 69 per cent, Justice Ritchie at 56 per cent, Justice Strong at 46 per cent, Justice Taschereau at 23 per cent, and Justice Gwynne at 14 per cent.

During the Ritchie Court era, the Privy Council was largely sympathetic to provincial rights in cases concerning the division of powers under sections 91 and 92 of the Constitution Act, 1867. In Citizens Insurance Co of Canada v Parsons the Privy Council upheld the Supreme Court's ruling that rejected a broad interpretation of the federal trade and commerce power, while endorsing a substantial interpretation of the provincial power over property and civil rights power. (Note: Citizens' and The Queen Insurance Cos v Parsons, 1880 CanLII 6, 4 SCR 215, Supreme Court (Canada)) (Note: The Citizens Insurance Company of Canada and The Queen Insurance Company v Parsons [1881] UKPC 49, (1881-82) LR 7 App Cas 96 (on appeal from Canada)) This provincial-rights approach was further expanded in subsequent appeals from the Supreme Court, including Mercer, (Note: Attorney General of Ontario v Mercer [1883] UKPC 42, (1882-83) LR 8 App Cas 767 (on appeal from Canada)) and The Precious Metals Case, (Note: The Attorney General of British Columbia v The Attorney General of Canada [1889] UKPC 13, (1889) LR 14 App Cas 295 (on appeal from Canada)) as well as in appeals that bypassed the Supreme Court in Russell v The Queen, (Note: Russell v The Queen [1882] UKPC 33, (1881-82) LR 7 App Cas 829 (on appeal from Canada)) and Hodge v The Queen. (Note: Hodge v The Queen [1883] UKPC 59, (1883-84) LR 9 App Cas 117 (on appeal from Canada))

The Privy Council maintained a policy of refusing appeals in criminal cases, a stance that drew public attention in 1885 when it declined Louis Riel's application for special leave to appeal. Shortly after in 1888, Parliament formally abolished criminal appeals to the Privy Council. (Note: An Act further to amend the law respecting Procedure in Criminal Cases, S.C. 1888, c. 43) In 1926, the Privy Council in Nadan v R held the legislation as ultra vires of Parliament, overturning the abolishment of criminal appeals.

== Rulings of the Court ==
The Ritchie Court rendered decisions on 1,007 cases, averaging nearly 72 appeals per year. Of these, 33.8 per cent were upheld, 52.1 per cent dismissed, 0.2 per cent varied, 0.8 per cent were references, and 13.1 per cent quashed, settled or disposed of.

- Valin v Langlois (1879): on jurisdiction for elections. Jean Langlois, the runner up in the 1878 election in Montmorency challenged the election of Pierre-Vincent Valin under the Controverted Elections Act. The Court held that Parliament has sole jurisdiction to regulate federal elections; provincial superior courts have general jurisdiction over questions of federal and provincial law; and that Parliament could give provincial courts jurisdiction to apply federal laws. (Note: Valin v Langlois, 1879 CanLII 29, (1979) 3 SCR 1, Supreme Court (Canada)) The Judicial Committee of the Privy Council denied leave to appeal. (Note: Valin v Langlois [1879] UKPC 68, (1879-80) 5 App. Cas. 115 (13 December 1879) (on appeal from Canada))
- Lenoir v Ritchie (1879): on provincial constitutional rights. Joseph Norman Ritchie applied to the Supreme Court of Nova Scotia, challenging the precedence of provincially appointed Queen's Counsel over his dominion appointment. The Court, through differing individual reasons, unanimously held that Confederation had ended the lieutenant governor's role as a direct representative of the Crown, vesting Royal Prerogative powers in the governor general. (Note: Lenoir v Ritchie, 1879 CanLII 37, 3 SCR 575, Supreme Court (Canada)) This interpretation proved controversial and was largely overturned by the Privy Council in 1892. (Note: The Liquidators of the Maritime bank of Canada v The Receiver General of New Brunswick [1892] UKPC 34, [1892] AC 437 (on appeal from Canada))
- Citizens Insurance Co of Canada v Parsons (1880): on division of powers concerning trade and commerce and property and civil rights. A 4–2 majority of the Court held that an Ontario fire insurance statute was valid under the province's authority over property and civil rights, as it regulated insurance contracts, and narrowed the federal trade and commerce power. The Privy Council upheld the Supreme Court's decision.
- The Queen v McFarlane (1882): on Crown immunity. McFarlane sought damages for the loss of logs caused by a government-owned boom that overloaded and broke away. A 4–1 majority of the Court overturned Justice Henry's attempt, sitting as a judge of the Exchequer Court, to reform Crown immunity. The Court found that in the absence of a contract, no damages could be claimed from the Crown. (Note: The Queen v McFarlane, 1882 CanLII 32, 7 SCR 216, Supreme Court (Canada))
- St Catharines Milling and Lumber Co v R (1887): on Aboriginal title over land. A federal timber permit on Lake Wabigoon in Treaty 3 territory was challenged by Ontario. A 3–2 majority of the Court upheld Ontario's title to the land. However, the Privy Council overturned this decision. (Note: St Catharines Milling and Lumber Co v R, 1887 CanLII 3, 13 SCR 577, Supreme Court (Canada)) (Note: St. Catherines Milling and Lumber Company v The Queen [1888] UKPC 70, (1889) LR 14 App Cas 46 (on appeal from Canada)) The case is notable as the first consideration of Aboriginal title by the Supreme Court of Canada.

== Administration of the Court ==
The Court operated with a panel of six judges, meaning that if there was an equal division (3—3), the appeal would be dismissed. It was also common for each justice to write their own individual reasons for judgement rather than issuing joint judgments. This practice was especially prevalent in the 1880s and, when combined with the frequent dismissal of appeals due to tied votes, made it difficult to establish clear legal precedents or to discern whether a coordinated judicial approach existed. As a result, the Court primarily resolved disputes by applying existing legal principles, rather than by setting new legal standards. Under the Supreme Court Act, the Court held three sessions per year.

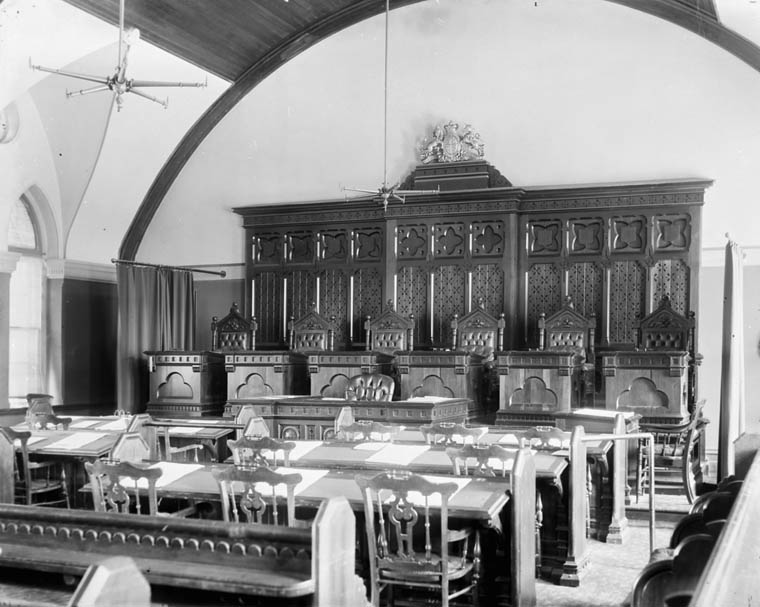
The interior of the Second Supreme Court of Canada building in 1890.

In 1882, the Court moved into permanent accommodations in a refurbished building located at the southwest corner of the West Block on Parliament Hill, facing Bank Street. Originally constructed in 1873 as workshops and stables for the government, the building was designed by Chief Dominion Architect Thomas Seaton Scott. It was renovated in 1881 by Thomas Fuller for use by the Supreme Court. From 1882 until 1887, the Court shared the building with the National Art Gallery. Despite its new home, members of the Court made numerous complaints about the facility, including a persistent "dreadful smell", poor ventilation, cramped space, a lack of offices, and its inconvenient distance from the Library of Parliament.

In 1890, a new wing was constructed to the north of the building which nearly doubled the size of the courthouse facilities by adding a basement, two additional storeys, and an attic. The Supreme Court continued to occupy this building until 1949, when it moved to a purpose-built structure on Wellington Street, west of Parliament.

In its early years, the Court did not sit at a traditional shared bench. Instead, each of the six justices had individual desks. Historians Snell and Vaughan note that this setup coincided with a period in the 1880s marked by deep divisions within the Court and a lack of "consultation and cooperation" among the justices.

The Court recognized the right of applicants from Quebec to use either English or French. While French-language materials were accepted, they were translated into English at the Court's expense. The Supreme Court Act required the Court to publish its own decisions rather than relying on private law reporters, an innovation not found elsewhere in the British Empire. This self-publishing model was intended to ensure that decisions would quickly reach legal professionals and lower court judges. Judgments published in the Supreme Court Reports were printed in the language in which they were delivered and were not translated.

Despite its promise, the Supreme Court Reports faced early criticism for numerous shortcomings, including errors, inconsistent editing and citations, a lack of uniform style, poorly written headnotes, and delays from decision to date of publication. Another issue arose in the 1891 case Stephens v McArthur, (Note: Stephens v McArthur, 1891 CanLII 63, [1891] 19 SCR 446, Supreme Court (Canada)) where the judgement affected the validity of every mortgage and bill of sale in the prairies. The Law Society of Manitoba requested a copy of the decision to print in the Western Law Times, but Justice Strong who wrote the majority opinion refused the request until the decision had been printed in the Supreme Court Reports.

=== Inter-personal issues of the Court ===
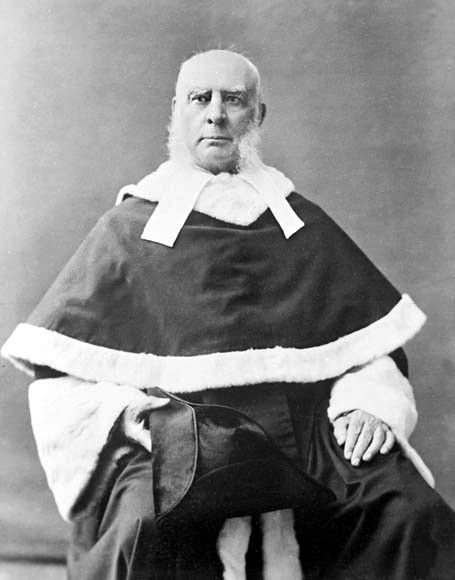
Justice Strong made many complaints about his fellow justices and tendered his resignation on several occasions, but failed to resign when it was finally accepted.

The Court under Chief Justice Ritchie was internally fractured, with its central weakness being the justices' inability to work together effectively and harmoniously. The justices developed what has been described as "immediate antagonism" resulting in a lack of "consultation and cooperation".

For example, Justice Strong wrote to Prime Minister Macdonald to complain about Justice William Alexander Henry, even demanding his removal from the Court. Strong described Henry's judgments as "long, windy, incoherent, masses of verbiage" that misapplied the law, and characterized his conduct as "proof of the incompetency of the Supreme Court". Strong also made private complaints about other justices, including Chief Justice Ritchie. Disillusioned with the Court, Strong offered his resignation to Macdonald several times between 1884 and 1888. Although Macdonald eventually relented and accepted Strong's resignation in 1888, Strong did not follow through with his resignation.

=== Poor Administration of the Court ===
The Ritchie Court's judgments drew criticism for their excessive length. In some instances, justices delivered decisions that were not formally prepared and consisted merely of verbal directions regarding the outcome of the case, resulting in some cases not being reported.

Historians Snell and Vaughan note that Justice Strong was among the worst offenders. On occasion, the Court Registrar had to visit Strong at home and threaten to withhold publication of his decisions to compel him to complete his work. In one case, the Registrar published a note stating: "The learned judge [Strong], having mislaid his judgment, directed the reporter to report the case without it". (Note: Milloy v Kerr, 1880 CanLII 5, 8 SCR 474, Supreme Court (Canada)) By 1888, the Registrar reported that 21 of the 25 outstanding cases awaiting publication were delayed solely because Strong had not submitted his completed reasons.

The Court also struggled to maintain quorum due to frequent and extended absences by its justices. Justice Taschereau and Justice Gwynne each took leaves in 1884, while Justice Strong was on leave in 1880, 1885, and 1890.

During the 1880s, Supreme Court justices received an annual salary of $7,000 (equivalent to $240,511 in 2025), with the Chief Justice receiving an additional $1,000. The salary was considered low for the time, and rumors circulated that all the justices, except for Chief Justice Ritchie, had drawn several months' salary in advance as loans from banks.

== Appraisal ==
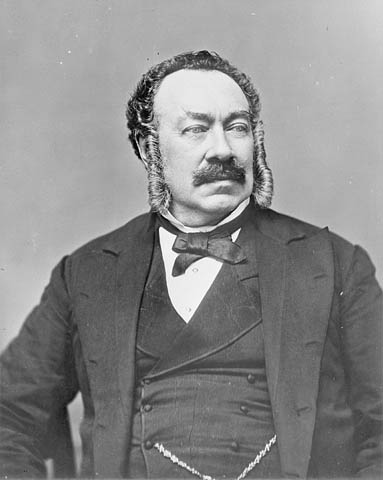
The decisions of Justice William Alexander Henry may have been highly influential to the Privy Council.

Historians Snell and Vaughan note that the Supreme Court was gradually seen as an institution of increasing value to both politicians and the legal profession. Edward Blake's 1890 proposal to expand the Court's reference power as an alternative to the federal disallowance power reflected the Court's growing legitimacy as a forum for resolving legal and constitutional questions. However, the Court's continued inability to secure a suitable building also reflected its perceived inferiority in the eyes of the federal government.

Historian Ian Bushnell characterizes the 1879 term, which marked the beginning of the Ritchie Court, as the onset of a period of "uncreative decision-making" that lasted for several years. He describes the justices as "unable or unwilling" to assert themselves through robust legal reasoning or to respond meaningfully to Canada's evolving social context in constitutional litigation. This perceived lack of judicial leadership weakened the Court's standing in Canadian society. On major constitutional questions such as Russell, and Hodge, litigants frequently bypassed the Supreme Court in favour of direct appeals from provincial courts to the Privy Council.

Contemporary commentary echoed this critical assessment. The Canada Law Journal described the Supreme Court as a "failure" and criticized the justices as being ill-suited or unqualified for their appointments.

The Ritchie Court's role in shaping the division of powers between the federal and provincial governments was overshadowed by the decisions of the Privy Council. Within the Supreme Court, Justices Ritchie and Strong generally adopted a provincial-rights perspective, while Justice Gwynne strongly supported a strong federal government. Bushnell also observes that the Privy Council appears to have been influenced in its constitutional jurisprudence by the reasons of Justice William Alexander Henry, who was a Father of Confederation. Between 1879 and 1888, the Privy Council agreed with the reasons of Justice Henry in 86 per cent of appeals, significantly higher than its 53 per cent rate of agreement with the Supreme Court's overall majority decisions.

== See also ==
- Supreme Court of Canada cases
- List of Supreme Court of Canada cases (Richards Court through Fauteux Court)
- List of Canadian appeals to the Judicial Committee of the Privy Council, 1880–1889
- List of Canadian appeals to the Judicial Committee of the Privy Council, 1890–1899
