= Richards Court =

Period of the Supreme Court of Canada from 1875 to 1879

Supreme Court of Canada
Richards Court
- established ← → Ritchie Court
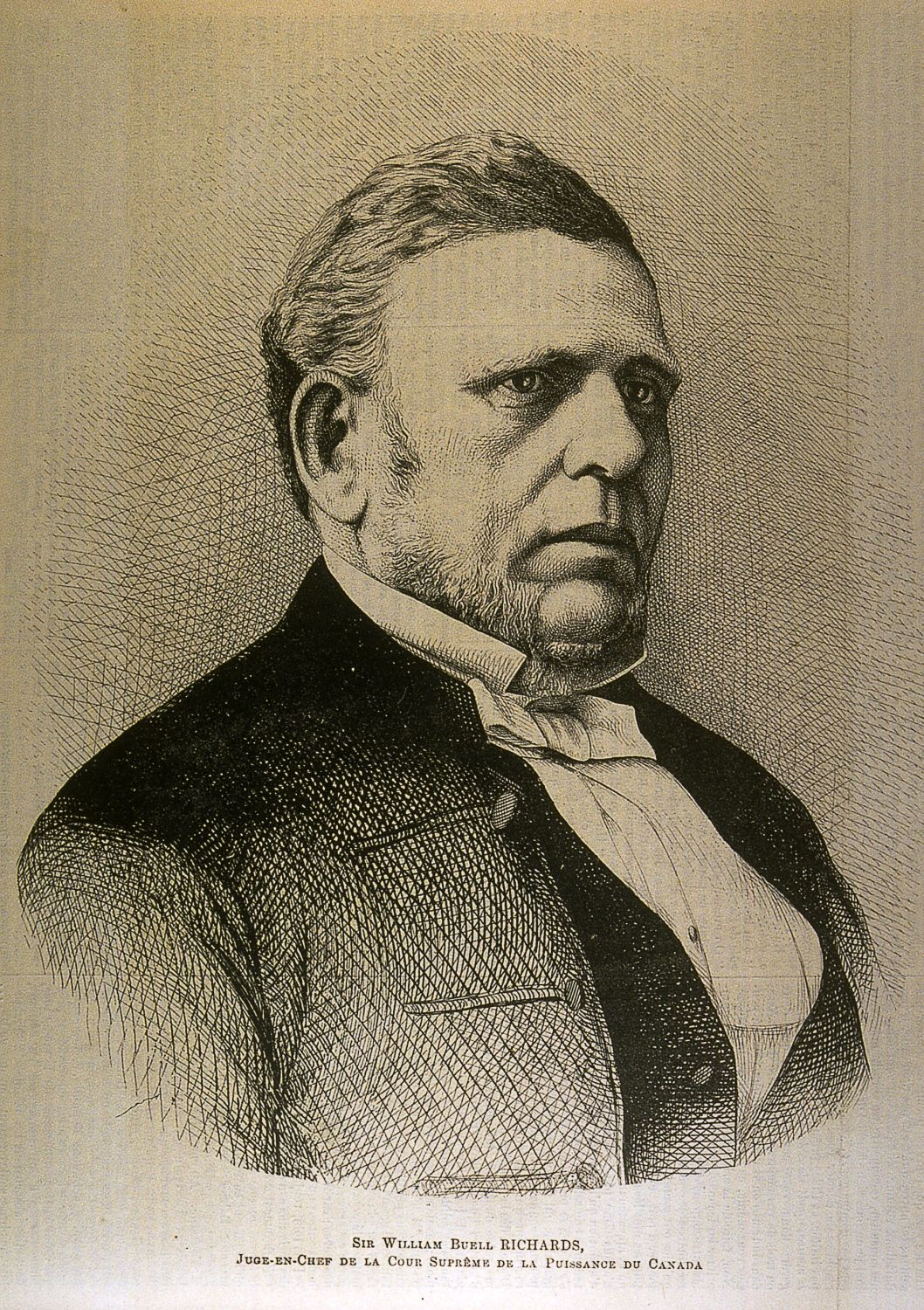
- William Buell Richards in 1877.
- October 8, 1875 – January 11, 1879 (3 years, 95 days)
- Seat: various rooms in the Parliament buildings
- No. of positions: 6

The Richards Court was the period in the history of the Supreme Court of Canada from 1875 to 1879, during which William Buell Richards served as Chief Justice of Canada. Richards was appointed the first Chief Justice by Prime Minister Alexander Mackenzie following the establishment of the Supreme Court in 1875.

Like all iterations of the Supreme Court before 1949, the Richards Court was largely overshadowed by the Judicial Committee of the Privy Council, which served as Canada's highest court of appeal. Its decisions on Canadian appeals were binding on all Canadian courts.

The Richards Court was marked by controversy surrounding the Court's creation, concerns about the conduct of its justices, the length and lack of clarity in its decisions, and significant delays in the publication of those decisions.

== Membership ==
The Supreme Court Act, 1875 established the newly created court with six justices, two of whom were allocated to Quebec under law, in recognition of the province's unique civil law system. (Note: The Supreme and Exchequer Court Act, S.C. 1875, c. 11 (The Supreme and Exchequer Court Act at Canadiana))

On October 8, 1875, General William O'Grady Haly administered the oath of office to Chief Justice William Buell Richards. A month later on November 8, the five puisne justices took their oath of office. Representing Quebec were Télésphore Fournier, the Minister of Justice who had introduced the Supreme and Exchequer Court Act, 1875, and Jean-Thomas Taschereau, a judge of the Quebec Court of Queen's Bench. Two justices were appointed from Ontario, the Chief Justice Richards, and Samuel Henry Strong, who had helped draft the 1869 proposal and served a judge on the Ontario Supreme Court. The remaining two seats went to William Johnston Ritchie, chief justice of New Brunswick, and William Alexander Henry, a former Nova Scotia MLA who lost his seat due to his role as a Father of Confederation.

On October 6, 1878, Jean-Thomas Taschereau resigned. He was replaced by his cousin Henri-Elzéar Taschereau, who was appointed by Alexander Mackenzie after the liberals lost the 1878 election, but two days before John A. Macdonald was sworn in again as Prime Minister.

In January 1879, Chief Justice Richards resigned following pressure from his longtime friend, Prime Minister John A. Macdonald, likely due to his deteriorating health. On January 11, 1879, William Johnstone Ritchie was elevated to Chief Justice, and three days later, John Wellington Gwynne was appointed to fill Richards' seat on the Court.

=== Membership timeline ===
Bar key:
Mackenzie appointee

== Other branches of government ==
The Prime Minister during a majority of the Richards Court was Alexander Mackenzie who led the Liberal majority in Parliament until October 8, 1878. Following Mackenzie, Conservative John A. Macdonald was re-elected to a majority government.

== Relationship with the Judicial Committee of the Privy Council ==
From 1867 to 1949, the Judicial Committee of the Privy Council served as the highest court of appeal in Canada, and its decisions on Canadian appeals were binding on all Canadian courts. After the creation of the Supreme Court of Canada it remained possible for appeals on the consent of both parties, to proceed directly from a provincial court to the Judicial Committee, bypassing the Supreme Court entirely.

The Richards Court heard one appeal that ultimately went to the Privy Council. In Johnston v Andrew's Church (Church Pews Case) (Note: Johnstone v The Minister & Trustees of St. Andrews Church, Montreal, 1877 CanLII 22, 1 SCR 235, Supreme Court (Canada)) the Court dealt with a complaint from a parishioner whose leased seat at the St. Andrews Church was terminated. The Quebec Superior Court dismissed the claim, and the Supreme Court upheld that decision by a 4–2 majority. The Privy Council subsequently affirmed the Supreme Court's ruling. (Note: Minister and Trustees of St. Andrews Church Montreal v James Johnston [1877] UKPC 48, 3 App Cas 159, (1877-78) LR 3 App Cas 159, Privy Council (on appeal from Canada))

== Selected rulings of the Court ==
- Reference An Act to incorporate the Brothers of the Christian Schools in Canada (1876): whether the private bill fell within the federal government's legislative authority. The Court sat a panel of four Justices. Without providing written reasons, Justices Ritchie, Strong, and Fournier held, that the bill fell under exclusive provincial jurisdiction. Chief Justice Richards did not answer whether the Court had jurisdiction to hear a reference question related to a private member's bills.
- Kelly v Sulivan (1877): first case heard by the Supreme Court. The Prince Edward Island Legislature had enacted a law requiring the compulsory purchase of land owned by absentee landlords that was not being used. The Supreme Court allowed the province's scheme to continue to operate, overturning the decision of the Supreme Court of Prince Edward Island. (Note: Kelly v Sulivan, 1877 CanLII 31, (1877) 1 SCR 3, Supreme Court (Canada))
- Brassard v Langevin (1877): the annulment of Conservative Hector-Louis Langevin's election due to the influence of Catholic priests, who had declared that voting for the Liberal party was a sin. The arguments centered on freedom of religion and the separation of church and state. The Court held that the election was invalid and that the priests were not immune from civil legal proceedings. (Note: Brassard et al v Langevin, 1877 CanLII 23, (1877) 1 SCR 145, Supreme Court (Canada))
- Severn v The Queen (1878): the Court's first major constitutional case. John Severn, a brewer, was licensed by the federal government to manufacture beer under the Canada Temperance Act, but was not licensed under Ontario law, and subsequently the province took action against him. The Court considered the federal trade and commerce power under section 91(2) of the British North America Act, and the 4–2 majority in individually written decisions invalidated the provincial legislation, primarily in context to provinces interfering with federal revenue sources. (Note: Severn v The Queen, 1878 CanLII 29, (1878) 2 SCR 70, Supreme Court (Canada))
- Landers v Woodworth (1878): on parliamentary privilege for provincial legislatures. The Nova Scotia House of Assembly claimed that it had the privilege to order one of its members Douglas Benjamin Woodworth, to apologize and to forcibly remove him for contempt when he refused. Legislatures of provinces have the powers of privilege afforded by statute, or those necessary or incidental to their functions. (Note: Landers v Woodworth, 1878 CanLII 25, (1878) 2 SCR 158, Supreme Court (Canada))

== Administration of the Court ==
The Court operated with a panel of six judges, meaning that if there was an equal division (3—3), the appeal would be dismissed. It was also common for each justice to draft their own reasons for judgement rather than preparing joint reasons. This practice, combined with the dismissal of cases due to tied votes, made it difficult to establish clear legal precedents or determine whether a coordinated judicial approach to the law existed. As a result, the Court primarily resolved disputes based on existing legal principles rather than setting new legal standards.

The Court did not have its own building and initially sat in the Railway Committee Room in the Parliament buildings. The administration of the Court was conducted in English, and French-speaking judges corresponding with each other in English. The Court recognized the right of applicants from Quebec to use either English or French, but French documents were translated into English at the Court's expense. The Supreme Court Act required the Court to publish its own decisions rather than rely on private publishers, an innovation not present elsewhere in the British Empire. Self-publishing was intended to ensure that decisions could quickly reach legal professionals and lower court judges. Decisions published in the Supreme Court Reports were printed in the judgement's original language and were not translated. Early in its history, the Supreme Court Reports was criticized for errors, editing, citations, lack of uniform style, poorly written headnotes, and delays in reaching publication. Under the Supreme Court Act, the court held two sessions per year, until 1879, when the Act was amended to add a third session.

=== Inter-personal issues of the Court ===
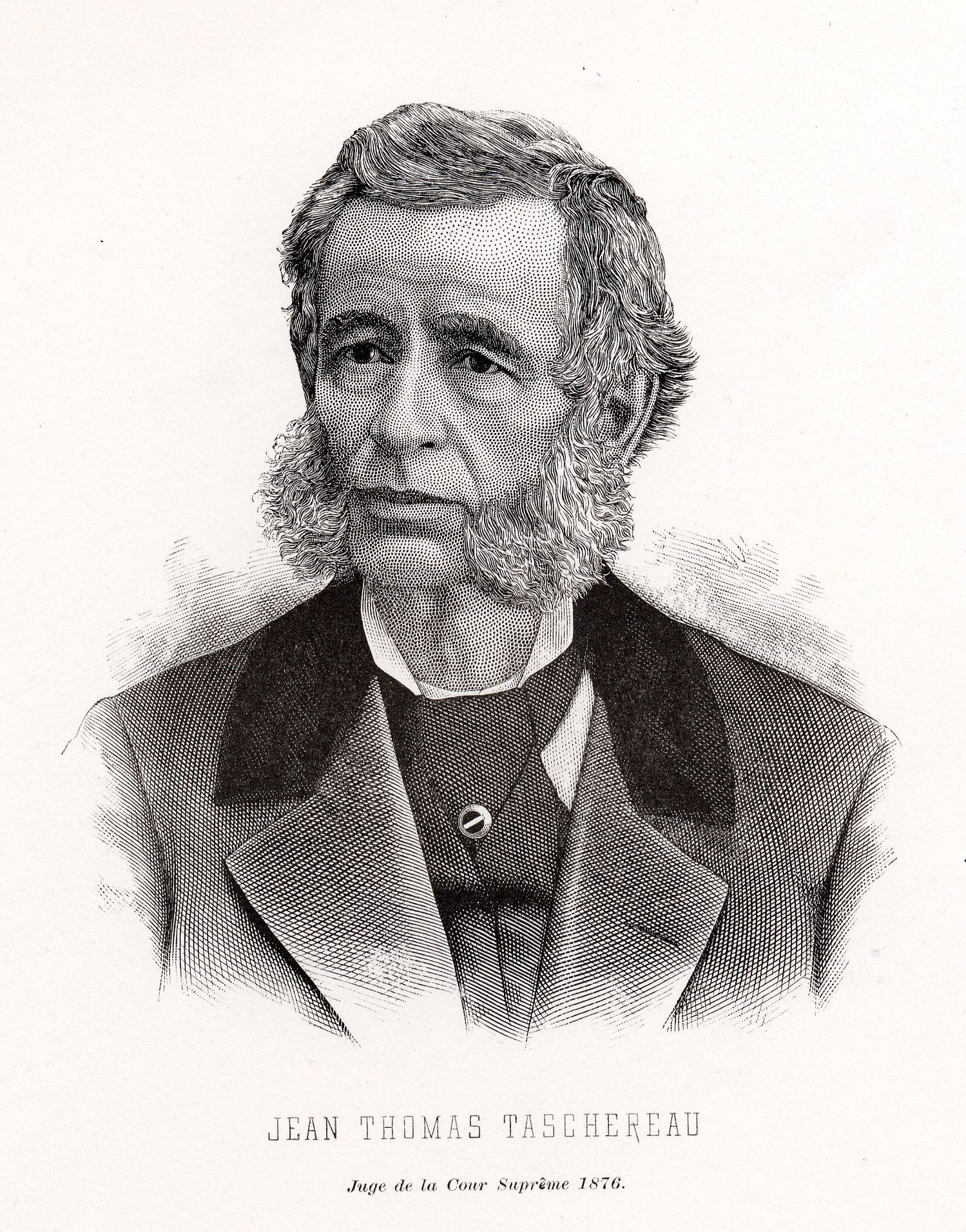
Jean-Thomas Taschereau refused to live in Ottawa after his appointment to the Court.

The conduct of individual justices during this period also drew public criticism. Justice Henry took leave from Ottawa on two occasions, while Justice Strong was absent for six months during a sitting of the Court, prompting disapproval from members of the bar. Justice Taschereau, who had not been expected to accept a position on the Court, quickly sought an exemption from the requirement to reside within 5 miles (8.0 km) of Ottawa. He requested a leave of absence during the Court's first sitting, which, when combined with Justice Henry's absence, would have resulted in the Court lacking quorum for its inaugural session. Although the government refused to grant the exemption, it also did not want Taschereau to resign early in his term. Ultimately, Taschereau maintained his residence in Quebec City despite the statutory requirement to live in Ottawa, leading to ongoing complaints from the legal community until his retirement.

== Appraisal ==
Legal Historians James G. Snell and Frederick Vaughn note that the Court's work during this period was unimpressive, producing judgments that were lengthy, unclear, and difficult to understand. Most applications to the Court involved civil or commercial disputes concerning mundane issues and insignificant questions of law. Public perception of the Court and its justices was persistently negative, as neither the government nor members of the legal profession held it in high regard. This lack of respect stemmed from several factors: the Supreme Court was an intermediary court that could be bypassed in favor of the Judicial Committee of the Privy Council; critics who prioritized provincial rights and strong ties to Great Britain distrusted the Court; and politicians of the time were generally wary of a centralized and complex judicial system. Additionally, the Court's design and role deviated from prevailing ideas within the legal profession, further undermining its credibility and support.

Snell and Vaughn note that Richards' tenure as Chief Justice fell short of expectations and failed to meet the needs of the newly established Court. He struggled to assert control over the Court and to balance the diverse personalities and abilities of the other justices. However, they note some of Richards' shortcomings could be attributed to his poor health.

== See also ==
- Supreme Court of Canada cases
- List of Supreme Court of Canada cases (Richards Court through Fauteux Court)
