= Kelly v Sulivan =

- Supreme Court of Canada

Hearing: 8–9 June 1876 Judgment: 10 June 1876
- Full case name: In the matter of the application of Francis Kelly, Commissioner of Public Lands, for the purchase of the estate of Charlotte Antonia Sulivan, and the Prince Edward Island Land Purchase Act, 1875.
- Prior history: APPEAL FROM a decision of the Supreme Court of Judicature of Prince Edward Island, quashing an award made on 4 September 1875 by the Commissioners of Public Lands
- Ruling: The Supreme Court of Judicature of Prince Edward Island is the court of last resort for that Province. That court did not have the power to quash an award by the Commissioners of Public Lands — under the Land Purchase Act, 1875 it only had the power to remit the award back for reconsideration if application had been made within thirty days of the date of the award.

Court membership
- Era: Richards Court; Chief Justice: William Buell Richards; Puisne Justices: William Johnstone Ritchie, Samuel Henry Strong, Jean-Thomas Taschereau, Télesphore Fournier, William Alexander Henry

Reasons given
- Henry J took no part in the consideration or decision of the case.

Kelly v. Sulivan, 1876 CanLII 9, 1 SCR 3 was the first case heard by the Supreme Court of Canada. The Court answered the simple question of whether a case ruling from the Supreme Court of Judicature of Prince Edward Island could be appealed to a provincial appellate court. On the evidence available the Court found that there was insufficient records to prove that an appellate court for the province was ever created.

== The Court before Kelly ==
The Supreme Court had only just come into existence. On April 8, 1875, the bill creating the court was passed and the court was inaugurated on November 18. The Court's very first sitting was on January 17, but there were no cases to be heard so they adjourned until spring.

That April the Supreme Court was given a reference question from the Senate of Canada (In Re "The Brothers of the Christian Schools in Canada"). The Senate wanted to know if a bill entitled "An Act to incorporate the Brothers of the Christian Schools in Canada" was constitutional and within the authority of the federal government. Only Ritchie, Strong, and Fournier JJ. were in attendance, each only giving a single-sentence judgement.

It was not until June that the Court had its first hearings with the case of Kelly v. Sullivan.

== Background ==
In 1873, Prince Edward Island agreed to join Confederation, and one of the terms of union was that the federal government of Canada agreed to contribute $800,000 towards the purchase of absentee landholdings on the Island. To that end, the Legislative Assembly of Prince Edward Island passed the Land Purchase Act, 1875, which provided a procedure for the compulsory acquisition of all such estates that were larger than 500 acres (200 ha), other than untenanted estates less than 1,000 acres (400 ha). Awards in disputes relating to land values were made by the Commissioners of Public Lands, whose decisions could be appealed to the Supreme Court of Prince Edward Island under s. 45 of the Act within 30 days of the award. The same section provided that the Court could remit the award back to the Commissioners; otherwise, such awards were declared to be "binding, final and conclusive on all parties."

In 1875, the Commissioner of Public Lands applied to acquire the lands of Charlotte Antonia Sulivan, and the resulting award determined that she was entitled to be paid $81,500. Sulivan, through her agent George Wastie DeBlois, appealed on the basis that the awards did not describe the lands in sufficient detail, that proper legal procedures had not been followed, and that the British North America Act did not permit such legislation as the Land Purchase Act. The provincial Supreme Court agreed in January 1876.

The Province, through Francis Kelly, its Commissioner for Public Lands, lodged an appeal to the newly created Supreme Court of Canada, on the basis that:

1. The SCC had jurisdiction to hear the appeal
2. The award was final under s. 45 of the Act
3. There was no uncertainty to the award, and the Court had no jurisdiction to declare it bad

In response, Sulivan's side contended:

1. No appeal lay to the SCC, as PEI legislation recognized the existence of a Court of Error and Appeal composed of the Lieutenant-Governor in Council
2. The provincial Court did possess jurisdiction to act as it did, under s. 32 of the Act
3. The Commissioners had no jurisdiction in this cause, and therefore their award was bad and should be set aside
4. The award is not final and it is uncertain, and it also exceeded its jurisdiction as it dealt with all of Sulivan's lands, and not just those in excess of 500 acres

== Ruling ==
The Court was unanimous in its ruling, although each justice issued a separate opinion. In the most comprehensive ruling, Richards CJ declared:

1. The provincial Court was the court of last resort for the purposes of appeal to the SCC, as no other court of error or appeal was shown to have been in operation before Confederation
2. The Act contemplated the acquisition of total estates, and not just lands in excess of 500 acres
3. The provincial Court's powers were expressly circumscribed by s. 45 of the Act

== See also ==
- List of Supreme Court of Canada cases (Richards Court through Fauteux Court)
