= Citizens Insurance Co of Canada v Parsons =

Canadian constitutional law case – 1881

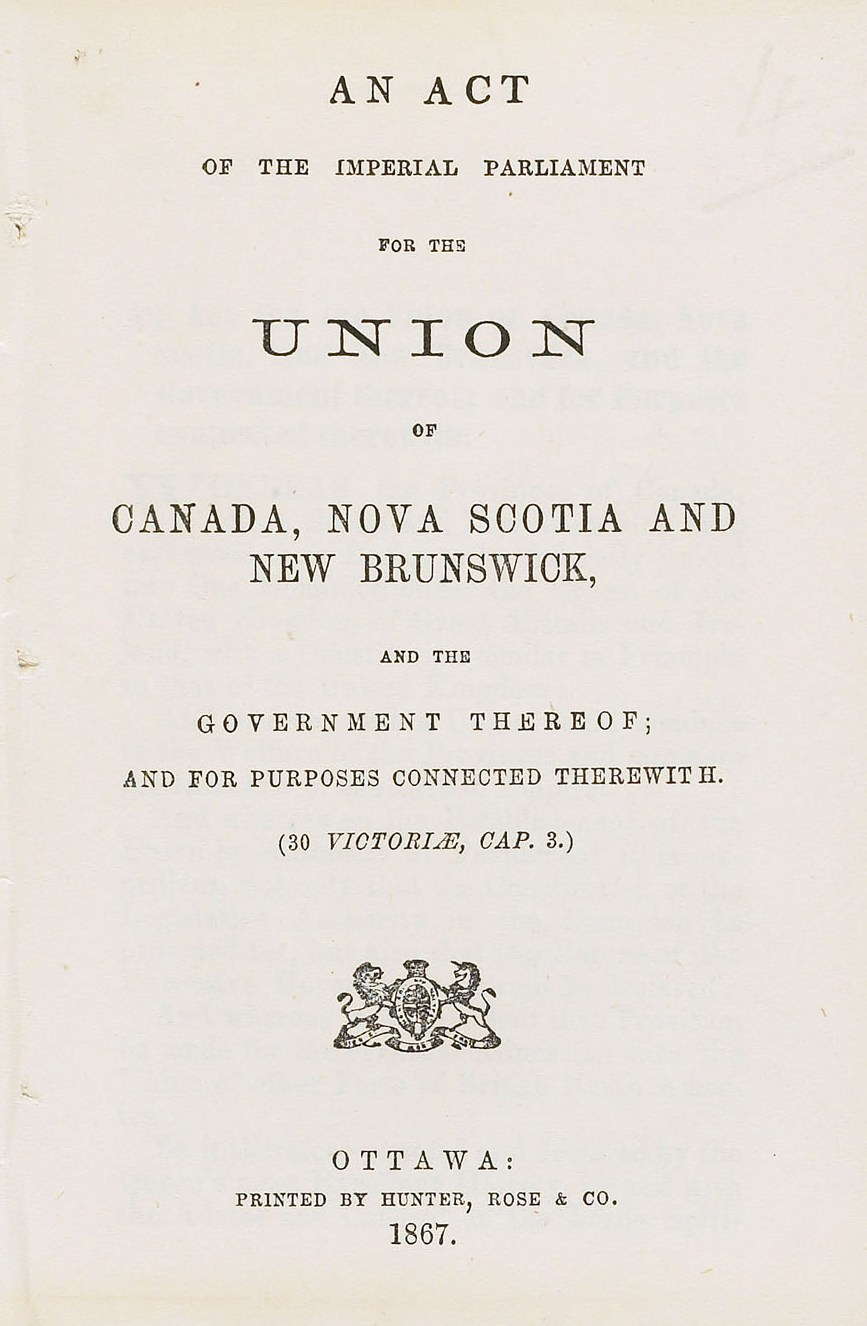
- Citizens Insurance was one of the early major cases interpreting the British North America Act, 1867
- Court: Judicial Committee of the Privy Council
- Full case name: The Citizens Insurance Company of Canada and The Queen Insurance Company v Parsons
- Decided: 26 November 1881
- Citations: [1881] UKPC 49, (1881) 7 App.Cas. 96

Case history
- Prior actions: Citizens' and The Queen Insurance Cos. v. Parsons; Western Ins. Co. v. Johnston (1880), 4 SCR 215, 1880 CanLII 6, affirming a decision of the Ontario Court of Appeal
- Appealed from: Supreme Court of Canada

Court membership
- Judges sitting: Sir Barnes Peacock; Sir Montague Smith; Sir Robert P. Collier; Sir Richard Couch; Sir Arthur Hobhouse

Case opinions
- Decision by: Sir Montague Smith

Keywords
- Constitutional law, division of powers, trade and commerce, property and civil rights, insurance

Citizens Insurance Co of Canada v Parsons is a major Canadian constitutional case decided by the Judicial Committee of the Privy Council, at that time the highest court of appeal for the British Empire. The case decided a significant issue of the division of powers between the federal Parliament and the provincial legislatures. The approach taken to provincial power, as advocated by Premier Oliver Mowat of Ontario, began to set the constitutional framework for broad provincial powers and a reduction in the centralist vision of Confederation espoused by Prime Minister John A. Macdonald.

At issue was the scope of provincial legislative jurisdiction over property and civil rights under s. 92(13) of the British North America Act, 1867 (now the Constitution Act, 1867) compared to the federal power over trade and commerce under s. 91(2). The Judicial Committee held that the provincial power included regulating individual business contracts, in this case insurance contracts, while the federal trade and commerce power related to matters that affected Canada as a whole, but did not extend to regulating particular businesses.

Although the point in issue was a matter of insurance law, the constitutional aspect of the decision was far-reaching. The Judicial Committee decision rejected a broad interpretation of the federal trade and commerce power, and established a substantial reading of the provincial property and civil rights power.

The case continues to be regularly cited by the Supreme Court of Canada in division of powers cases. It is included in a collection of significant constitutional decisions from the Judicial Committee, published by the federal Department of Justice.

== Factual background ==
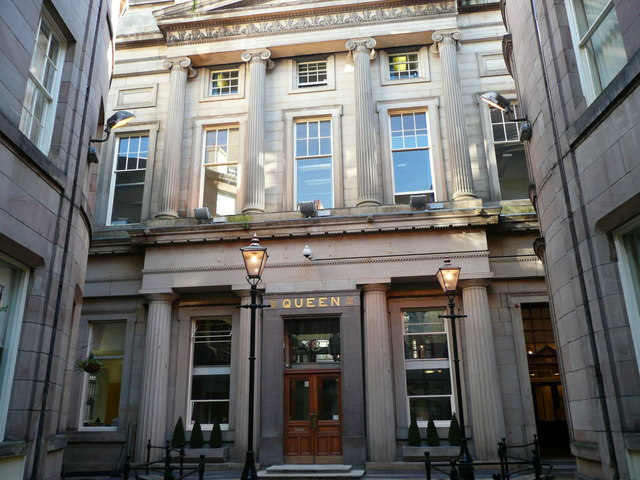
Head office of Queen Insurance Company, Liverpool, England, one of the three insurance companies involved in the court case

There were three separate court cases which were tried separately, but heard together on appeal by the Supreme Court of Canada, as they raised the same constitutional issue.

William Parsons was the owner of a hardware store in Orangeville, Ontario, covered by an insurance policy provided by Citizens' Insurance Company of Canada. (Note: The Supreme Court decision refers to the company name with a possessive: "Citizens' Insurance". The Judicial Committee decision refers to it without the possessive: "Citizens Insurance". As it is not known which was more accurate, the different names are used in the discussion of the Supreme Court and Judicial Committee decisions.) At the time the policy was issued, he had a similar policy in effect with the Western Assurance Company. When the store burnt down in a fire in August 1877, Citizens' Insurance refused to pay on the basis that the nondisclosure of the Western policy violated the terms of its policy, and also breached a statutory condition, under Ontario's Fire Insurance Policy Act. Parsons sued to collect on the policy and contended that it did not comply with the presentation requirements of the provincial Act.

Parsons also had an insurance policy with Queen Insurance Company. When he claimed on that insurance policy for the fire, Queen Insurance refused to pay for a number of reasons, including the same argument that there was an undisclosed contract for insurance with another company.

The third case involved Ellen Johnston, who held a policy of insurance with the Western Assurance Company, which refused to pay on the basis that they had been incorporated by the former Province of Canada and continued under federal legislation, and therefore were not required to comply with the provincial Fire Insurance Act.

In addition, all three companies had been authorised to carry out the business of fire insurance by licences issued under federal law relating to fire insurance companies.

== Ontario court decisions ==
=== Trial decisions ===
The three cases were tried separately in the Ontario Court of Queen's Bench. In all three cases, the Queen's Bench entered a verdict in favour of the insured, against the insurance companies. In each case, the court ruled that the provincial Fire Insurance Act applied and prevented the insurance companies from raising the arguments regarding non-compliance with terms of the insurance policies. The Fire Insurance Act set out mandatory terms that had to be included in all policies, which the insurance companies had not done. Failure to do so meant that they could not rely on the restrictive clauses in the policies.

=== Ontario Court of Appeal ===
The three insurance companies then appealed to the Ontario Court of Appeal. Since all three companies were trying to rely on clauses in their policies that did not comply with the Ontario Fire Insurance Act, they all challenged the constitutionality of that Act. Citizens' Insurance argued that the provincial law did not apply to it, since it was incorporated by a federal statute and governed by federal insurance law. Queen Insurance argued that since it was incorporated under English law, a provincial law could not restrict its contracts. Western Assurance argued that since it had been incorporated by the former Province of Canada, and continued under federal law, it was not subject to the provincial law.

In each case, the Court of Appeal rejected the arguments of the insurance companies and ruled in favour of Parsons and Johnston.

== Supreme Court of Canada ==
=== Counsel and arguments ===
The three insurance companies then appealed to the Supreme Court of Canada. They were represented by Christopher Robinson, QC, James Bethune, and J.T. Small. The respondents, Parsons and Johnston, were represented by Dalton McCarthy, QC. Premier Oliver Mowat, QC, acting in his role as Attorney General of Ontario, intervened to argue for the constitutionality of the provincial Fire Insurance Act.

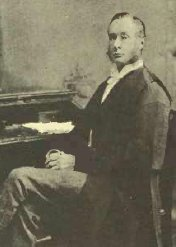
Christopher Robinson, QC, lead counsel for the insurance companies

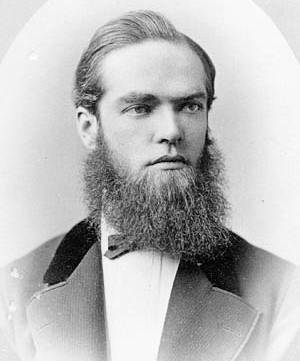
James Bethune, junior counsel for the insurance companies

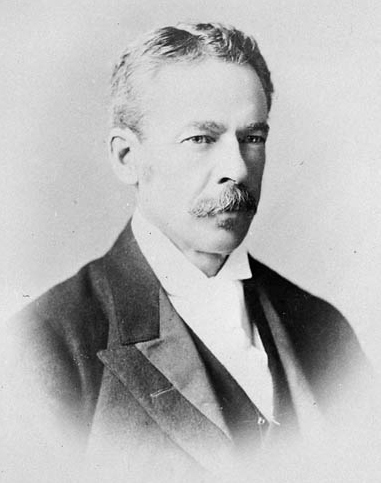
Dalton McCarthy, QC, counsel for Parsons and Johnston

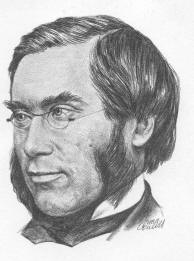
Oliver Mowat, QC, Attorney General for Ontario, who intervened to defend provincial jurisdiction

Counsel for the insurance companies challenged the constitutionality of the provincial statute on two main grounds: (1) the business of insurance was within the exclusive jurisdiction of the federal Parliament, as a matter of "trade and commerce", assigned to Parliament by s. 91(2) of the Constitution Act, 1867, and therefore beyond provincial authority; and (2) the insurance companies were incorporated by the federal government or under British law, and authorised by their corporate charters to carry on the business of fire insurance, so provincial laws could not restrict their contracts of insurance.

Counsel for Parsons and Johnstone, and the Attorney General for Ontario, argued that contracts are a well-established example of "property and civil rights", under Canadian law and also under English law. The federal power to regulate trade and commerce applies to Canada as a whole, but does not take the law of contract out of provincial jurisdiction. The provincial law regulating the terms of fire insurance contracts was a matter of "property and civil rights" under s. 92(13) of the Constitution Act, 1867, and also a purely local matter, under s. 92(16). None of the corporate charters tried to make them immune from provincial law. As well, the provincial law in question was designed not to benefit insurance companies, but to protect the residents of the province to ensure fair term of insurance. Within the matters assigned to them the provinces have sovereign powers to legislate as fully and amply as they deem fit.

=== Decision of the Supreme Court ===
The Supreme Court dismissed the appeals of the three insurance companies, by a majority of 4 to 2. The Court ruled:

1. The Fire Insurance Policy Act was not ultra vires provincial jurisdiction and applied to all insurance companies that insured property within the province.
2. The Act was not a regulation of trade and commerce under s. 91(2) of the British North America Act, 1867.
3. Insurers in Ontario had to comply with the statutory conditions imposed under the Fire Insurance Policy Act. Failure to do so meant that the insurance company could not rely on restrictions on coverage set out in the Act.

As was the practice at that time, each judge wrote their own reasons, except for Justice Strong, who was present in arguments but absent for the judgment. He authorized Chief Justice Ritchie to state he concurred with the majority.

Ritchie CJ asserted that the regulation of insurance contracts fell under the provincial property and civil rights power:

If an insurance company is a trader, and the business it carries on is commercial, why should the local legislature, having legislative power over property and civil rights, and matters of a private and local character, not be enabled to say to such a company: "If you do business in the province of Ontario, and insure property situate here, we have legislative control over property and over the civil rights in the province, and will, under such power, for the protection of that property and the rights of the insured, define the conditions on which you shall deal with such property," it being possibly wholly unconnected with trade and commerce, as a private dwelling or farming establishment, and the person insured having possibly no connection with trade or commerce? How can it be said that such property and such civil rights or contract shall be outside of all local legislation, and so outside of all local legislative protection? If the business of insurance is connected with trade and commerce, the legislation we are now considering does not attempt to prohibit the carrying on of the business of insurance, but having the property and the civil rights of the people of the province confided to them this legislation, in relation thereto, is simply the protection of such property and of such rights.

Henri Elzéar Taschereau and John Wellington Gwynne, who dissented in the Supreme Court decision, advised Prime Minister John A. Macdonald to consider intervening if necessary to have the decision appealed to the Judicial Committee of the Privy Council. In particular, Gwynne said:

Citizens’ Insurance was the thin end of the wedge to bring about Provincial Sovereignty which I believe Mr. Mowat is labouring to do.

Citizens' Insurance appealed to the Privy Council, and Mowat asserted his influence on the case by having the province assume Parsons's costs and by briefing his lawyers to argue that the provincial legislative jurisdiction should be broadly defined, and the federal government could not encroach upon it.

== Decision of the Judicial Committee ==
The Supreme Court ruling was affirmed. The Queen's Bench verdict was reversed, however, because of outstanding questions as to the interpretation of certain interim notes and the matter was remitted back to that court for reconsideration.

British Judge Montague Smith noted as a general proposition that the British North America Act, 1867 must be interpreted as an ordinary statute.

As was the practice of the Judicial Committee at that time, Smith gave the decision for the entire committee, with no reasons from any of the other judges.

=== Trade and Commerce ===
The case largely turned on the issue of the law overlapping two heads of power. Smith focused on interpreting the Trade and Commerce power; he famously stated:

The words "regulation of trade and commerce," in their unlimited sense are sufficiently wide, if uncontrolled by the context and other parts of the Act, to include every regulation of trade ranging from political arrangements in regard to trade with foreign governments, requiring the sanction of parliament, down to minute rules for regulating particular trades.

...

But a consideration of the Act shows that the words were not used in this unlimited sense. In the first place the collocation of No. 2 with classes of subjects of national and general concern affords an indication that regulations relating to general trade and commerce were in the mind of the legislature, when conferring the power on the dominion Parliament. If the words had been intended to have the full scope of which in their literal meaning they are susceptible, the specific mention of several of the other classes of subjects enumerated in sect. 91 would have been unnecessary...

...

Construing therefore the words "regulation of trade and commerce" by the various aids to their interpretation above suggested, they would include political arrangements in regard to trade requiring the sanction of parliament, regulation in matters of inter-provincial concern, and it may be that they would include general regulation of trade affecting the whole dominion.

In all, Smith established three characteristics of the trade and commerce power:

1. The "regulation of trade and commerce" should not be read literally.
2. It includes international and interprovincial trade as well as "general regulation of trade affecting the whole dominion."
3. It does not extend to regulate contracts between businesses.

=== Incorporation of federal companies ===
Taschereau J, in his opinion, had expressed concern that if the Parliament of Canada did not possess the power to regulate companies under the trade and commerce power, it did not have the power to incorporate companies either. Smith declared that the federal incorporation power arose from s. 91's introductory words:

in relation to all Matters not coming within the Classes of Subjects by this Act assigned exclusively to the Legislatures of the Provinces

S. 92(11) gave the provincial legislatures power over "The Incorporation of Companies with Provincial Objects" so Smith declared:

... it follows that the incorporation of companies for objects other than provincial falls within the general powers of the Parliament of Canada.

However, the power to incorporate does not confer the exclusive right to regulate contracts.

== Significance of the decision ==
Parsons had constitutional and political consequences:

1. It circumscribed the influence of Taschereau and Gwynne JJ's highly centralist views in Canadian constitutional jurisprudence.
2. It significantly restricted the federal trade and commerce power for decades in Privy Council jurisprudence, which started to transform only in the 1970s, beginning with Caloil Inc. v. Canada and seeing change in General Motors of Canada Ltd. v. City National Leasing.
3. It represented a major victory in Mowat's championing of increased provincial rights, which received further support in forthcoming Privy Council appeals in other cases. They still influence Canadian political and constitutional debate.

This case is included in the three volume set of significant decisions of the Judicial Committee on the construction and interpretation of the British North America Act, 1867 (now the Constitution Act, 1867), prepared on the direction of the then Minister of Justice and Attorney General, Stuart Sinclair Garson, QC. He directed that the Department of Justice prepare the collection "for the convenience of the Bench and Bar in Canada", following the abolition of Canadian appeals to the Judicial Committee. This case was included in the first volume of the set.
