= Section 20 =

Section 20 may refer to:

- Section 20, fictional branch of the Secret Intelligence Service (MI6) in the Strike Back (TV series) universe
- Section Twenty of the Canadian Charter of Rights and Freedoms
- Section 20 of the Constitution Act, 1867, Canada
- Section 20 of the Indian Penal Code
- Significant sections numbered 20 in legislation:
  - Section 20A of the (South African) Sexual Offences Act, 1957
  - Section 20 of the UK's Children Act 1989
