= Section 20 of the Constitution Act, 1867 =

Provision of the Constitution of Canada

British North America Act, 1867

Section 20 of the Constitution Act, 1867 (French: article 20 de la Loi constitutionnelle de 1867) is a repealed provision of the Constitution of Canada, which required annual sittings of the Parliament of Canada. It was repealed in 1982 and replaced by a similar provision in the Canadian Charter of Rights and Freedoms.

The Constitution Act, 1867 is the constitutional statute which established Canada. Originally named the British North America Act, 1867, the Act continues to be the foundational statute for the Constitution of Canada, although it has been amended many times since 1867. It is now recognised as part of the supreme law of Canada.

== Constitution Act, 1867 ==
The Constitution Act, 1867 is part of the Constitution of Canada and thus part of the supreme law of Canada. The Act sets out the constitutional framework of Canada, including the structure of the federal government and the powers of the federal government and the provinces. It was the product of extensive negotiations between the provinces of British North America at the Charlottetown Conference in 1864, the Quebec Conference in 1864, and the London Conference in 1866. Those conferences were followed by consultations with the British government in 1867. The Act was then enacted in 1867 by the British Parliament under the name the British North America Act, 1867. In 1982 the Act was brought under full Canadian control through the Patriation of the Constitution, and was renamed the Constitution Act, 1867. Since Patriation the Act can only be amended in Canada, under the amending formula set out in the Constitution Act, 1982.

== Text of section 20 ==
Section 20 has been repealed. As originally enacted in 1867, it read:

Yearly Session of the Parliament of Canada
20 There shall be a Session of the Parliament of Canada once at least in every Year, so that Twelve Months shall not intervene between the last Sitting of the Parliament in one Session and its first Sitting in the next Session.

Section 20 was found in Part IV of the Constitution Act, 1867, dealing with the federal legislative power.

== Legislative history ==
Section 20 had its origins in the similar provisions in pre-Confederation Canada.

In 1791, the British Parliament passed the Constitutional Act 1791, which split the old Province of Quebec into Lower Canada and Upper Canada. Both of the new provinces had its own parliament, and each was required to meet annually. This provision in turn was carried forward in the Union Act, 1840, which reunited the two provinces into the Province of Canada.

The requirement for an annual sitting of Parliament was set out in resolution 28 of the Quebec Resolutions, produced by the Fathers of Confederation at the Quebec Conference in 1864. The provision was continued as resolution 27 of the London Resolutions at the London Conference in 1866.

The requirement was included in the rough draft of the bill, prepared by the sub-committee of the four provincial attorneys general after the close of the London Conference. (Note: The four attorneys general were John A. Macdonald, Canada West; George-Étienne Cartier, Canada East; William Alexander Henry, Nova Scotia; and Charles Fisher, New Brunswick.) It was modified in the initial draft, and was set in the final draft. It was then included as section 20 in the Constitution Act, 1867.

Section 20 only applied to Parliament; it did not apply to the provincial legislatures. It was repealed in 1982 and replaced by section 5 of the Canadian Charter of Rights and Freedoms, which requires that Parliament and each provincial legislature must sit at least once every twelve months.

== Purpose and interpretation ==
The requirement for annual meetings of Parliament evolved gradually in England and then Great Britain. The Triennial Acts, passed in the 17th century, established that Parliament must be elected at least once every three years. The need for the government to pass financial measures had the practical effect of requiring that Parliaments actually meet at least once a year, although that requirement was not included in the Triennial Act 1694. Section 20 codified the British practice. The need for an annual sitting to implement the government's financial plans and needs continues today.

== Related provisions of the Constitution Act, 1867 ==
Section 38 provides that the Governor General can summon the House of Commons.

Section 50 provides that the House of Commons shall not last for more than five years from the last election.

Section 86 provides for annual sittings of the legislatures of Ontario and Quebec.
