= Supreme Court Reports (Canada) =

Official reporter of decisions

The Supreme Court Reports (S.C.R.) is the official reporter of the Supreme Court of Canada. Since the creation of the Supreme Court, all of its decisions have been published in the Reports. After 1970, decisions in the reports were published in both English and French. Prior to 1970, decisions were published in the language used by the individual justice. The first volume was published in 1877 containing the first case ever heard by the Supreme Court, Kelly v. Sullivan.

Initially, the reports were identified from 1 to 64, but from 1923 they have been identified by their year of publication. By 1975 the reporter started putting out two volumes a year, which increased to between 3 and 4 by 1990. Volumes from 1983 and later are also available in electronic format, hosted by LexUM at the Université de Montréal.

== History ==
=== 19th century ===
In 1875, the Supreme Court of Canada was established by Parliament as nation's centralizing court of appeal under the authority of section 101 of the Constitution Act, 1867, and the Supreme Court Act. The Supreme Court Act included a requirement that the Court publish its own decisions rather than relying on private law reporters, an innovation not found elsewhere in the British Empire. The self-publishing model was intended to ensure that decisions would quickly reach legal professionals and lower court judges.

Judgments published in the Supreme Court Reports were printed in the language in which they were delivered, either English or French, and were not translated. Despite its promise, the Supreme Court Reports faced early criticism for numerous shortcomings, including errors, inconsistent editing and citations, a lack of uniform style, poorly written headnotes, and delays from decision to date of publication.

Another issue arose in the 1891 case Stephens v McArthur, (Note: Stephens v McArthur, 1891 CanLII 63, [1891] 19 SCR 446, Supreme Court (Canada)) where the judgement affected the validity of every mortgage and bill of sale in the prairies. The Law Society of Manitoba requested a copy of the decision to print in the Western Law Times, but Justice Samuel Henry Strong who wrote the majority opinion refused the request until the decision had been printed in the Supreme Court Reports.

The problems with the Supreme Court Reports continued into the 1890s with the Strong Court. However, the retirement of the original Reporter Georges Duval in 1895, and replacement with Charles H. Masters and assistant reporter Louis William Coutlée led to an improvement in efficiency and reporting processes. The Department of Justice permitted the Reporter to print without inclusion of reasons from justices which were late with their reasons. In the 25th volume (1895), six decisions were reported without reasons for a justice, and two unanimous decisions were reported with no reasons. While this change increased efficiency, the quality of the reporting made the Reports unhelpful for the legal profession.

=== Early 20th century ===
In 1905, the Court addressed printing problems of the Supreme Court Reports by shifting to a private publishing firm. Private printing lasted until 1920, when the government took over publication and made the reports available on a subsidized mass subscription basis. By the late-1920s, the average print run for the reports was 6,500 copies, with 5,500 distributed on a subscription basis.

In the early 1900s, the Registrar blamed delays in publication on the justices themselves, noting that he was unable to print until each judge had provided written reasons. It was common at this time to begin drafting written reasons after an oral judgement was made, meaning there could be a delay of weeks until the Registrar had the materials necessary to report the decision.

The Taschereau Court continued to have problems with drafting decisions for publication. In The King v Stewart, the 3–1 majority dismissed the appeal and cross-appeal, but no written reasons were provided. In contrast Taschereau provided a detailed dissent which was reported in the Supreme Court Reports. (Note: The King v Stewart, 1902 CanLII 79, (1902) 32 SCR 483, Supreme Court (Canada)) Later, the Fitzpatrick Court majority in McKee v Philip provided brief reasons, while Justice Lyman Duff wrote a 14 page dissent. (Note: McKee v Philip, 1916 CanLII 38, (1916) 55 SCR 286, Supreme Court (Canada))

Any justice of the Court could request a decision be reported, but generally the decision to report a case was made by the Chief Justice. At times the Department of Justice requested the registrar to report a case, but that came with varying success.

In 1923, the Supreme Court and Exchequer Court reports were combined into a new series called the Canada Law Reports. Registrar Edward Robert Cameron sought to centralize the publication of all provincial law reporters with the federal law reports, and in the late-1920s he traveled to meet various bar associations to advocate for the new system of reports. However, the project was not adopted.

The Reports did suffer from some weakness. If a public citation series was available, the Court would use that citation in the decision, often omitting the popular Dominion Law Reports. Additionally, the Supreme Court Reports did not publish every decision, and in 1924, the Dominion Law Reports reported 17 decisions that were omitted from the Supreme Court Reports.

In the early 1950s, complaints about the Supreme Court Reports came from both the public and the justices. The common law justices were described as "extremely dissatisfied" with the headnotes prepared by the reporters. The justices also sought to include counsel's arguments in the reported decisions. In 1956, Alan Burnside Harvey, considered one of Canada's best reporters and editor of Tremeear's Criminal Code and the Law Society of Upper Canada's Reports, was persuaded to move from Toronto to Ottawa and assume the newly created role of deputy registrar and reporter. Under Harvey, complaints about the Reports ended, but returned after his death in 1960.

=== 21st century ===
In 2005, the order of reporting the decisions of individual justices was changed. Previously, the written decisions were listed in order of seniority of the justice, with the decision of the Chief Justice was the first decision listed, whether or not the Chief Justice's opinion was in the majority. After 2005, the reported judgement is first, any concurrences are reported second, and dissents reported third.

== Registrars of the Supreme Court of Canada ==
The publication of the Supreme Court Reports are overseen by the Registrar of the Supreme Court.

| Registrar | Start date | End date |
|---|---|---|
| Robert Cassels, Q.C. | October 8, 1875 | June 17, 1898 |
| Edward Robert Cameron, K.C. | July 2, 1898 | 1930 |
| James F. Smellie, K.C. | 1930 | 1940 |
| Paul Leduc, K.C. | 1940 | 1958 |
| Alan Burnside-Harvey, Q.C. | 1958 | 1958 |
| Kenneth J. Matheson, Q.C. | 1958 | 1972 |
| François Des Rivières, Q.C. | 1972 | 1976 |
| Gérard Bertrand, Q.C. | 1976 | 1978 |
| Bernard C. Hofley, Q.C. | 1978 | 1985 |
| Guy Y. Goulard, Q.C. | 1985 | 1990 |
| Anne Roland | 1990 | 2008 |
| Roger Bilodeau, Q.C. | 2009 | 2020 |
| David Power (Acting registrar) | 2020 | 2021 |
| Chantal Carbonneau | 2021 | Incumbent |

| Reporters | Start date | End date |
|---|---|---|
| George Duval | January 20, 1876 | June 2, 1895 |
| Charles Harding Masters | October 2, 1895 | 1930 |
| A.E. Richard | 1947 | |
| François Des Rivières | 1947 | |
