= Attorney General of Ontario v Mercer =

Canadian constitutional law case – 1883

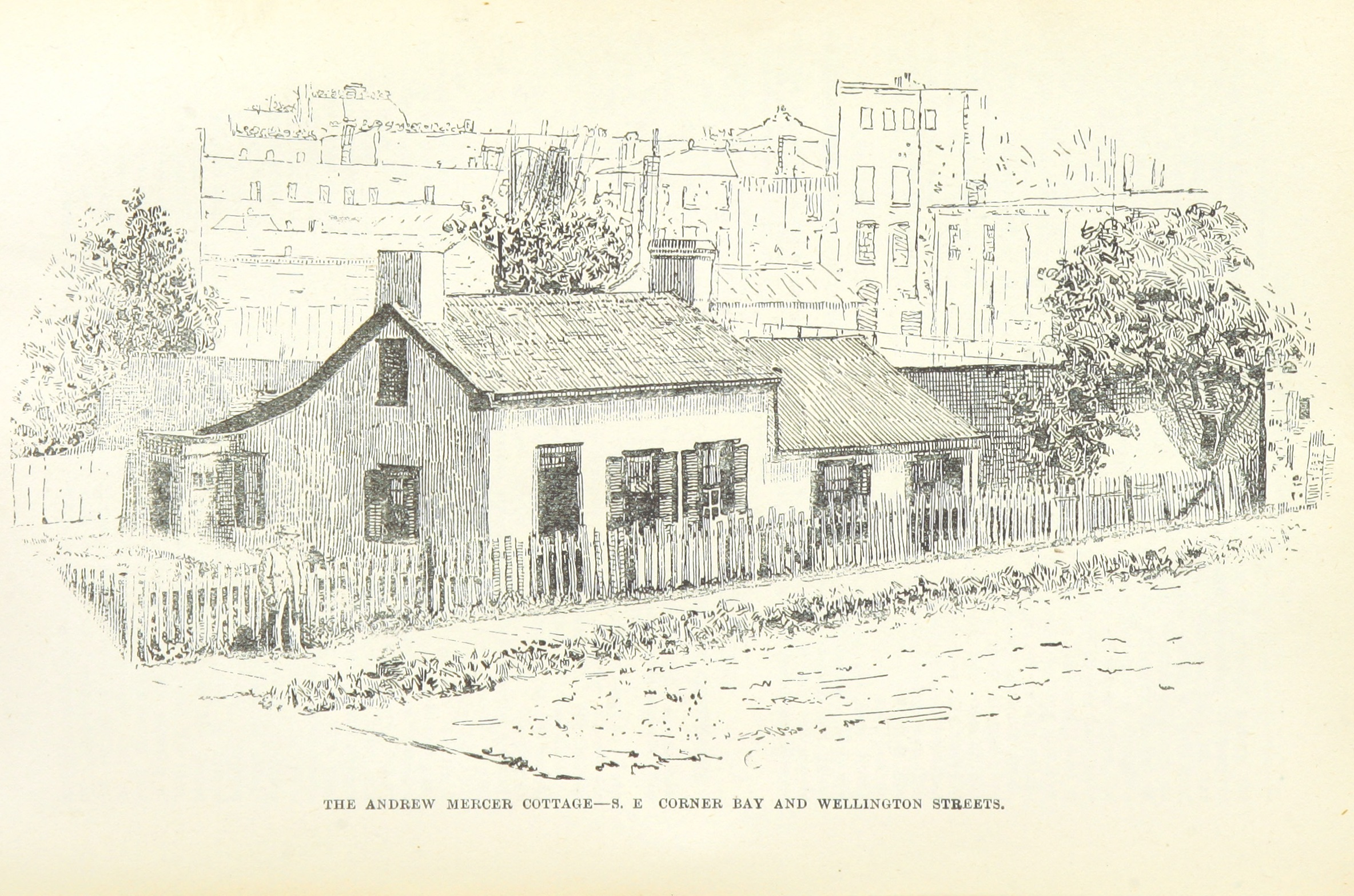
- Andrew Mercer's cottage, near Bay and Wellington Streets, Toronto
- Court: Judicial Committee of the Privy Council
- Full case name: Attorney General of Ontario v Andrew F. Mercer
- Decided: July 18, 1883
- Citations: [1883] UKPC 42, 8 App Cas 767

Case history
- Prior actions: Mercer v. Attorney General for Ontario, (1881) 5 SCR 538
- Appealed from: Supreme Court of Canada

Court membership
- Judges sitting: The Earl of Selborne, Lord Chancellor; Sir Barnes Peacock; Sir Montague Smith; Sir Robert P. Collier; Sir Richard Couch; Sir Arthur Hobhouse

Case opinions
- Decision by: The Lord Chancellor

Keywords
- Constitutional law, Crown prerogatives, escheat

Attorney General of Ontario v Mercer is a Canadian constitutional law decision of the Judicial Committee of the Privy Council in 1883, at that time the highest court of appeal in the British Empire, including Canada.

The issue in the case arose from the death of an individual, Andrew Mercer, without a will and without any heirs recognised by law. At common law, if an individual dies without heirs and without a will, the property in the estate vests in the Crown, called an "escheat". Both the federal government and the provincial government claimed the property, each relying on different sections of the British North America Act, 1867 (now known as the Constitution Act, 1867).

The dispute was litigated in the courts of Ontario and then the Supreme Court of Canada. The Ontario courts ruled in favour of the province, and the Supreme Court ruled in favour of the federal government. The Attorney General of Ontario, Oliver Mowat, QC, then appealed to the Judicial Committee, which held that the right of escheat fell to the provinces, not to the federal government.

The case is included in a collection of significant constitutional decisions from the Judicial Committee, published by the federal Department of Justice.

== Facts of the case ==
Andrew Mercer was born in England, likely around 1780. He emigrated from England to Upper Canada in 1800, accompanying Thomas Scott, the newly appointed Attorney General of Upper Canada. Mercer once stated that his mother was unmarried, and there was speculation that Mercer was Scott's illegitimate son. Upon arriving at York, Upper Canada, Scott retained Mercer as his secretary.

Mercer lived in York (now Toronto, Ontario) for the rest of his life. He held a variety of government positions, as well as engaging in some business ventures, including offering loans. He was said to be "almost parsimonious". He owned a small house near Bay Street and Wellington Street. In 1850, he hired a new housekeeper, Bridget O'Reilly, who was described by Mercer's biographer as "violent-tempered, illiterate, and thieving". She remained his housekeeper until the end of his life. In 1851, she gave birth to a boy, commonly believed to be Mercer's son, who was christened Andrew Francis Mercer. Mercer provided support for the boy as he grew up and gave him a plot of land, but never included him in a will. Mercer was reputed to have said that he "would leave his money to the government."

== Decisions of the Canadian courts ==
=== Probate ===
Mercer died in 1871, leaving an estate valued in the neighbourhood of $180,000, made up of stocks, land, mortgages and other loans owing to him. Since there did not appear to be a will, the Attorney General of Ontario, Oliver Mowat, was appointed as administrator of the estate and began probate proceedings in the Ontario Court of Chancery. In 1875, Bridget O'Reilly and Andrew Francis Mercer claimed as Mercer's heirs, with O'Reilly suddenly producing a marriage certificate dated one month before Andrew Francis's birth, and an apparent will, leaving the entire estate to the two of them. Attorney General Mowat contested the validity of the will.

O'Reilly and Andrew Francis Mercer called as witnesses the Roman Catholic archbishop, John Lynch, and also a well-known local figure, John Montgomery. However, Andrew Francis Mercer declined to testify on his own behalf. Attorney General Mowat's lawyer was a leading barrister in Toronto, John Beverley Robinson, who had earlier convicted Montgomery of treason in relation to the 1837 Rebellion, and sentenced him to death, although the sentence was later commuted. The probate case came on before Vice-Chancellor Samuel Blake, who ruled that the marriage certificate and the will were both forgeries.

=== Escheat proceedings ===
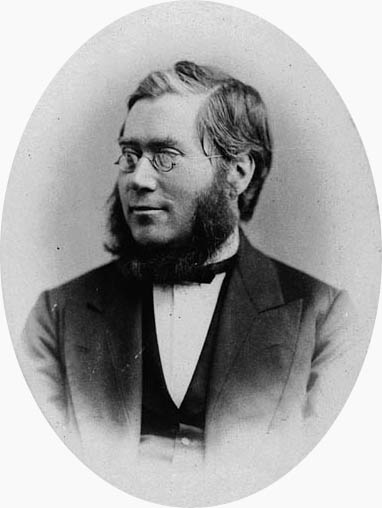
Oliver Mowat, Attorney General for Ontario, who began the escheat proceedings

After the probate decision, Attorney General Mowat began proceedings in the Court of Chancery to claim the lands in Mercer's estate, asserting that since he had died intestate and without any known heirs, the land escheated to the province of Ontario. Andrew Francis Mercer contested the application, arguing that the provincial Escheats Act was unconstitutional because escheats were a matter of federal law, not provincial. Now sitting on the escheats issue, Vice-Chancellor Blake rejected that application. Andrew Francis Mercer appealed to the Ontario Court of Appeal, which dismissed the appeal.

Andrew Francis Mercer then appealed to the Supreme Court of Canada. The dispute was now seen as a major case in relation to the powers of the federal government and the provincial governments. The Attorney General of Canada joined in the appeal, arguing that escheats of land were within federal jurisdiction, not provincial, and therefore the land should escheat to the federal government. Attorney General Mowat opposed the appeal. The Attorney General of Quebec intervened in the case, in support of provincial jurisdiction.

All of the parties were represented by senior counsel. The Deputy Minister of Justice, Zebulon Aiton Lash, QC, argued the case for the federal government, while William McDougall, QC, a Father of Confederation and former federal Cabinet minister, argued for Andrew Francis Mercer. The Attorney General for Ontario was represented by Edward Blake, QC, one of the leading Ontario barristers, formerly Premier of Ontario, formerly federal Attorney General, and brother of Vice-Chancellor Blake, whose decision was under appeal. Blake was joined by James Bethune, QC, of his firm. The Attorney General of Quebec, Louis-Onésime Loranger, personally argued the position of Quebec.

All counsel made extensive arguments, ranging over the feudal origins of property under English law, Crown prerogatives, the constitutional history of the British North American provinces up to Confederation, and the powers of the federal and provincial governments under the British North America Act, 1867 (now known as the Constitution Act, 1867). McDougall, counsel for Andrew Francis Mercer, advised the Court that his client favoured the federal government because he understood that the federal government would likely transfer all of the property to him if the courts ruled that escheats were federal, under a pre-Confederation policy that the federal government would respect.

The Supreme Court allowed the appeal by a majority of four judges, with two dissenting. The four judges in the majority (Justices Fournier, Henry, Taschereau and Gwynne) agreed that the right of escheat is one of the royal prerogatives and a form of revenue. It therefore was a federal matter under s. 102 of the Constitution Act, 1867 which assigned revenues to the federal government. As well, they questioned whether the provinces could benefit from the royal prerogative of escheats, since they considered the Crown was represented by the federal government, and not by the provinces.

The two dissenting judges, Chief Justice Ritchie and Justice Strong, took the view that escheats were part of property in land, and therefore assigned to the provinces by s. 109 of the Constitution Act, 1867. Section 109 provides that the provinces continued to hold "All Lands, Mines, Minerals, and Royalties" belonging to the provinces before Confederation, which would include the Crown’s right of escheat in land. They would have upheld the constitutionality of the provincial statute.

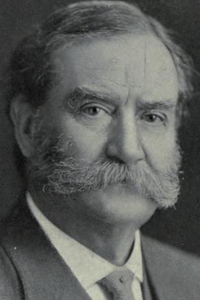
Zebulon Lash, QC, Deputy Attorney General of Canada

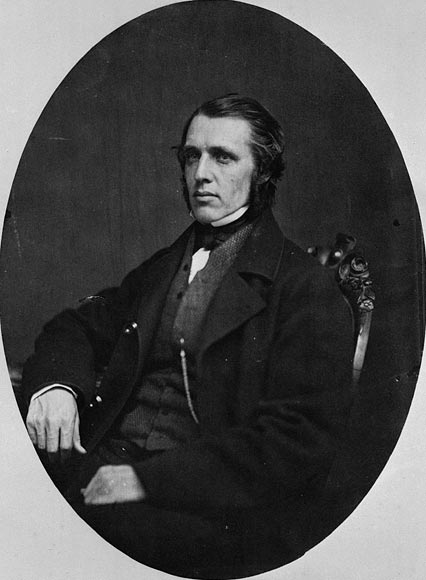
William McDougall, QC, counsel for Andrew Francis Mercer

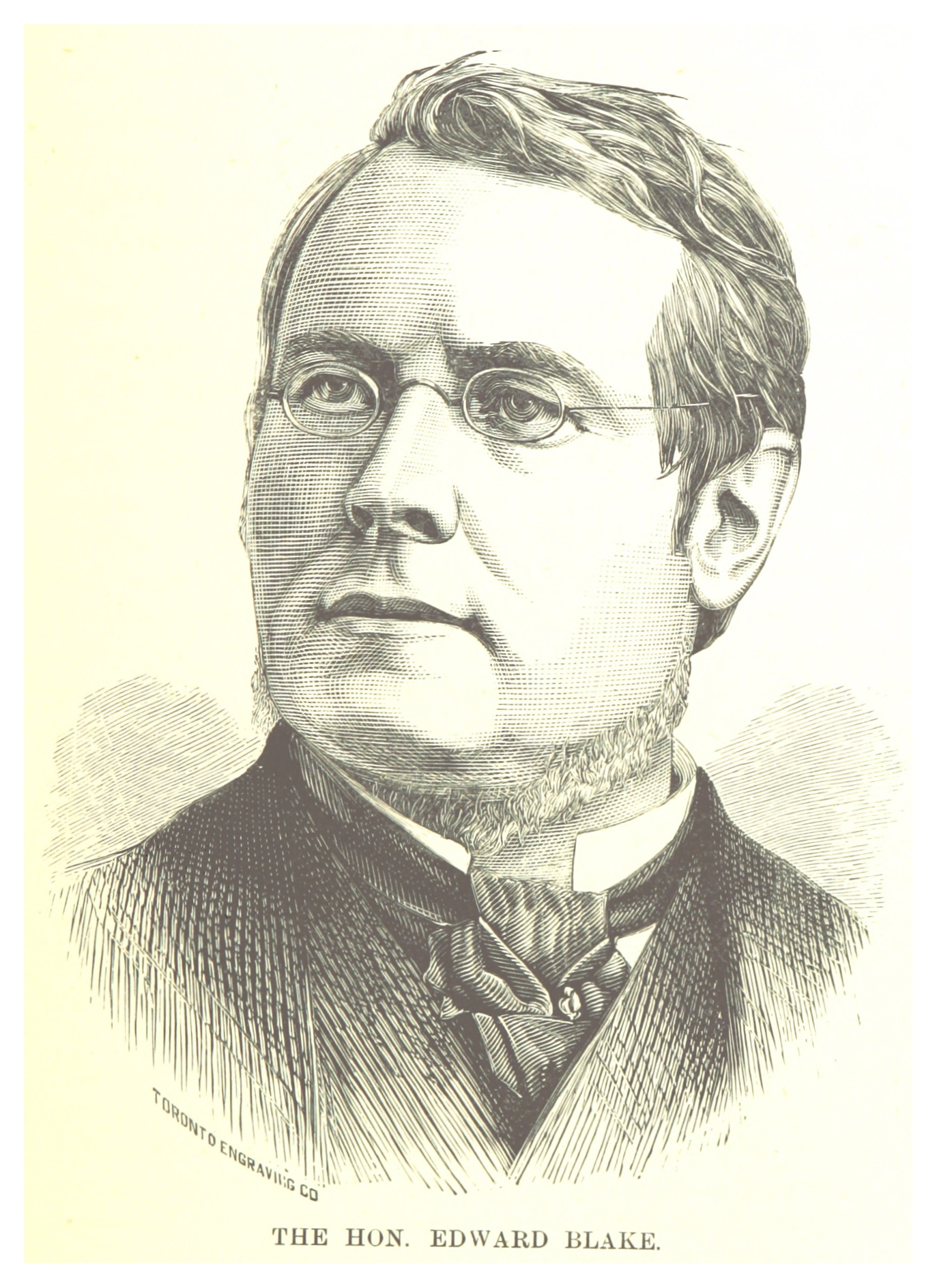
Edward Blake, QC, counsel for Ontario

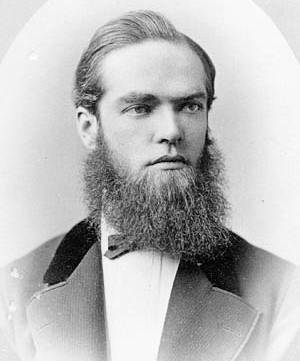
James Bethune, QC, also counsel for Ontario

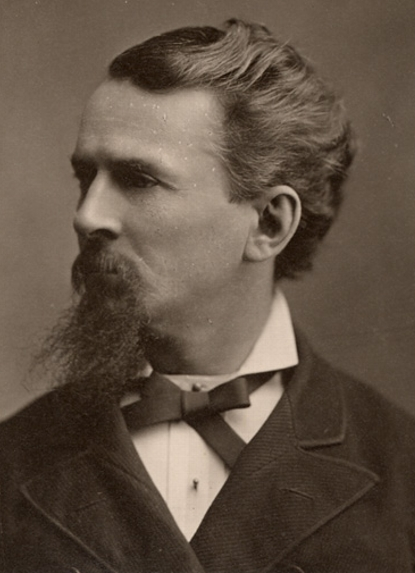
Louis-Onézime Loranger, Attorney General for Quebec

== Decision of the Judicial Committee ==
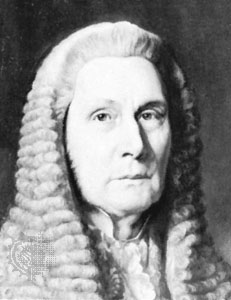
The Earl of Selborne, Lord Chancellor of England, who gave judgment in favour of Ontario

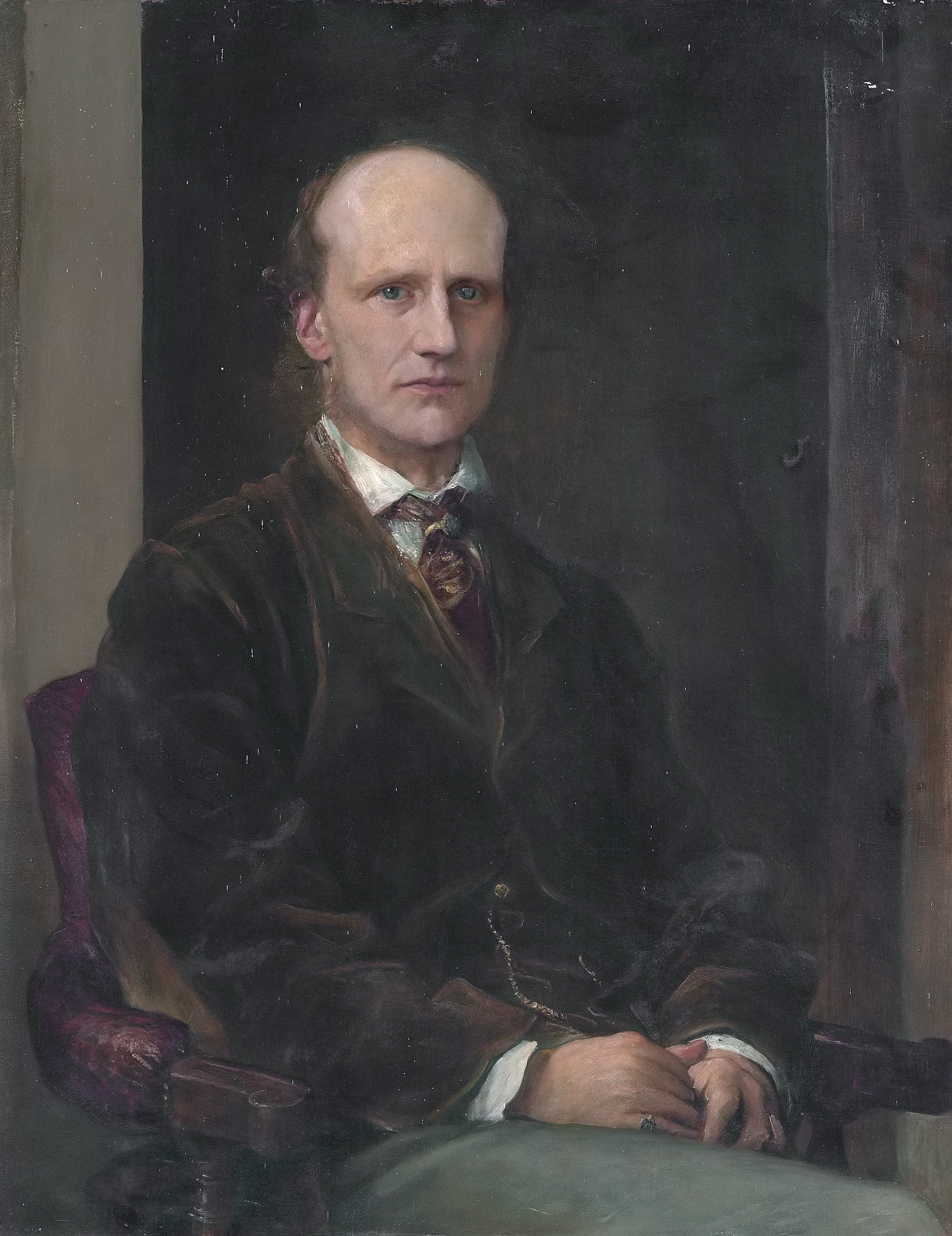
Horace Davey, counsel for Ontario

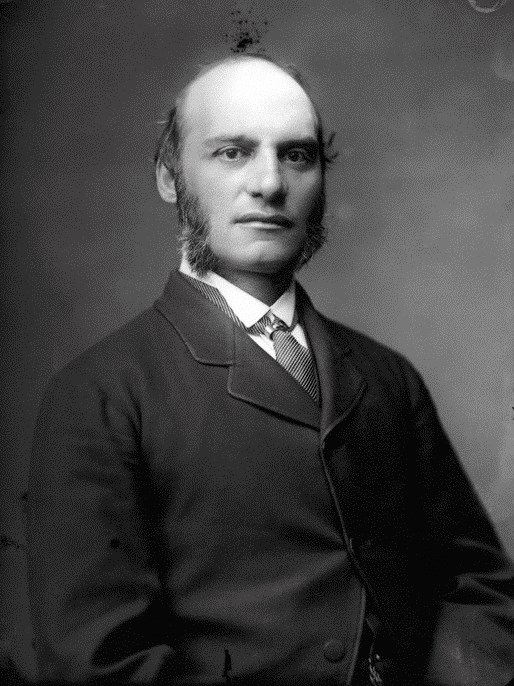
Farrer Herschell, Solicitor General for England and counsel for the federal government

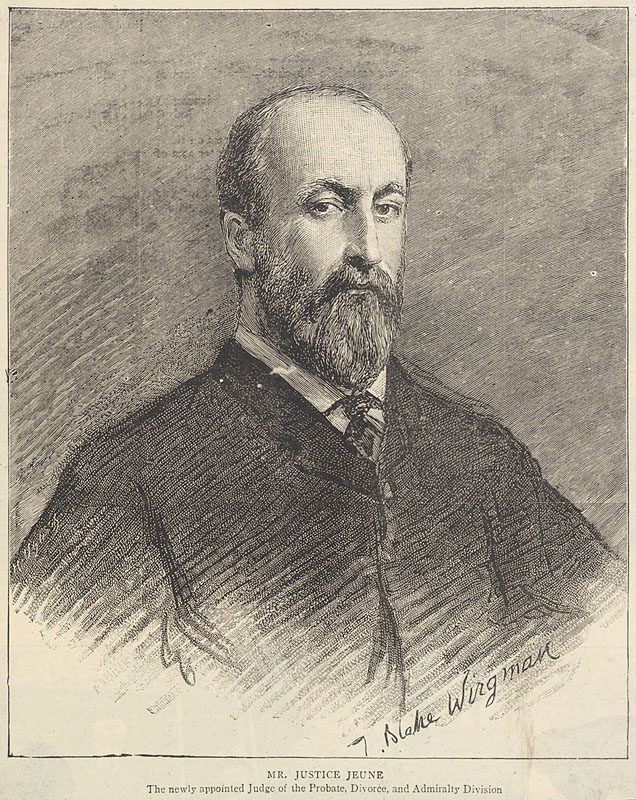
Francis Jeune, junior counsel for the federal government

Attorney General Mowat appealed to the Judicial Committee. Mowat appeared personally to argue the appeal, along with Horace Davey, QC, a leading member of the English bar, and two junior counsel, one from Canada and one from England. The federal government, handling the appeal on behalf of Andrew F. Mercer, was represented by the Solicitor General for England, Farrer Herschell, QC. Zebulon Lash, now in private practice, also appeared for the federal government, although Prime Minister John A. Macdonald did not consider him "heavy metal". Francis Jeune appeared as junior counsel for the federal government.

Lord Selbourne, the Lord Chancellor, gave the decision of the Judicial Committee in favour of Ontario's appeal. An expert in equity law, he reviewed the historical origins of the doctrine of escheat, as an aspect of feudal tenure and the position of the Crown as the ultimate lord of the property. If there was a complete failure of the tenant's line, the land escheats, or returns to the Crown. The income from an escheat was one of the casual revenues of the Crown.

He then turned to the major issue: was an escheat part of the revenues assigned to the federal government by s. 102 of the Constitution Act, 1867, or was it one of the types of property reserved to the provinces by s. 109 of the act? He noted that s. 102 stated that the revenues transferred to the federal government did not include revenues that the Act "reserved to the respective Legislatures of the Provinces". He concluded that phrase referred to the "lands, mines, minerals, and royalties" held by the provinces under s. 109 of the Act. Finally, he held that the escheat of land was one of the "royalties" included in s. 109. The escheat in land therefore belonged to Ontario, as held by the Ontario courts.

As was the practice of the Judicial Committee at that time, Selborne gave the decision for the entire committee, with no reasons from any of the other judges.

== Significance of the decision ==
Much of the estate was spent on the legal costs. Following the decision, Mowat agreed to give Andrew Francis Mercer $30,000 from the proceeds of the estate, but most of that went to cover his legal expenses. The government used $10,000 of the proceeds to set up the Andrew Mercer Eye and Ear Infirmary at the Toronto General Hospital. Another amount, $106,000, was used to set up the Andrew Mercer Ontario Reformatory for Females. The Reformatory opened in 1880 and continued in operation until 1969.

Mercer was the first occasion that a constitutional decision of the Supreme Court of Canada was overturned by the Privy Council. The Supreme Court has cited Attorney General of Ontario v Mercer several times since it was decided, most recently in 2002.

This case is included in the three volume set of significant decisions of the Judicial Committee on the construction and interpretation of the Constitution Act, 1867, prepared on the direction of the then Minister of Justice and Attorney General, Stuart Sinclair Garson, QC. Following the abolition of Canadian appeals to the Judicial Committee, Garson directed that the Department of Justice prepare the collection "for the convenience of the Bench and Bar in Canada". This case was included in the first volume of the set.
