= James Robert Gowan =

Canadian lawyer, judge and senator (1815–1909)

The Honourable Sir James Robert Gowan KCMG KC
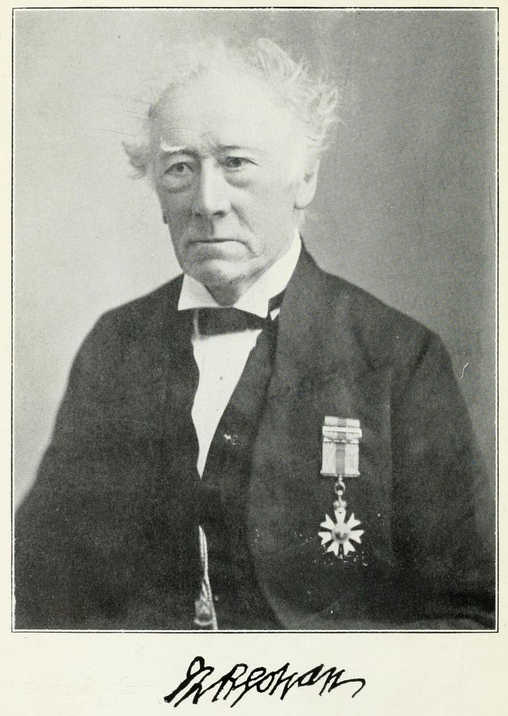

Canadian Senator from Ontario
- In office 29 January 1885 – February 1907
- Appointed by: John A. Macdonald

Personal details
- Born: 22 December 1815 Cahore, County Wexford, Ireland
- Died: 18 March 1909 (aged 93) Barrie, Ontario, Canada
- Party: Liberal-Conservative

Sir James Robert Gowan, KCMG, KC (22 December 1815 – 18 March 1909) was a Canadian lawyer, judge, and senator.

== Background ==
Born in Cahore, County Wexford, Ireland, the son of Henry Hatton Gowan and Elizabeth Burkitt, he was educated privately in Dublin. In 1832, he emigrated to Canada and settled outside of Toronto. In 1833, he became a student in the law office of James Edward Small and later practised law there. He married Anne Ardagh in 1854. They had no children. In 1843, he was appointed judge of the newly created Simcoe District, the largest jurisdiction in Upper Canada. He was the youngest judge ever commissioned in the British empire at the time. In 1873, he was a member of the royal commission which inquired into the Pacific Scandal. He retired in 1883. In 1885, he was appointed a Senator on the advice of John Alexander Macdonald representing the senatorial division of Barrie, Ontario.

Gowan was one of the Conservative Party's chief advisors on legal matters during his time in the Senate. He was particularly opposed to the appointment of Samuel Henry Strong as the third Chief Justice of the Supreme Court of Canada, writing Justice Minister John Sparrow David Thompson to delay the appointment due to Strong's perceived poor work ethic and interpersonal skills.

A Liberal-Conservative, he served for twenty-two years, until resigning in 1907. He was created a C.M.G. in 1893 and knighted in 1905.

He was related to Ogle Robert Gowan, Emily Gowan Murphy née Ferguson, and Thomas Roberts Ferguson.

== Archives ==
There is a James Robert Gowan fonds at Library and Archives Canada. There is also a Gowan family fonds at the Archives of Ontario.
