= James Smellie =

- Born: 1869; Glasgow, Scotland
- Died: February 28, 1944 (aged 74–75); Ottawa, Ontario, Canada
- Education: Queen's University
- Occupations: athlete, lawyer

James Forman Smellie (1869 – February 28, 1944) was a Scottish-Canadian lawyer and athlete. In the 1890s, Smellie was an early ice hockey player who played for Queen's University, Osgoode Hall and the Ottawa Hockey Club and was one of the founders of the Ontario Hockey Association. He played football with Queen's, Osgoode and later joined the Ottawa Rough Riders. He was a lawyer first in Toronto, then Ottawa, eventually becoming Chief Registrar of the Supreme Court of Canada.

Smellie was born in Glasgow, Scotland, the child of parents William Baillie Smellie and Maria Chipman Lovett. He was educated at Lincoln College School and graduated with honours from Queen's University in Kingston, Ontario in 1890. He entered Osgoode Law School and was called to the bar in 1894. He was a partner with the firm Lewis & Smellie and later practised alone. He was named Chief Registrar of the Supreme Court in 1930.

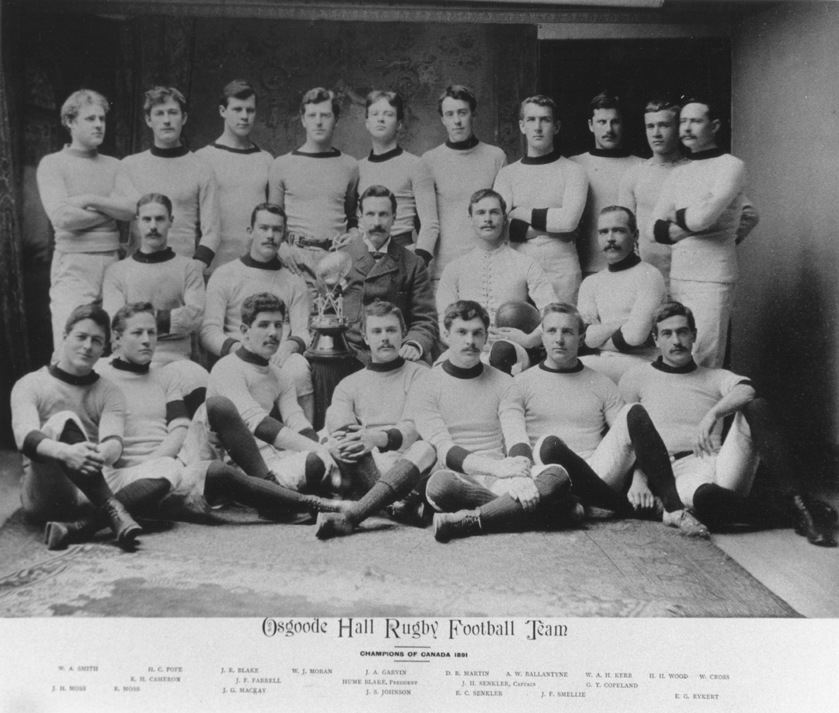
Osgoode Hall 1891 team

Smellie played ice hockey and football for Queen's University and was the institution's representative at the founding of the Ontario Hockey Association in 1890. Smellie then played hockey for Osgoode Hall until 1894. He played one more season of ice hockey and played in two games for the Ottawa Hockey Club. He played rugby football for Osgoode Hall in 1891 and 1892, when the team won the Canadian Dominion Championship. After Osgoode, he joined the Ottawa Football Club, nicknamed the Rough Riders. He became the captain of the team. He was remembered as an outstanding quarterback by Bill Birtles, recalling Smellie's play in the 1892 Canadian Dominion Championship of football in 1892, where he led Osgoode to a 45–5 win over Montreal.

In 1904, Smellie married Amy Maud Vernon Ritchie, daughter of Supreme Court of Canada Chief Justice William Ritchie. They had two children, Sylvia Smellie and Peter Smellie. Smellie suffered a heart attack while walking on Elgin Street outside the Lord Elgin Hotel. He was taken to his home at 129 Cooper Street, where he died. At the time of death, he was a member of the Ottawa Country Club, the Royal Ottawa Golf Club and the Rideau Club. He was a director for the Ottawa Electric Railway Company. He was buried in Beechwood Cemetery in Ottawa.
