= Section 38 of the Constitution Act, 1867 =

Provision of the Constitution of Canada

British North America Act, 1867

Section 38 of the Constitution Act, 1867 (French: Article 38 de la Loi constitutionnelle de 1867) is a provision of the Constitution of Canada, giving the Governor General of Canada the power to summon the House of Commons, the lower house of the Parliament of Canada.

The Constitution Act, 1867 is the constitutional statute which established Canada. Originally named the British North America Act, 1867, the Act continues to be the foundational statute for the Constitution of Canada, although it has been amended many times since 1867. It is now recognised as part of the supreme law of Canada.

== Constitution Act, 1867 ==
The Constitution Act, 1867 is part of the Constitution of Canada and thus part of the supreme law of Canada. The Act sets out the constitutional framework of Canada, including the structure of the federal government and the powers of the federal government and the provinces. It was the product of extensive negotiations between the provinces of British North America at the Charlottetown Conference in 1864, the Quebec Conference in 1864, and the London Conference in 1866. Those conferences were followed by consultations with the British government in 1867. The Act was then enacted by the British Parliament under the name the British North America Act, 1867. In 1982 the Act was brought under full Canadian control through the Patriation of the Constitution, and was renamed the Constitution Act, 1867. Since Patriation, the Act can only be amended in Canada, under the amending formula set out in the Constitution Act, 1982.

== Text of section 38 ==
Section 38 reads:

Summoning of House of Commons
38 The Governor General shall from Time to Time, in the Queen’s Name, by Instrument under the Great Seal of Canada, summon and call together the House of Commons.

Section 38 is found in Part IV of the Constitution Act, 1867, dealing with the legislative power of the federal Parliament. It has never been amended.

== Legislative history ==
There was no equivalent provision to section 38 in either the Quebec Resolutions of 1864 or the London Resolutions of 1866.

The first provision which referred to the power of the Governor General to summon Parliament was in the rough draft of the British North America bill, prepared by the four provincial attorneys general after the London Resolutions had been finalised. (Note: The four attorneys general were John A. Macdonald, Canada West; George-Étienne Cartier, Canada East; William Alexander Henry, Nova Scotia; and Charles Fisher, New Brunswick.) The rough draft contained a provision authorising the Governor General to summon the Parliament for the first time, after the proposed act came into force, but no mention of an ongoing power. The next draft had no equivalent provision.

The third draft provided that the Governor General was to summon the first Parliament within a set time after the act came into force, but added that the Governor General had the power "thereafter from time to time ... to summon and call together a House of Commons in and for Canada." Similar wording was used in the fourth draft.

Finally, in the fifth draft, the provision for the first general election was split off from the general power of the Governor General to summon the House of Commons. The general power to summon the House of Commons became section 38 of the Act, while section 19 required that the first Parliament be summoned within six months of the act coming into force.

== Purpose and interpretation ==
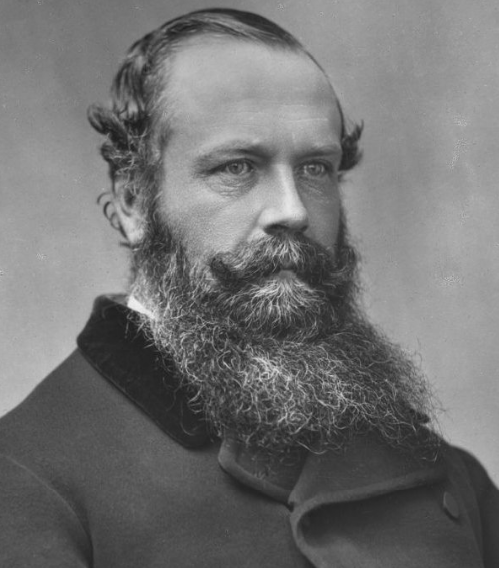
Governor General Lord Monck, who summoned the first Parliament of Canada in 1867

Parliament does not sit continuously. The Senate is a continuing body, but the House of Commons is elected periodically in a general election. Following a general election, the newly elected House of Commons is summoned by the Governor General under this section, on the advice of the prime minister. As well, Parliament must meet annually, and can be summoned by the Governor General under this section if it has been prorogued. The Governor General again acts on the advice of the prime minister in exercising this power.

Each House of Commons lasts for no more than five years, and can be dissolved by the Governor General prior to the expiry of the five-year term, again on the advice of the prime minister.

== Related provisions of the Constitution Act, 1867 ==
Section 19 of the Act required the Governor General to summon the first Parliament within six months of the date the Act came into force.

Section 50 sets out the five-year term for the House of Commons, and mentions the power of the Governor General to dissolve the House of Commons prior to the end of the five-year term.

Section 82 sets out the power of the Lieutenant Governors of Ontario and Quebec to summon the Legislative Assemblies of those provinces.
