= Samuel Henry Strong =

Chief Justice of Canada from 1892 to 1902

The Right Honourable Samuel Henry Strong PC
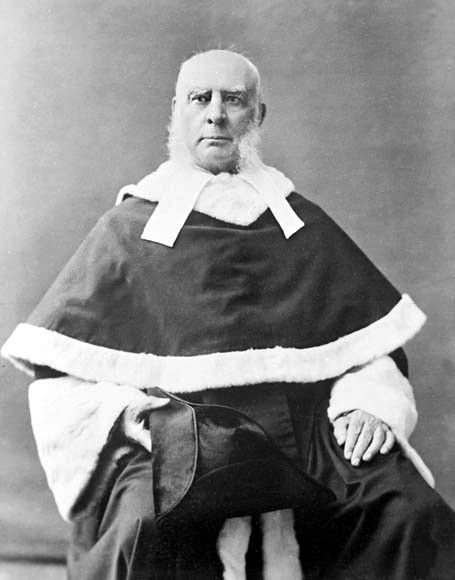
- Strong in October 1895

3rd Chief Justice of Canada
- In office December 13, 1892 – November 18, 1902
- Nominated by: John Thompson
- Preceded by: William Johnstone Ritchie
- Succeeded by: Henri Elzéar Taschereau

Puisne Justice of the Supreme Court of Canada
- In office September 30, 1875 – December 13, 1892
- Nominated by: Alexander Mackenzie
- Preceded by: None (new position)
- Succeeded by: Robert Sedgewick

Personal details
- Born: August 13, 1825 Poole, Dorset, England
- Died: August 31, 1909 (aged 84) Ottawa, Ontario
- Resting place: Beechwood Cemetery, Ottawa
- Spouse: Elizabeth Charlotte Cane

Samuel Henry Strong PC (August 13, 1825 – August 31, 1909) was an English–Canadian lawyer and judge who served as the third Chief Justice of Canada from 1892 to 1902. He was among the original six justices appointed to the Supreme Court of Canada when it was established in 1875.

Born in Poole, England, Strong immigrated to Upper Canada with his family in 1836. He was called to the bar in 1849, and practiced primarily in Toronto where he gained distinction as an expert in the law of equity. A legal adviser to Prime Minister John A. Macdonald, Strong was responsible for drafting the first legislative proposal to establish a national supreme court. He was appointed to the bench in 1869, and later the Ontario Court of Error and Appeal in 1874, before his appointment to the Supreme Court of Canada in 1875.

As a member of the Supreme Court, Strong was known for his deep legal knowledge and analytical skill, but also for his abrasive personality that created internal divisions between justices of the Court. Strong's period as Chief Justice was marked with inter-personal conflict, poor quality judicial decision-making, and supremacy of the Judicial Committee of the Privy Council in defining Canada's constitution.

== Early life ==
Samuel Henry Strong was born on August 13, 1825, in Poole, England, to Samuel Spratt Strong and Jane Elizabeth Gosse. In 1836, the Strong family immigrated to Upper Canada, and the following year, Strong's father was ordained as an Anglican priest and began a series of clerical appointments, first serving as a curate in Kingston, then as chaplain to the military in Quebec City, and, from 1837 onward, as rector in Hull and Bytown (now Ottawa).

Strong attended Quebec High School, and later continued his studies under private tutors. During his youth in Bytown, Strong was at times associated with the Shiners, a group involved in labor disputes and violence. He also became active in the Orange Order, rising to the rank of lodge master. Strong reportedly took an active part in the 1849 Stony Monday Riot, arising from the Rebellion Losses Bill and the proposed inspection of Bytown by Lord Elgin for a new permanent capital for the Province of Canada.

== Legal career ==
He later began legal training in the office of Augustus Keefer, a prominent lawyer in Bytown. Strong kept term at Osgoode Hall in Toronto, and spent time attending court sessions to observe legal arguments and courtroom procedures firsthand. During this time Strong was known to focus on studying and did not make many friends. Early in his career he had an altercation with a police officer that ended in a fight. This altercation led to Strong's first legal appearance, where he gave a "brilliant defence" resulting in the case being dismissed, and the police officer, already the subject of complaints, was dismissed from his position.

Strong was called to the bar in 1849 and established his practice in Toronto. He quickly established himself in legal circles, being elected a bencher of the Law Society of Upper Canada in 1860 and was designated Queen's Counsel in 1863. In 1858, he was appointed at Osgoode Hall to lecture on the law of equity. From 1856 to 1859 he was commissioner for revising and consolidating the general statutes of Upper Canada. His early legal practice in Toronto included partnerships with Henry Eccles, and Strong later worked in association with several leading lawyers, including Thomas Wardlaw Taylor, James David Edgar, and John Hoskin. He later joined with William Marshall Matheson to form the law firm of Strong and Matheson.

=== Drafting the Supreme Court Act ===
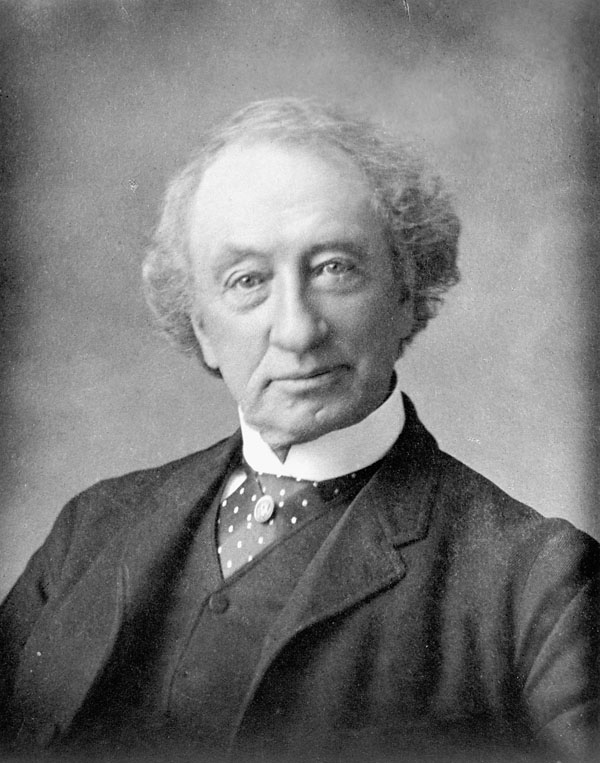
Prime Minister John A. Macdonald enlisted Strong to draft the ultimately unsuccessful bill to create the Supreme Court of Canada.

Following Canadian Confederation in 1867, Strong accepted a legal assignment from his friend and political ally, Prime Minister John A. Macdonald to draft the first legislative proposal for the creation of a national supreme court. The two men corresponded frequently throughout the summer, discussing the proposed court's structure and jurisdiction. Strong initially believed the task would be straightforward, but he soon encountered conceptual and constitutional challenges. Drawing inspiration from the Supreme Court of the United States, Strong borrowed provisions from its founding legislation and even unsuccessfully requested funding from Macdonald to travel to Washington to study the American court system. The challenge of creating the new court was the lack of popular consensus of whether Canadian supreme court could rule on provincial matters, or whether its jurisdiction would be limited to federal law. Section 101 of the Constitution Act, 1867, was too vague to provide guidance on the jurisdiction of the new court. Macdonald, a centralist, rejected the narrow interpretation wanted a supreme court to unite the common law in the provinces of Canada. Ultimately, Strong's draft Supreme Court Act, was submitted to Parliament, received first reading and was withdrawn after objections were raised.

=== On the bench ===
On December 27, 1869, Strong was appointed vice-chancellor of the Ontario Court of Chancery, marking his formal entry into the judiciary. In 1871 was appointed to a provincial commission of inquiry in Ontario to examine the fusion of historically separate courts of common law and equity along with other leading judges such as James Robert Gowan, John Wellington Gwynne and Christopher Salmon Patterson. However, Premier Edward Blake dissolved the inquiry in September 1872. On May 27, 1874, Strong was appointed a justice of the Ontario Court of Error and Appeal, a position he held briefly until his appointment to the newly formed Supreme Court of Canada.

== Justice of the Supreme Court of Canada ==
=== Puisne Justice of the Supreme Court of Canada ===
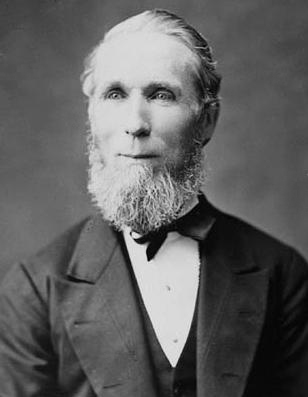
Liberal Prime Minister Alexander Mackenzie appointed Strong to the Court despite Strong's conservative leaning and close friendship with John A. Macdonald.

In April 1875, Parliament passed The Supreme and Exchequer Court Act, (Note: The Supreme and Exchequer Court Act, S.C. 1875, c. 11) which established both the Supreme Court of Canada and the Exchequer Court. The Supreme Court was initially composed of six justices, each of whom also served individually as a judge of the newly created Exchequer Court. On September 30, 1875, Prime Minister Alexander Mackenzie appointed Samuel Henry Strong as one of the court's five puisne justices. He was sworn in alongside the other appointees by Chief Justice William Buell Richards on November 8, 1875. At 50 years old, Strong was the youngest of the newly appointed Supreme Court.

Strong was widely regarded as a leading civil law jurist, praised for his fluency in French, and described as "a scientific lawyer and one of the best appeal judges." At the time, he was reportedly "extremely anxious" to receive the appointment. Strong's association with Macdonald and previous jurisprudence, it was expected that Strong would adopt a centralist interpretation of the British North America Act. However, his subsequent constitutional decisions often defied those expectations, particularly in cases concerning the balance of federal and provincial powers.

In two early constitutional cases, Strong demonstrated a nuanced approach to federalism. In Lenoir v Ritchie (1879), which concerned the authority of provincial lieutenant governors to grant the title of Queen's Counsel, Strong criticized his colleagues for addressing constitutional issues that, in his view, were unnecessary to resolve the case. (Note: Lenoir v Ritchie, 1879 CanLII 37, (1879) 3 SCR 575, Supreme Court (Canada)) Strong's dissent in Mercer v Attorney General for Ontario (1881), siding with Chief Justice Ritchie against the majority's centralist position. The decision was later overturned by the Judicial Committee of the Privy Council, affirming the province's claim. (Note: Mercer v Attorney General for Ontario, 1881 CanLII 6, (1881) 5 SCR 538, Supreme Court (Canada), overturned on appeal Attorney General of Ontario v Mercer [1883] UKPC 42, (1882-83) LR 8 App Cas 767 (on appeal from Canada)) Later, Strong took a firm federalist stance in St. Catharines Milling and Lumber Co. v The Queen (1887), a jurisdictional dispute over timber licenses on Indigenous lands in northern Ontario. Writing in dissent, Strong upheld the Dominion's authority based on treaty surrender and the continued legal force of the Royal Proclamation of 1763. (Note: St Catharines Milling and Lumber Co v R, 1887 CanLII 3, (1887) 13 SCR 577, Supreme Court (Canada), St. Catherines Milling and Lumber Company v The Queen [1888] UKPC 70, (1889) LR 14 App Cas 46 (on appeal from Canada))

In the Court's early years, Strong quickly earned a reputation for his legal intellect, but also for delays in issuing written judgments. Justices often issued oral decisions or brief statements of direction, leading to inconsistencies in reported cases. Strong was frequently criticized by the Registrar for failing to submit his decisions for publication in the Supreme Court Reports. By 1888, the Registrar reported that Strong was responsible for 21 of the 25 outstanding unpublished decisions. In one instance, the Registrar noted in the report that Strong had "mislaid his judgment" and had directed the reporter to publish the case without it. (Note: Milloy v Kerr, 1880 CanLII 5, (1880) 8 SCR 474, Supreme Court (Canada)) The Registrar reportedly visited Strong's home to compel him to complete his work, threatening to omit his opinions from the official reports if the delays continued.

=== Chief Justice of Canada ===
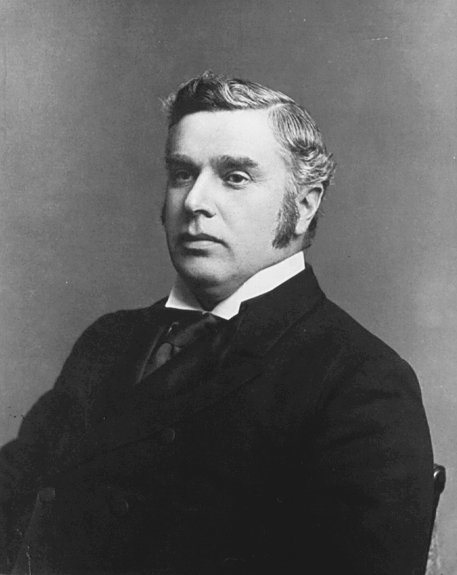
Prime Minister John Thompson appointed Strong as Chief Justice, despite himself being considered for the position only weeks earlier.

On September 25, 1892, Chief Justice William Johnstone Ritchie died at the age of 78 after a relapse of bronchitis. Early speculation suggested that Prime Minister John Abbott might appoint Justice Minister John Sparrow David Thompson as Chief Justice. At the time, there was a widely held view that the position should not automatically go to the Court's longest-serving member. Prominent Conservative Senator James Robert Gowan, a key party advisor on legal matters, strongly opposed an appointment by seniority. Gowan wrote to Justice Minister Thompson suggesting that Justice Strong be allowed to retire and that the appointment be delayed. He also expressed a lack of confidence in Strong's work ethic. Despite these concerns, Thompson, who had recently succeeded John Abbott as Prime Minister, appointed Strong as Chief Justice on December 13, 1892.

Initial public reaction to Strong's appointment was mixed. The Toronto Daily Mail described his elevation as a "foregone conclusion," and the Ottawa Citizen characterized it as "the best appointment that could have been made." However, legal journals expressed more cautious views. The Canadian Law Times questioned the practice of promoting by seniority and the Canada Law Journal reiterated its preference for an external appointment to improve the Court's standing.

Historians Snell and Vaughan described the elevation of Strong to Chief Justice of the Court as a poor selection. While Strong was a highly intelligent justice with an interest in the French civil law and language, his personality was abrasive and his work ethic was poor. Contemporary perception was also negative, with the Canada Law Journal commenting in 1896 that the Supreme Court did not have confidence of the legal profession from either English Canada or Quebec.

As chief justice, Strong was described by his contemporaries as "overshadow[ing] everybody on the bench," and he "dominated without leading." In an 1895 hearing, Strong became incensed with a lawyer arguing a case when he was referred to as "Mr. Strong", and left the hearing, only to return when he was sent for and apologized. In the aftermath of the 1901 case King v Love, a lawyer made a written complaint to the Minister of Justice and the Colonial Secretary about Strong's behaviour. In 1901, a lawyer filed assault charges against Strong for allegedly assaulting the lawyer in the hallway and using violent language in the court room. Strong denied the allegations and the government ignored the issue.

Strong treated Court staff harshly, and was known for harsh criticism of messengers and ushers, often resulting in their dismissal. In the 1898 hearing for Chicoutimi v Price (1898), Strong made a disparaging remark about an employee's competence loud enough to be heard throughout the courtroom. Although he referred to a court officer, many believed the comment targeted a lower court judge in Quebec that had heard the case prior to the Supreme Court. Members of the Quebec bar were incensed by the attack on a French judge by the "arrogant English-speaking" Strong, and demanded his censure and retirement. That same year, Strong dismissed an appeal after providing less than a day's notice for lawyers from Toronto to appear in Ottawa. When the lawyers were unable to reach Ottawa in time, Strong's "stringent application of procedural rules" resulted in dismissal of the appeal and the Court rejecting a motion to rehear the case. The Ontario bar condemned the decision, and prominent lawyer Britton Bath Osler called on Justice Minister David Mills to dismiss both Strong and Gwynne. Mills threatened the Court with legislative action unless they adopted a rule to prevent the circumstances from occurring again.

Strong's health declined during his later years on the Court. He took multiple leaves of absence due to illness or unspecified exhaustion in 1892, 1893, 1897, 1898, 1900, 1901, and 1902, at times missing entire sittings. In his absence, Justice Henri-Elzéar Taschereau assumed many of his administrative duties, though Taschereau later protested the added workload and requested additional compensation. While Strong occasionally had health issues, at other times his doctor reported he needed "rest and change" and provided a vague justification rather than a diagnosis. His physical capabilities deteriorated, causing Strong to fall behind on drafting his decisions. The Department of Justice hired a stenographer to assist Strong, a role that eventually became the permanent secretary to the Chief Justice.

Strong had a close relationship with Minister of Justice and Prime Minister Charles Tupper and the Conservative Party. In 1896, Strong was involved in the restructuring of Tupper's new cabinet by suggesting members, advice to who should represent the province of Ontario in cabinet, and policy on the Manitoba Schools Question.

In addition to his domestic role, Strong represented Canada on the international stage. Strong participated in international arbitration, including a San Salvador and the United States commission in 1902, where his combative demeanor led to a formal complaint from the Salvadoran representative. In 1903, Strong was rejected for the Alaska Boundary Tribunal, with Governor General Lord Minto privately observing that Strong lacked the stature for such a high-profile role.

On November 18, 1902, Strong retired from the Supreme Court following negotiations with Justice Minister Charles Fitzpatrick, who arranged for Strong to receive both a pension and a new salaried position as chair of a federal commission to revise and consolidate Canadian statutes. At the time of his departure, Strong was the last remaining member of the Court's original 1875 bench.

=== Relationship with the other Justices ===
Strong's relationships with his fellow justices were often strained. There is evidence of a animosity between Strong and several justices, including Chief Justice William Johnstone Ritchie, as well as justices John Wellington Gwynne and William Alexander Henry. In 1880 as a puisne justice, he wrote directly to Prime Minister Macdonald to demand the removal of Justice Henry, criticizing Henry's opinions as "long, windy, incoherent, masses of verbiage" that misapplied the law, and describing his conduct as symptomatic of "the incompetency of the Supreme Court." He also expressed private dissatisfaction with other colleagues, including Chief Justice Ritchie. Between 1884 and 1888, Strong offered his resignation to Macdonald on several occasions, citing his disillusionment with the court. Although Macdonald eventually accepted the resignation in 1888, Strong ultimately withdrew his offer and remained on the bench. Additionally, there is considerable correspondence showing Strong held a deep animosity to Justice Gwynne.

There is evidence that Strong had a friendship with justice Désiré Girouard.

=== At the Judicial Committee of the Privy Council ===
In 1895, the Parliament of the United Kingdom amended the constituting documents of the Judicial Committee of the Privy Council to permit the Queen to summon a limited number of justices from the colonies. In 1897, three colonial justices were named to the council, and Chief Justice Strong became the first Canadian justice to sit on the Judicial Committee of the Privy Council. The appointment did not come with pay, so the Canadian government gave Justice Strong a travel allowance of $1,000, which Strong supplemented with his own funds. Chief Justice Strong attended the committee from 1897 to 1900, remained a member until his death in 1909, and sat on 28 reported appeals and wrote eight decisions. Despite no longer attending sessions of the Court, Strong refused to resign, delaying the appointment of newly appointed Chief Justice of Canada Charles Fitzpatrick until 1909. At the time, the Judicial Committee of the Privy Council permitted only two Canadian appointments, and the other position was already held by Henri-Elzéar Taschereau.

Strong heard 28 reported appeals as a member of the Privy Council. Strong authored four decisions for the Judicial Committee of the Privy Council. He upheld the decision of the Supreme Court of Newfoundland in Gaden v The Newfoundland Savings Bank (1899). (Note: Gaden v The Newfoundland Savings Bank [1899] UKPC 2, [1899] AC 281, P.C. (on appeal from Newfoundland)) In The London and Lancashire Life Assurance Company v Jean Fleming (1897), he dismissed the appeal from the Court of Appeal for Ontario. (Note: The London and Lancashire Life Assurance Company v Jean Fleming [1897] UKPC 41, [1897] AC 499, P.C. (on appeal from Canada)) He also dismissed an appeal from the Supreme Court of Canada in The Grand Trunk Railway Company v Washington (1899). (Note: The Grand Trunk Railway Company v Washington [1899] UKPC 3, [1899] AC 275, P.C. (on appeal from Canada)) Finally, in Le Séminaire de Québec v La Corporation de Limoilou (1899), Strong dismissed the appeal from the Quebec Court of Appeal. (Note: Le Séminaire de Québec v La Corporation de Limoilou [1899] UKPC 4, [1899] AC 288, P.C. (on appeal from Canada))

== Personal life ==
Strong's material uncle was naturalist Philip Henry Gosse.

In 1850, Strong married Elizabeth Charlotte Cane, and together they had two daughters. Strong died on August 31, 1909, in Ottawa at the age of 84. He was survived by his wife and two daughters. He was buried in Ottawa's Beechwood Cemetery.

== Legacy ==
Strong had difficulties working with other members of the Supreme Court and counsel that appeared before him. In particular, Strong had a poor relationship with Justice Gwynne. When Justice Minister Charles Tupper sought to remove justices Gwynne and Fournier due to their old age, Strong was described as "going out of his way" to approve and cooperate with Tupper.

In his time as a judge, Snell and Vaughan note that Strong had a poor work ethic, describing him as "lazy". Snell and Vaughan point to Strong's use of issuing an oral decision without a subsequent written version explaining the legal rationale. The lack of explanation or attempt to reconcile the arguments of counsel resulted in poor quality precedent that did not provide guidance to lower court judges or counsel. (Note: Fraser v Drew, 1900 CanLII 82, [1900] 30 SCR 241, Supreme Court (Canada)) (Note: Ontario Mining Company v Seybold, 1901 CanLII 80, [1901] 32 SCR 1, Supreme Court (Canada)) Prime Minister of Canada Robert Borden described Strong as a man of "violent and bullying temperament." R.C.B. Risk described Strong "to have been a bully and unwilling to take seriously any opinions contrary to his own."

Before his appointment to as Chief Justice, Strong offered his resignation to Prime Minister John A. Macdonald several times between 1884 and 1888, and in one instance noted that either justice Gwynne be removed or Strong would retire. Although Macdonald eventually relented and accepted Strong's resignation in 1888, Strong did not follow through with his resignation. Prior to his appointment as Chief Justice, Senator James Robert Gowan wrote to Prime Minister Thompson to dissuade him from the appointment, noting Strong's poor work ethic and earlier attempts to retire from the Court.

Historian Ian Bushnell notes that Chief Justice Strong was a dominant force on the Court, but did not display any leadership, and as a result "the court spiraled downward in the estimation of both the bar and the public". Bushnell also notes that it was possible that Strong was suffering from undiagnosed mental illness beginning in the late 1880s.
