= LexUM =

Lexum is a Canadian legal technology firm, publishing legal information. Lexum is a member of the Free Access to Law Movement.

== Background ==
The firm is a spin-off from the Université de Montréal LexUM Laboratory. The forerunner of Lexum was founded in 1993 as the Law Gopher server at the Université de Montréal. This site was both, respectively, the first available legal resources site in Canada and in French.

The Canadian Legal Information Institute (CanLII) is a not-for-profit organization created by the Federation of Law Societies of Canada in 2001 with Lexum technology backing-up the site ever since. In 2018 CanLII acquired Lexum.

== Services ==
Lexum offers online services designed for producers and managers of legal information, as well as digitization, conversion and publishing services for legislation, case law, secondary material, and other legal materials.
