= Section 20 of the Indian Penal Code =

Section 20 of the Indian Penal Code is about courts of justice. The section states:

The words "Court of Justice" denote a judge who is empowered by law to act judicially alone, or a body of judges, which is empowered by law to act judicially as a body, when such judge or body of judges is acting judicially.
