= St Catharines Milling and Lumber Co v R =

1888 case on Aboriginal title in Canada

- Court: Judicial Committee of the Privy Council
- Full case name: St Catharines Milling and Lumber Company v The Queen
- Decided: 12 December 1888
- Citation: [1888] UKPC 70, 14 App Cas 46

Case history
- Appealed from: St. Catharines Milling and Lumber Co. v. R, 1887 CanLII 3, 13 SCR 577 (20 June 1887), Supreme Court (Canada), affirming a decision of the Court of Appeal for Ontario, which affirmed the judgment of the Chancery Division, restraining the defendants from cutting timber on lands in Ontario claimed to be public lands of the Province.

Court membership
- Judges sitting: Earl of Selborne, Lord Watson, Sir Arthur Hobhouse, Sir Barnes Peacock, Sir Montague E. Smith and Sir Richard Couch

Case opinions
- Decision by: Lord Watson

St Catharines Milling and Lumber Co v R was the leading case on Aboriginal title in Canada for more than 80 years. The Judicial Committee of the Privy Council, affirming a ruling by the Supreme Court of Canada, held that Aboriginal title over land was allowed only at the Crown's pleasure and could be taken away at any time. The case, involving Ojibway Treaty No. 3, which had never been previously litigated before any court, is a leading decision in Canada on the differences between the division of legislative powers and property rights under the Constitution of Canada.

== Background ==
At issue were treaty lands thought to be within Rupert's Land when Canada entered into Treaty 3 in 1873. Following the Ontario-Manitoba Boundary Case, the Canada (Ontario Boundary) Act 1889 placed about two thirds of the treaty area in Ontario. Canada believed that it was entitled under the Treaty and its legislative authority under section 91(24) of the Constitution Act, 1867 for "Indians and Lands reserved for the Indians" to administer Treaty lands. The lumber company was granted a federal permit to a timber berth on Lake Wabigoon, and the permit was challenged by the province.

== Lower courts ==
In 1885, Chancellor Boyd of the Chancery Division held that the phrase "Lands reserved for the Indians" referred only to “Indian Reserves,” and "such words do not cover lands which have never been the subject of treaty or surrender, and as to which the Legislature or executive Government have never specifically appropriated or 'reserved' for the Indian population." On appeal, the Court of Appeal affirmed that and stated that the lands transferred by the 1889 Act, other than those covered by Indian reserves, vested in the Crown in right of Ontario. That was affirmed on appeal to the Supreme Court of Canada.

== Privy Council ==
The Supreme Court ruling was affirmed by the Privy Council. Lord Watson identified the source of Aboriginal title as the Royal Proclamation of 1763, and he noted:

It was suggested in the course of the argument for the Dominion, that inasmuch as the proclamation recites that the territories thereby reserved for Indians had never 'been ceded to or purchased by' the Crown, the entire property of the land remained with them. That inference is, however, at variance with the terms of the [Proclamation], which shew that the tenure of the Indians was a personal and usufructuary right, dependent upon the good will of the Sovereign. The lands reserved are expressly stated to be 'parts of Our dominions and territories;' and it is declared to be the will and pleasure of the sovereign that, 'for the present,' they shall be reserved for the use of the Indians, as their hunting grounds, under his protection and dominion. There was a great deal of learned discussion at the Bar with respect to the precise quality of the Indian right, but their Lordships do not consider it necessary to express any opinion upon the point. It appears to them to be sufficient for the purposes of this case that there has been all along vested in the Crown a substantial and paramount estate, underlying the Indian title, which became a plenum dominium whenever that title was surrendered or otherwise extinguished.

== Impact ==
Other issues arose from the decision. The Privy Council said, for example, that Ontario must relieve Canada of its obligations under the treaty since Ontario had the benefit of it, but subsequent litigation by Canada failed on that point too. In Ontario Mining Co. v. Seybold, the Privy Council extended the rule to deny the Indians any beneficial interest in the reserves that had been set apart for them under the Treaty. It took a series of federal/provincial agreements, culminating in the Canada/Ontario Indian Reserve Lands Agreement, to provide an interim solution to the problems created those decisions. A further resolution was reached in 1986, with the passage of the Indian Lands Agreement (1986) Act.

Even though some of Lord Watson's observations were later varied by the Supreme Court of Canada in Guerin v. The Queen, the case is the starting point for an understanding of Aboriginal law in Canada.
