= William Johnstone Ritchie =

Chief Justice of Canada from 1879 to 1892 (1813–1892)

The Honourable Sir William Johnstone Ritchie
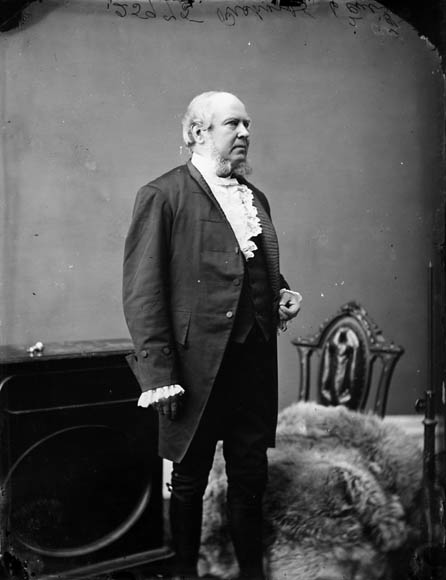

2nd Chief Justice of Canada
- In office January 11, 1879 – September 25, 1892
- Nominated by: Sir John A. Macdonald
- Preceded by: William Buell Richards
- Succeeded by: Samuel Henry Strong

Puisne Justice of the Supreme Court of Canada
- In office September 30, 1875 – January 11, 1879
- Nominated by: Alexander Mackenzie
- Preceded by: new office
- Succeeded by: John Wellington Gwynne

7th Chief Justice of New Brunswick
- In office 1865–1875
- Preceded by: Robert Parker
- Succeeded by: John Campbell Allen

Personal details
- Born: October 28, 1813 Annapolis Royal, Nova Scotia
- Died: September 25, 1892 (aged 78) Ottawa, Ontario
- Resting place: Beechwood Cemetery, Ottawa, Ontario
- Spouses: Martha Strang (m. 1843; died 1847) Grace Vernon Nicholson (m. 1856)
- Education: Pictou Academy

Sir William Johnstone Ritchie (October 28, 1813 – September 25, 1892) was a Canadian judge who was the second Chief Justice of Canada from 1879 to 1892. He was one of the first judges appointed to the Supreme Court of Canada, and the second-longest serving chief justice of the court after Beverley McLachlin.

The Supreme Court under Ritchie continued to face many of the same criticisms as its predecessor, the Richards Court, including the concerns about the conduct of its justices, the excessive length and lack of clarity in its decisions, and significant delays in the publication of those decisions.

== Life and career ==
Ritchie was born on October 28, 1813, in Annapolis Royal, Nova Scotia, to Thomas Ritchie and Elizabeth Wildman Johnstone. He graduated from the Pictou Academy, and went to study law in Halifax in the office of his brother, John William Ritchie, who became a Father of Confederation. He was called to the bar of Nova Scotia in 1837 but moved to Saint John, New Brunswick, and was called to the bar of that province the following year.

In 1846 he was elected to the Legislative Assembly of New Brunswick. In keeping with his pledge to resign if a fellow Liberal candidate failed to win a by-election, he gave up his seat in 1851, only to be re-elected three years later. In 1855 he left politics to accept an appointment to the Supreme Court of New Brunswick, and 10 years later he was named Chief Justice of New Brunswick. In 1869, during the development of one of the early drafts of the Supreme Court Act, Ritchie produced a 24-page document criticizing the draft bill for eroding the jurisdiction of provincial courts. Ritchie also advocated for abolishing the vast majority of appeals to the Privy Council, which would not occur in Canada until 1949. Ritchie also suggested that the original Supreme Court would have the best judges from the provincial courts as the first appointments, a suggestion historian Ian Bushnell suggests would have improved the reputation of the Court in its early years.

== Supreme Court of Canada ==
He was appointed to the newly established Supreme Court of Canada on September 30, 1875, and a month later on November 8 took his oath of office from Chief Justice William Buell Richards along with the four other puisne justices: Samuel Henry Strong, Jean-Thomas Taschereau, Télesphore Fournier, William Alexander Henry. Ritchie was appointed at the age of 62 after 20 years of serving as a Judge. His appointment to the Supreme Court was described by historian Bushnell as perfectly "logical and unimpeachable".

In January 1879, Chief Justice William Buell Richards resigned following pressure from his longtime friend, Prime Minister Macdonald, likely due to his deteriorating health. On January 11, 1879, Ritchie was elevated by Prime Minister John A. Macdonald to Chief Justice of the Supreme Court. Three days later, John Wellington Gwynne was appointed to fill his seat on the Court. Macdonald's decision to appoint Ritchie was seen as a non-partisan decision as the outgoing Liberal government had intended to elevate Ritchie as the senior justice to Chief Justice position.

On November 1, 1881, Richards was knighted on the occasion of Queen Victoria's 62 birthday. The ceremony took place in Quebec City and was presided over Governor General John Campbell, 9th Duke of Argyll.

Ritchie's tenure as Chief Justice has been criticized by historians for failing to bring coherence and unity to the Court. Individual members of the court such as Ritchie's successor as Chief Justice Samuel Henry Strong were described as rude and having a bad temper. Justice Strong was critical of Ritchie, making private comments that he made "absurd rules" in a judgement, and that his priority was the speed of appeals.

As a judge, Ritchie was criticized for his courtroom behaviour, being described by his contemporaries as having a "temper quick and ardent", and being rude and boorish, but still able to keep his temper under control.

At the time, the justices of the court saw a familial relationship with a party sufficient to recuse themselves, but not a familial relationship with a lawyer. In 1891, Ritchie sat to hear a controverted election case his son John Almon Ritchie was one of the counsel for the appellant. Ritchie did not sit in four cases where he was related to parties, including estate matters related to the family of his daughter, his brothers, and one other case.

Ritchie's health began to decline in his last years on the bench, and public opinion of the quality of his decisions in this time declined as well. Ritchie died at his home in Ottawa on September 25, 1892, after a relapse of bronchitis at the age of 78.

== Family life ==
Ritchie was twice married. He was first married to Martha Strang at Rothesay on September 21, 1843. She was the daughter of John Strang, a shipping merchant from St. Andrews. Together they had a son and daughter, and Martha Ritchie died four years later in 1847. Ritchie's second marriage was at Saint John, New Brunswick on May 5, 1856, to Grace Vernon Nicholson (1838–1911). She was the daughter of the late Captain Thomas L. Nicholson and his wife Amy (née Vernon) and stepdaughter of Vice-Admiral William Fitzwilliam Owen, R.N. Seven sons and five daughters were born to this marriage.

Ritchie's funeral was held at St. George's Church, his pallbearers were the five remaining members of the Supreme Court and the Minister of Justice John Sparrow David Thompson. Ritchie is buried at Beechwood Cemetery, Ottawa with his wife.

Ritchie's great-nephew, Roland Ritchie, served as a puisne justice of the Supreme Court.

Legal offices
Preceded by Robert Parker	Chief Justice of New Brunswick; 1865–1875	Succeeded by John C. Allen
