= John Wellington Gwynne =

Canadian judge (1814–1902)

The Honourable John Wellington Gwynne QC
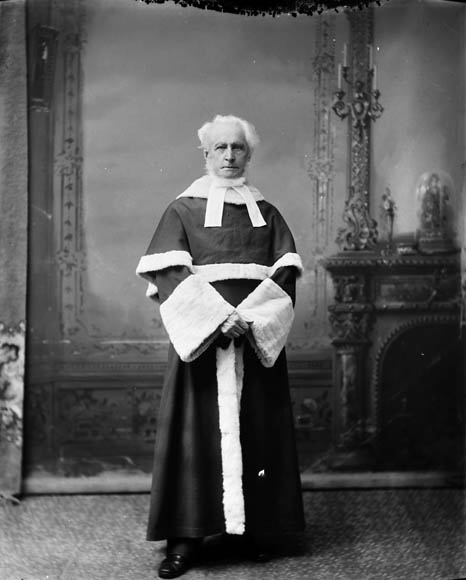
- The Honourable Mr. Justice John Wellington Gwynne

Puisne Justice of the Supreme Court of Canada
- In office January 14, 1879 – January 7, 1902
- Nominated by: John A. Macdonald
- Preceded by: William Johnstone Ritchie
- Succeeded by: David Mills

Personal details
- Born: March 30, 1814 Castleknock, Ireland
- Died: January 7, 1902 (aged 87) Ottawa, Ontario

John Wellington Gwynne, QC (March 30, 1814 – January 7, 1902) was a Canadian lawyer and Puisne Justice of the Supreme Court of Canada.

== Early life ==
John Wellington Gwynne was born on March 30, 1814, in Castleknock, Ireland, to Reverend William Gwynne and Eliza Nelson. He was one of fourteen children, eight of whom lived to adulthood. In July 1828, he enrolled at Trinity College Dublin, but left before earning a degree.

In 1832, Gwynne emigrated to Upper Canada with his older brother, William Charles. That June, he passed the preliminary examination of the Law Society of Upper Canada and began his articles in Kingston with Thomas Kirkpatrick. Two years later, he moved to Toronto to complete his articles under Christopher Alexander Hagerman and William Henry Draper.

== Early business career ==
Gwynne was called to the bar in 1837. His career quickly advanced through both professional and social connections. His brother's marriage to a granddaughter of former Chief Justice William Dummer Powell connected him to the Powell and Jarvis families, where he acted as legal adviser. He handled departmental work for Samuel Jarvis, Chief Superintendent of Indian Affairs, and in 1842 was appointed deputy to John Powell, judge of the Home District, during Powell's illness.

Gwynne was elected a bencher of the Law Society of Upper Canada in 1849 and appointed QC in 1850.

=== Railway career ===
In April 1844, Gwynne traveled to England to study in the chambers of John Rolt, a rising equity lawyer. His time in London coincided with the height of the British railway boom. The following year, he and a colleague organized a company to build a rail line from Toronto to Goderich on Lake Huron, attracting interest from several British investors. Gwynne was appointed counsel and solicitor in Canada for the venture, and remained in England to seek the backing of prominent Upper Canadians, many of whom he had worked with in the short-lived Canada Emigration Association of 1840. When he contacted William Botsford Jarvis, he learned that the City of Toronto and Lake Huron Rail Road Company, which was chartered in 1837 but long dormant, had been revived. The new company proposed working with Gwynne's group, but on terms he deemed unacceptable to British financiers. Gwynne's associates were already in discussions with the Canada Company, which owned the harbour at Goderich and a large stretch of land along the proposed route. The Canada Company's president, Charles Franks, used Gwynne's difficulties with the Toronto group to take over the project. Although Gwynne remained involved, his role diminished when the Toronto group sent Canada Company commissioner Frederick Widder to London to negotiate. The English partners refused to compensate Gwynne for his services or the expenses.

In December 1845, Gwynne returned to Canada and the railway boom had collapsed, leaving the Toronto project without funding. Since the Toronto company had chosen Sarnia rather than Goderich as its terminus, Gwynne launched a new scheme named the Toronto and Goderich Railway Company to reach Goderich, and unsuccessfully proposing that the Upper Canada subsidize the line in exchange for opening Crown lands north of the route. Gwynne planned for immigration from famine-stricken Ireland would supply labour for construction, and the completed railway would facilitate settlement. In April 1847, he helped found the Emigrant Settlement Society to aid the project.

In 1851, the railway company was reorganized as the Toronto and Guelph Railway. A year later, Gwynne and Toronto mayor John George Bowes secured legislative approval to extend the line to Sarnia. Gwynne returned to Britain to seek the Canada Company's support in selling securities, and the railway's absorption into the Grand Trunk Railway in 1853. The Canada Company again took over Gwynne's project, and refused most of his financial claims.

=== Political career ===
In the mid-1840s, Gwynne's brother William Charles had been criticizing Toronto's Tory elite in medical and academic circles, and Gwynne's own disputes with the railway companies reinforced their support for Robert Baldwin's Reform movement. In May 1847, he wrote to his brother expressing agreement with Baldwin's views on responsible government, while opposing the use of clergy reserve funds for general education. Later that year, he ran unsuccessfully for Parliament against cabinet minister William Cayley in Huron. George Brown expressed optimism that Gwynne would be elected both publicly in The Globe and privately. When Reformers considered challenging the results of the election, Gwynne voiced concern over the cost of the challenge and potential loss of income if elected.

== Justice of the Supreme Court of Canada ==
In 1874, he was appointed a puisne judge of the Ontario Court of Appeal. In 1879, he was appointed to the Supreme Court of Canada.

On the Supreme Court, like many members of the legal profession, Gwynne had a poor relationship with the Chief Justice Samuel Henry Strong. Prior to his appointment as Chief Justice, Strong offered his resignation to Prime Minister John A. Macdonald several times between 1884 and 1888, specifically noting his inability to work with Gwynne. As Chief Justice, Strong Strong complained about Gwynne's personality and method of working with other members of the Court, and actively cooperated with Justice Minister Charles Tupper's efforts to have justice's Gwynne and Fournier retire. Justice Gwynne apparently agreed to retire, but continued to stay on the bench after the Conservative government was unable to find a suitable replacement.

Gywnne served on the Supreme Court until his death in 1902.
