= William Alexander Henry =

Canadian Father of Confederation and judge (1816–1888)

The Honourable William Alexander Henry
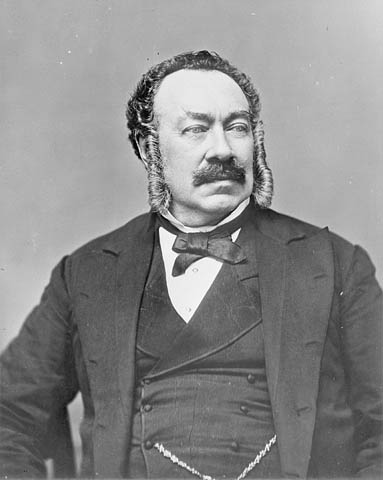

Puisne Justice of the Supreme Court of Canada
- In office September 30, 1875 – May 3, 1888
- Nominated by: Alexander Mackenzie
- Preceded by: None (new position)
- Succeeded by: Christopher Salmon Patterson

Member of the General Assembly of Nova Scotia
- In office 1840–1843
- In office 1847–1867

Mayor of Halifax
- In office 1870–1871
- Preceded by: Stephen Tobin
- Succeeded by: William Dunbar

Personal details
- Born: December 30, 1816 Halifax, Nova Scotia
- Died: May 3, 1888 (aged 71) Ottawa, Ontario
- Children: 8 all together and from each wife 7 from Christianna Mcdonald and 1 from Sophia Mcdonald
- Profession: Lawyer, Judge

William Alexander Henry (December 30, 1816 – May 3, 1888) was a Canadian lawyer, politician, and judge. He was one of the Fathers of Confederation and one of the first justices of the Supreme Court of Canada.

== Early life ==
Henry was born on December 30, 1816, in Halifax, Nova Scotia to Robert Nesbit Henry, an Irish merchant and Margaret Forrestall. The family moved to Antigonish where he was taught by Reverend Thomas Trotter, and he attended Halifax High School. Henry studied law in the late-1830s and was admitted to the Nova Scotia bar in 1840.

In 1841, Henry married Sophia Caroline McDonald who together had one son before she died in 1845. In 1850 Henry married Christianna McDonald and together they had 7 children. His two sons were William Alexander Henry Jr., a successful Halifax lawyer and Hugh McDonald Henry. The elder W. A. Henry served as a cabinet minister in Nova Scotia in governments led by both the Liberals and the Conservatives.

== Political life ==
In 1840, Henry was elected to the General Assembly of Nova Scotia to be the representative for Antigonish.

In 1864, he was appointed attorney general.

Henry was a strong believer in the benefits that could be derived from a British American union such as free trade and the construction of the Intercontinental Railway. Henry was a delegate to all three Confederation Conferences, and upon approval by the union in the Spring of 1866, he travelled to the London Conference as part of the delegation mandated to compose the legislation. The Nova Scotia delegates voted to accept the Quebec Resolutions into the British North America Act, 1867 but Henry objected to the limitation on the number of Senate seats. He also supported the unsuccessful efforts to have the existence of Roman Catholic separate schools entrenched in the Act. He was one of the attorneys general who helped frame the language. However, it is an unproved tradition that he drafted the BNA Act.

After Confederation, Henry suffered defeat in his own district for the first time in 24 years. He returned to private practice in Halifax and was elected mayor of the city in 1870.

== Supreme Court ==
Although he was denied a judgeship in Nova Scotia, Henry was one of the first appointed to the newly created Supreme Court of Canada in 1875.

During his time on the Supreme Court, Henry authored minority decisions to reform the rule of Crown immunity, attempting to hold the federal government liable in civil actions brought by people that had experienced loss. (Note: The Queen v McFarlane, 1882 CanLII 32, 7 SCR 216, Supreme Court (Canada)) (Note: The Queen v McLeod, 1883 CanLII 49, 8 SCR 1, Supreme Court (Canada)) Historian Ian Bushnell described Henry as the most controversial member of the Supreme Court in its early years, he was viewed as an "innovate" justice "in an unruly way".

Henry died in Ottawa, Ontario on May 3, 1888.

== Personal life ==
Henry was a Freemason of St. John's Lodge, No. 161 (England) in Halifax, and affiliated with Civil Service Lodge No. 148 (Ontario) of Ottawa on March 13, 1883.

Henry House in Halifax, which served as Henry's residence from 1854 to 1864, was designated a National Historic Site in 1969 due in part to its association with Henry.

== Election results ==
1867 Canadian federal election: Antigonish
Party	Candidate	Votes	%
Anti-Confederation	Hugh McDonald	1,238	76.04
Conservative	William Alexander Henry	390	23.96
Total valid votes		1,628	–
This electoral district was created by the British North America Act, 1867 from the colonial Province of Nova Scotia's Antigonish electoral district. William Alexander Henry was one of the incumbents, along with John McKinnon.
Source: Library of Parliament
