= List of justices of the Supreme Court of Canada by court composition =

The Supreme Court of Canada (French: Cour suprême du Canada), the highest court of Canada, and the final court of appeals in the Canadian justice system, is composed of nine justices—a chief justice and eight puisne judges—appointed by the Governor General-in-Council. Altogether, 88 persons have served on the Court since it was created in 1875; during this time there have been 18 chief justices.

The graphical timeline below lists the justices of the Supreme Court of Canada by court composition. As Supreme Court historians categorize eras in the court's history by the name of the presiding chief justice, the timeline is divided into sections, according to who was chief justice at the time. The incumbent puisne justices at the start of each court era are listed in order of their seniority at that time. Justices joining the Court during an era are listed below them in the order of their appointment. The bars are colour-coded to show the changes in seniority among the justices during each era.

== List of justices ==
=== Richards Court ===
The Richards Court era, under the leadership of William Buell Richards, lasted from September 30, 1875 to January 10, 1879.

Seniority colour key:
Chief justice 1st puisne justice 2nd puisne justice 3rd puisne justice 4th puisne justice 5th puisne justice

=== Ritchie Court ===
The Ritchie Court era, under the leadership of William Johnstone Ritchie, lasted from January 11, 1879 to September 25, 1892. Ritchie had been a puisne Supreme Court justice for 3 years, 103 days at the time of his elevation to chief justice.

Seniority colour key:
Chief justice 1st puisne justice 2nd puisne justice 3rd puisne justice 4th puisne justice 5th puisne justice

=== Strong Court ===
The Strong Court era, under the leadership of Samuel Henry Strong, lasted from December 13, 1892 – November 18, 1902. Strong had been a puisne Supreme Court justice for 17 years, 74 days at the time of his elevation to chief justice.

Seniority colour key:
Chief justice 1st puisne justice 2nd puisne justice 3rd puisne justice 4th puisne justice 5th puisne justice

=== H.-E. Taschereau Court ===
The H.-E. Taschereau Court era, under the leadership of Henri-Elzéar Taschereau, lasted from November 21, 1902 to May 2, 1906. Taschereau had been a puisne Supreme Court justice for 24 years, 45 days at the time of his elevation to chief justice.

Seniority colour key:
Chief justice 1st puisne justice 2nd puisne justice 3rd puisne justice 4th puisne justice 5th puisne justice

=== Fitzpatrick Court ===
The Fitzpatrick Court era, under the leadership of Charles Fitzpatrick, lasted from June 4, 1906 to October 21, 1918. He is the only chief justice to date, other than the Court's inaugural chief justice, Sir William Buell Richards, to have served in that position without having first been a puisne Justice on the court.

Seniority colour key:
Chief justice 1st puisne justice 2nd puisne justice 3rd puisne justice 4th puisne justice 5th puisne justice

=== Davies Court ===
The Davies Court era, under the leadership of Louis Henry Davies, lasted from October 23, 1918 to May 1, 1924. Davies had been a puisne Supreme Court justice for 17 years, 59 days at the time of his elevation to chief justice.

Seniority colour key:
Chief justice 1st puisne justice 2nd puisne justice 3rd puisne justice 4th puisne justice 5th puisne justice

=== Anglin Court ===
The Anglin Court era, under the leadership of Francis Alexander Anglin, lasted from September 16, 1924 to February 28, 1933. Anglin had been a puisne Supreme Court justice for 15 years, 206 days at the time of his elevation to chief justice. A sixth puisne justice position was created in 1927, bringing the Court to a total of seven justices.

Note: + denotes new Supreme Court seat

Seniority colour key:
Chief justice 1st puisne justice 2nd puisne justice 3rd puisne justice 4th puisne justice 5th puisne justice 6th puisne justice

=== Duff Court ===
The Duff Court era, under the leadership of Lyman Duff, lasted from March 17, 1933 to January 6, 1944. Duff had been a puisne Supreme Court justice for 26 years, 171 days at the time of his elevation to chief justice.

Seniority colour key:
Chief justice 1st puisne justice 2nd puisne justice 3rd puisne justice 4th puisne justice 5th puisne justice 6th puisne justice

=== Rinfret Court ===
The Rinfret Court era, under the leadership of Thibaudeau Rinfret, lasted from January 8, 1944 to June 22, 1954. Rinfret had been a puisne Supreme Court justice for 19 years, 99 days at the time of his elevation to chief justice. Two additional puisne justice seats were created in 1949, bringing the Court to its current composition of nine justices.

Note: + denotes new Supreme Court seat

Seniority colour key:
Chief justice 1st puisne justice 2nd puisne justice 3rd puisne justice 4th puisne justice 5th puisne justice 6th puisne justice 7th puisne justice 8th puisne justice

=== Kerwin Court ===
The Kerwin Court era, under the leadership of Patrick Kerwin, lasted from July 1, 1954 to February 2, 1963. Kerwin had been a puisne Supreme Court justice for 18 years, 346 days at the time of his elevation to chief justice.

Seniority colour key:
Chief justice 1st puisne justice 2nd puisne justice 3rd puisne justice 4th puisne justice 5th puisne justice 6th puisne justice 7th puisne justice 8th puisne justice

=== R. Taschereau Court ===
The R. Taschereau Court era, under the leadership of Robert Taschereau, lasted from April 22, 1963 to September 1, 1967. Taschereau had been a puisne Supreme Court justice for 23 years, 72 days at the time of his elevation to chief justice.

Seniority colour key:
Chief justice 1st puisne justice 2nd puisne justice 3rd puisne justice 4th puisne justice 5th puisne justice 6th puisne justice 7th puisne justice 8th puisne justice

=== Cartwright Court ===
The Cartwright Court era, under the leadership of John Robert Cartwright, lasted from September 1, 1967 to March 23, 1970. Cartwright had been a puisne Supreme Court justice for 17 years, 253 days at the time of his elevation to chief justice.

Seniority colour key:
Chief justice 1st puisne justice 2nd puisne justice 3rd puisne justice 4th puisne justice 5th puisne justice 6th puisne justice 7th puisne justice 8th puisne justice

=== Fauteux Court ===
The Fauteux Court era, under the leadership of Gérald Fauteux, lasted from March 23, 1970 to December 23, 1973. Fauteux had been a puisne Supreme Court justice for 20 years, 91 days at the time of his elevation to chief justice.

Seniority colour key:
Chief justice 1st puisne justice 2nd puisne justice 3rd puisne justice 4th puisne justice 5th puisne justice 6th puisne justice 7th puisne justice 8th puisne justice

=== Laskin Court ===
The Laskin Court era, under the leadership of Bora Laskin, lasted from December 27, 1973 to March 26, 1984. Laskin had been a puisne Supreme Court justice for 3 years, 279 days at the time of his elevation to chief justice.

Seniority colour key:
Chief justice 1st puisne justice 2nd puisne justice 3rd puisne justice 4th puisne justice 5th puisne justice 6th puisne justice 7th puisne justice 8th puisne justice

=== Dickson Court ===
The Dickson Court era, under the leadership of Brian Dickson, lasted from April 18, 1984 to June 30, 1990. Dickson had been a puisne Supreme Court justice for 11 years, 23 days at the time of his elevation to chief justice.

Seniority colour key:
Chief justice 1st puisne justice 2nd puisne justice 3rd puisne justice 4th puisne justice 5th puisne justice 6th puisne justice 7th puisne justice 8th puisne justice

=== Lamer Court ===
The Lamer Court era, under the leadership of Antonio Lamer, lasted from July 1, 1990 to January 6, 2000. Lamer had been a puisne Supreme Court justice for 10 years, 95 days at the time of his elevation to chief justice.

Seniority colour key:
Chief justice 1st puisne justice 2nd puisne justice 3rd puisne justice 4th puisne justice 5th puisne justice 6th puisne justice 7th puisne justice 8th puisne justice

=== McLachlin Court ===
The McLachlin Court era, under the leadership of Beverley McLachlin, lasted from January 7, 2000 to December 15, 2017. McLachlin had been a puisne Supreme Court justice for 10 years, 283 days at the time of her elevation to chief justice. She is both the first woman to hold that position and the longest serving chief justice in Canadian history.

Seniority colour key:
Chief justice 1st puisne justice 2nd puisne justice 3rd puisne justice 4th puisne justice 5th puisne justice 6th puisne justice 7th puisne justice 8th puisne justice

=== Wagner Court ===
The Wagner Court era, under the leadership of Richard Wagner, began December 18, 2017 and is ongoing. Wagner had been a puisne Supreme Court justice for 5 years, 74 days at the time of his elevation to chief justice.

Note: The bronze vertical line denotes "now" (July 2026).

Seniority colour key:
Chief justice 1st puisne justice 2nd puisne justice 3rd puisne justice 4th puisne justice 5th puisne justice 6th puisne justice 7th puisne justice 8th puisne justice

== Sources ==
- "Current and Former Chief Justices". Ottawa, Ontario: Supreme Court of Canada.
- "Current and Former Judges". Ottawa, Ontario: Supreme Court of Canada.
