= Davies Court =

Period of the Supreme Court of Canada from 1918 to 1924

Supreme Court of Canada
Davies Court
- Fitzpatrick Court ← → Anglin Court
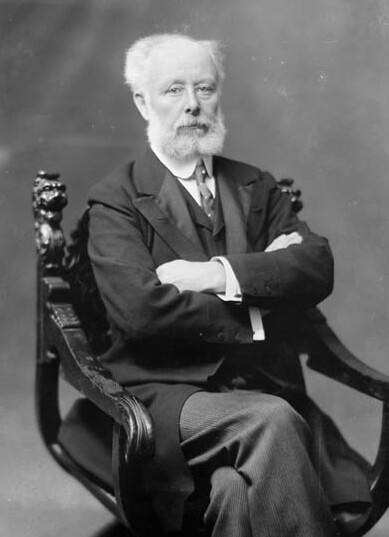
- Louis Henry Davies
- October 23, 1918 – May 1, 1924 (5 years, 191 days)
- Seat: Second Supreme Court of Canada building
- No. of positions: 6

The Davies Court was the period in the history of the Supreme Court of Canada from 1918 to 1924, during which Louis Henry Davies served as Chief Justice of Canada. Davies succeeded Charles Fitzpatrick as Chief Justice after the latter's resignation, and held the position until his death on May 1, 1924.

The Davies Court, much like all iterations of the Supreme Court prior to 1949, was largely overshadowed by the Judicial Committee of the Privy Council, which served as the highest court of appeal in Canada, and whose decisions on Canadian appeals were binding on all Canadian courts.

The Davies Court continued to face many of the same criticisms as its predecessors, the Ritchie Court, Strong Court, Taschereau Court, and Fitzpatrick Court including the concerns about the quality and partisan nature of the appointments, and the growing political role of the justices.

== Membership ==
The Supreme Court Act, 1875 established the Supreme Court of Canada, composed of six justices, two of whom were allocated to Quebec under law, in recognition of the province's unique civil law system. (Note: The Supreme and Exchequer Court Act, S.C. 1875, c. 11 (The Supreme and Exchequer Court Act at Canadiana)) Early appointments to the Court reflected an unwritten regional balance, with two justices from Ontario and two from the Maritimes. Western Canada was not represented until the early 1900s.

On October 21, 1918, Chief Justice Charles Fitzpatrick unexpectedly resigned at age 66, citing declining health. Historians Snell and Vaughan note, that he had lost interest in judicial work and was more focused on political issues, including the alienation of French Canadians after the Conscription Crisis. Before resigning, Fitzpatrick wrote to Prime Minister Robert Borden and Justice Minister Charles Doherty requesting appointment as Lieutenant Governor of Quebec, which was granted on October 23, 1918.

On October 23, 1918, Prime Minister Borden appointed Louis Henry Davies as the sixth Chief Justice of Canada. Davies, the senior puisne justice with 17 years on the bench, was in poor health at age 73. Two months earlier, he had sent Borden two telegrams expressing interest in the position, citing his credentials, and promising to resign in three years after reaching 20 years of service. Cabinet approved his appointment by a narrow majority. Although it was publicly expected that Lyman Duff or Francis Alexander Anglin would be chosen, Snell and Vaughan note there is little evidence that the government seriously considered other candidates. They describe Davies as a weak choice for Chief Justice, as he was elderly, had not distinguished himself on the Court, and lacked demonstrated leadership ability.

Justices from the Fitzpatrick Court who continued into the Davies Court included John Idington of Ontario, Lyman Duff of British Columbia, Francis Alexander Anglin of Ontario, and Louis-Philippe Brodeur of Quebec.

On October 25, 1918, Borden appointed Pierre-Basile Mignault of Quebec to fill the vacancy created by Fitzpatrick's resignation. Mignault, then 64, was a civil law scholar and professor at McGill University, best known for his nine-volume Droit civil canadien (1885–1916). Snell and Vaughan describe his appointment as strong, bringing scholarly depth and 40 years of legal practice. Others considered included Justice Minister Charles Doherty, Eugène Lafleur, and Louis-Philippe Pelletier.

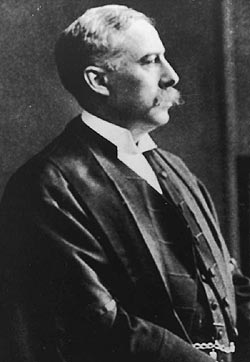
Appointed by Prime Minister Mackenzie King, Albert Malouin did not want a position on the Supreme Court, and would resign in less than a year.

On January 30, 1924, Prime Minister William Lyon Mackenzie King appointed Albert Malouin of Quebec to replace Justice Brodeur, who had resigned on October 9, 1923. Malouin, 66, was a Quebec Superior Court judge. Snell and Vaughan call his appointment "the least thoughtful in the history of the [Court]." Malouin had not sought the position, was not informed until after the decision, and made clear to his colleagues that he had no interest in serving. He suffered from severe diabetes which he had nearly died from and was in poor health. His appointment was recommended by Ernest Lapointe, overruling Justice Minister Lomer Gouin's preferred candidates, Thibaudeau Rinfret and Louis St. Laurent. Conservative Ferdinand Roy was also considered. Snell and Vaughan suggest Malouin's appointment reflected political infighting between Lapointe and Gouin. Malouin resigned on September 30, 1924, after less than a year on the Court, the second shortest tenure in its history, and the shortest to conclude other than by death.

Justice Brodeur had resigned at age 61 due to poor health and arthritis that impaired his ability to write. Mackenzie King, who described Brodeur as "like a brother or a father," arranged for his appointment as Lieutenant Governor of Quebec, succeeding Fitzpatrick.

On May 1, 1924, Chief Justice Louis Henry Davies died at age 78. He had planned to retire in 1921 but stayed on due to a dispute over the value of his pension. By late 1923, his health had declined to the point that he could no longer perform his duties. Prime Minister Mackenzie King privately accused him of remaining in office too long. On September 16, 1924, Francis Alexander Anglin was appointed as the seventh Chief Justice of Canada.

=== Timeline ===
Bar key:
Laurier appointee Borden appointee King appointee

== Other branches of government ==
The Fitzpatrick Court began during the 13th Canadian Parliament, under a majority government led by Unionist Prime Minister Robert Borden.

Borden resigned as Prime Minister due to poor health on July 10, 1920, and was replaced by Arthur Meighen. In the 1921 Federal election, the Liberal Party led by William Lyon Mackenzie King was elected to a majority government.

== Relationship with the Judicial Committee of the Privy Council ==
From 1867 to 1949, the Judicial Committee of the Privy Council served as the highest court of appeal in Canada, and its decisions on Canadian appeals were binding on all Canadian courts. After the creation of the Supreme Court of Canada, parties could still—if both consented—appeal directly from a provincial court of appeal to the Judicial Committee, bypassing the Supreme Court. This became common practice. By 1900, the Privy Council had become dominant in Canadian jurisprudence, often deciding cases with "little or no restraint or respect" for the decisions of the Canadian courts from which the appeals originated. By the early 20th century, it was regarded as a normal part of the Canadian legal system, no longer limited to exceptional cases, a point the Committee itself stressed when urging Canadian lawyers to bring forward only cases of significance or importance.

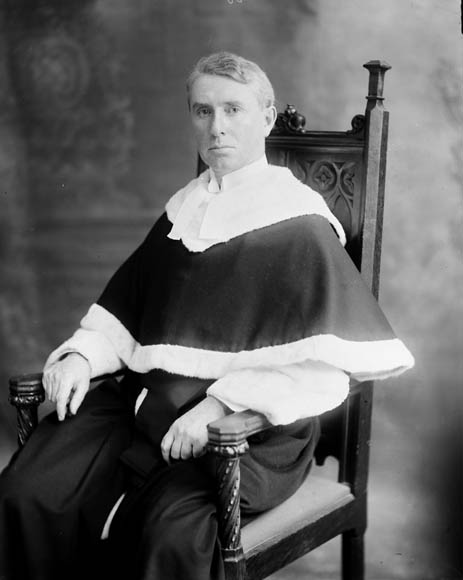
Lyman Duff became the first Puisne Justice to be appointed to the Judicial Committee of the Privy Council.

In 1895, the Parliament of the United Kingdom amended the Judicial Committee's constituting documents to allow the Queen to summon a limited number of colonial justices. In 1909, Chief Justice Charles Fitzpatrick was appointed to the Imperial Privy Council. In January 1918, Lyman Duff became the first pusine justice to be appointed to the Privy Council.

The appeal to the Privy Council was criticized in English Canada following the growth of anti-imperialist sentiment after the First World War. United Farmers of Ontario Attorney General William Edgar Raney proposed to abolish all appeals from Ontario to the Privy Council, based on the principle of self-government. The Canadian Law Journal and the Law Society of Upper Canada supported the Privy Council and criticized these proposals. At the same time, Quebec Premier Louis-Alexandre Taschereau noted that his province wanted to maintain the appeal. Lord Chancellor Birkenhead made the position of the British government was that the continued existence of an appeal was up to Canada.

- Board of Commerce case (1921): on the scope of Parliament's authority under the federal power of peace, order and good government. The Supreme Court of Canada split 3–3. Viscount Haldane held that Parliament could not intrude on the provinces' "quasi-sovereign authority" over matters relating to property and civil rights, unless there were "highly exceptional circumstances," such as war or famine. The legislation at issue, which regulated fair prices in trade and commerce, was ruled ultra vires because the subject matter did not meet the emergency standard required to justify federal intervention. (Note: The Attorney General of Canada (Appeal No. 103 of 1920) v The Attorney General of Alberta and others [1921] UKPC 107, [1922] 1 AC 191 (on appeal from Canada))
- Fort Frances Pulp and Paper v Manitoba Free Press (1923): on the scope of Parliament's authority under the federal power of peace, order and good government. The War Measures Act permitted Parliament to implement a price control regime, which was continued after the war. Viscount Haldane held that the emergency powers of peace, order and good government permitted Parliament to temporarily pass laws during great emergencies that would normally be under provincial jurisdiction, and that Parliament may determine when the emergency has ended, and the judiciary needs clear evidence to justify overruling Parliament on the end of an emergency. (Note: The Fort Frances Pulp and Paper Company Limited (Appeal No. 69 of 1923) v The Manitoba Free Press Company Limited and others (Ontario) [1923] UKPC 64, [1923] AC 695 (on appeal from Canada))

== Rulings of the Court ==
Below is a selection of rulings of the Davies Court.

- Raymond v Township of Bosanquet (1919): on the duty of care for municipalities and credibility of witnesses. A unanimous Court dismissed an appeal, noting that credibility involves an assessment of the trustworthiness of a witness' testimony based upon the veracity or sincerity of a witness and the accuracy of the evidence that the witness provides. (Note: Raymond v Township of Bosanquet, 1919 CanLII 11, (1919) 59 SCR 452, Supreme Court (Canada))
- Desrosiers v The King (1920): on doctrines of English common law in civil law cases. In a 3–1 decision, Anglin, Brodeur, and Mignault held that English decisions should not be cited as authorities in cases from the Province of Quebec which do not depend upon doctrines derived from English law. (Note: Desrosiers v The King, 1920 CanLII 77, (1920) 60 SCR 105, Supreme Court (Canada))
- Curley v Latreille (1920): on agency in contract under Quebec's civil law. Desrosiers sold hay to McDonnell unaware he was an agent for the dominion government, when McDonnell did not pay, Desrosiers got a court order against McDonnell. Desrosiers then brought an action against the Dominion government as the principal. In a 4–1 decision, the Supreme Court permitted the action against the principal, with justices Anglin, Brodeur, and Mignault rejecting the English common law rule, and applying the language of the Quebec Civil Code. (Note: Curley v Latreille, 1920 CanLII 55, (1920) 60 SCR 131, Supreme Court (Canada))
- Canada Paper Company v Brown (1922): on nuisance. The unanimous Court issued a permanent injunction preventing a sulphite plant from emitting odors and fumes as it interfered with one individual's ability to enjoy their summer home. Justice Duff noted that in every case the Court would compare the common good of the community with individual claims, and if there was sufficient harm to the common good, an injunction would not be granted. (Note: Canada Paper Co. v Brown, 1922 CanLII 38, (1922) 63 SCR 243, Supreme Court (Canada))
- Bedard v Dawson (1923): on federalism and provincial authority to pass laws for the suppression of crime. A unanimous Court held that that Quebec legislation authorizing a judge to order the closing of a disorderly house was valid, and distinct from the federal criminal law powers. (Note: Bedard v Dawson, 1923 CanLII 43, (1923) SCR 681, Supreme Court (Canada))

== Administration of the Court ==
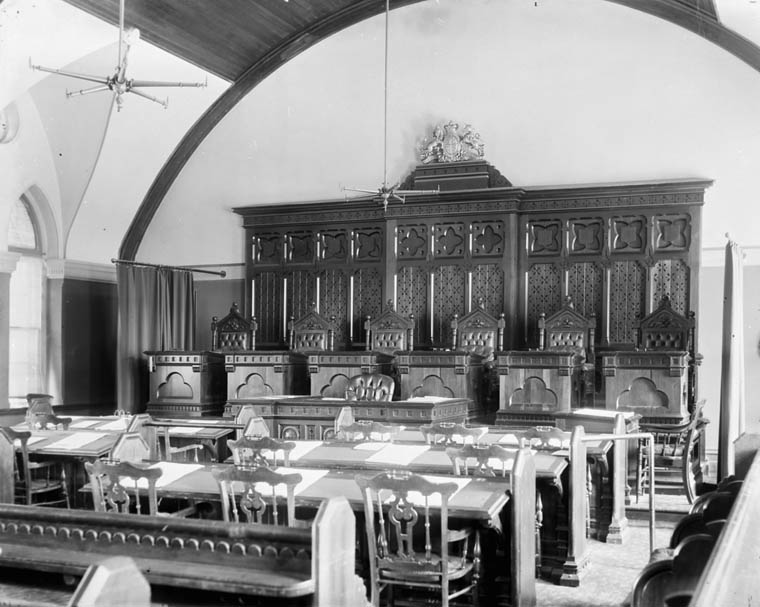
Interior of the Second Supreme Court of Canada Building showing the desks of the six justices of the Court.

The Court operated with a panel of six judges, with a quorum of four judges, meaning that if there was an equal division (3—3), the appeal would be dismissed. In its early years, the Court did not sit at a traditional shared bench. Instead, each of the six justices had individual desks. Historians Snell and Vaughan note that this setup coincided with a period in the 1880s marked by deep divisions within the Court and a lack of "consultation and cooperation" among the justices. It was also common for each justice to write their own individual reasons for judgement rather than issuing joint judgments. This practice, prevalent in the 1880s, continued into the 20th century. Combined with the frequent dismissal of appeals due to tied votes, made it difficult to establish clear legal precedents or to discern whether a coordinated judicial approach existed. As a result, the Court primarily resolved disputes by applying existing legal principles, rather than by setting new legal standards. Under the Supreme Court Act, the Court held three sessions per year.

There is little evidence on how the justices interacted after hearing a case. Snell and Vaughan note that during the Davies Court there appears to be evidence of some exchanges of draft judgements and judicial conferences. However, as Chief Justice, Davies did not place much emphasis on coordinating judicial reasoning, or improving the intellectual quality of the Court's reasons.

In its final year, the Davies Court struggled to maintain quorum. Justice Idington, then 83, no longer had the mind capable of functioning at the same capacity. Justice Malouin fell ill and resigned soon after the appointment of the new Chief Justice. Chief Justice Davies himself, despite promising to retire after three years, remained in office until his death in May 1924.

The Court recognized the right of applicants from Quebec to use either English or French. While French-language materials were accepted, they were translated into English at the Court's expense. The Supreme Court Act required the Court to publish its own decisions rather than relying on private law reporters. Judgments published in the Supreme Court Reports were printed in the language in which they were delivered and were not translated.

=== Changes to the structure and jurisdiction of the Court ===
Several attempts in the 1890s and 1900s to permit federal or provincial court justices to sit as ad hoc members of the Court failed. In 1910, Justice Anglin submitted a draft bill to the government to permit ad hoc members without notifying other justices, which was ignored by the government. In 1918, after the Court was forced to suspend a sitting due to unavailability of its members, the government passed a bill permitting the Chief Justice to appoint an ad hoc judge from the Exchequer Court or a provincial chief justice. In practice, the Court appointed ad hoc justices based on proximity, bringing the Chief Justice of the King's Bench of Ontario William Glenholme Falconbridge when Duff of British Columbia, or Fitzpatrick of Quebec were absent. (Note: In the Matter of the Port Arthur Wagon Co, 1918 CanLII 9, (1918) 57 SCR 388, Supreme Court (Canada))

In 1920, Parliament amended the Supreme Court Act to standardize the minimum financial value of as a right appeals in civil matters to be $2,000 (equivalent to $28,807 in 2025) for all jurisdictions in Canada. (Note: An Act to Amend the Supreme Court Act, S.C. 1920, c. 32) Snell and Vaughan note that many of the justices of the Court were involved in the changes to the Court's administration.

=== Growing political role of the Court ===
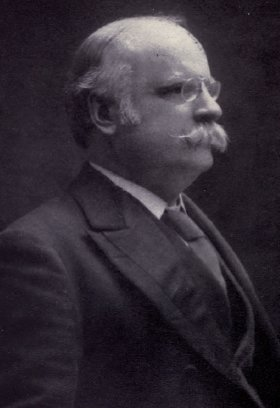
Minister of Justice Charles Doherty sought the opinions of two justices on a matter while it was before the Supreme Court.

Snell and Vaughan note that in the early decades of the Court, close connections and political involvement between the justices and the government were both common and encouraged, and were not regarded as inappropriate. By 1920, the idea that the Supreme Court could serve as a useful political instrument was well entrenched. Political interference was evident during an appeal on the validity of the Canada Temperance Act. During the proceedings, Justice Duff recorded that Minister of Justice Charles Doherty summoned Justices Anglin and Mignault to ascertain the likely views of the Court and the probable outcome should the government introduce an amendment while the appeal was pending.

With some exceptions, Laurier's appointments to the Court were highly partisan. In the early twentieth century, the justices themselves became increasingly entangled in national politics, both through appointments to government bodies and through the growing use of reference questions. As these references became more overtly political, they exposed the Court to sustained criticism from the Conservative opposition. In 1922, Parliament expanded the Court's jurisdiction to include appeals from provincial reference questions. (Note: An Act to Amend the Supreme Court Act, S.C. 1922, c. 48) Prime Minister Mackenzie King quickly made strategic use of the reference procedure to deflect the political consequences of divisive federalism disputes. The newly passed Board of Commerce Act authorized the board to refer questions of law to the Supreme Court. (Note: The Board of Commerce Act, S.C. 1919, c. 37, s. 32)

There were several other instances in which the justices performed overtly political roles. In 1923, for example, Justice Duff provided legislative advice to Ontario Attorney General William Raney. Snell and Vaughan identify additional occasions of this kind, observing that in each case the justices readily cooperated with the politicians who sought their counsel.

=== Expansion of duties of justices ===
In the late 1890s, Supreme Court justices increasingly accepted additional roles at the government's request, reflecting both the Court's growing stature and its deeper involvement in public affairs beyond the bench. These political and quasi-judicial roles reflected a gradual increase in respect for the Court, but also reinforced the view that it was a political tool rather than an institution separate from government.

In 1919, Robert Borden organized a royal commission into a military police raid on a Jesuit seminary in Guelph, and attempted to name Davies and Anglin to the commission. Both justices declined the appointment, with Davies noting it would be "undesirable the Chief Justice of Canada should be mixed up with [such a political and religious controversy]."

In 1923, Justice Anglin was selected as Canada's nominee to the International Court of Justice in The Hague, however, he was not selected for the role.

== Legal philosophy of the Court ==
Between 1906 and 1944, the Supreme Court heard over 200 constitutional cases. Considering federalism and the distribution of powers, justices such as Lyman Duff sought to limit the scope of the federal Peace, Order, and Good Government authority to prevent intrusions into provincial matters.

== Appraisal ==
Historian Ian Bushnell describes the Supreme Court from 1903 to 1929, covering the Taschereau, Fitzpatrick, Davies, and Anglin Courts, as "the sterile years." During this period, disunity in decision-making reached new heights, making it difficult to discern overarching legal principles. As a result, the Court's jurisprudence was of limited value. This made retaining appeals to the Privy Council attractive, since a single decision from London provided greater certainty in the law.

Criticism focused on the politically motivated nature of many judicial appointments. While some legal journals occasionally defended the Court against press criticism, Bushnell notes these defences were motivated more by a desire to uphold the credibility of the legal system as a whole, than to support the Court itself. Prime Minister Wilfrid Laurier appointed 10 justices and had the opportunity to shape the Court, but, there was no consistent approach to appointments during the era. Appointments were a mix of merit, patronage, and government interests, rather than what was best for the long-term development of the Court. Prime Minister Mackenzie King's appointment of Albert Malouin who was not in physical condition to sit on the Court, nor did not want the appointment demonstrated the minimal care put into appointments at the time. The political nature of appointments, combined with the Court's use as a political tool, contributed to institutional decline during the Fitzpatrick and Davies era.

In its written decisions, the Court's reasoning during this period was largely formulaic and conservative, likely because it continued to view itself as an intermediate appellate body to the Privy Council. As a result, the Court made little contribution to developing the law, and issuing decisions that drew ridicule from the public and legal community.

== See also ==
- Supreme Court of Canada cases
