= Anglin Court =

Period of the Supreme Court of Canada from 1924 to 1933

Supreme Court of Canada
Anglin Court
- Davies Court ← → Duff Court
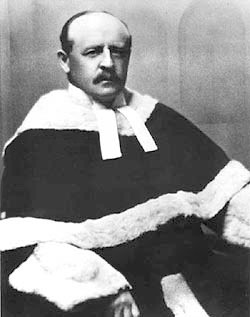
- Francis Alexander Anglin
- September 16, 1924 – February 28, 1933 (8 years, 165 days)
- Seat: Second Supreme Court of Canada building
- No. of positions: 6 (1924–1927); 7 (1927–1933)

The Anglin Court was the period in the history of the Supreme Court of Canada from 1924 to 1933, during which Francis Alexander Anglin served as Chief Justice of Canada. Anglin succeeded Louis Henry Davies as Chief Justice following Davies' death, and held the position until his resignation on February 28, 1933.

The Anglin Court, much like all iterations of the Supreme Court prior to 1949, was largely overshadowed by the Judicial Committee of the Privy Council, which served as the highest court of appeal in Canada, and whose decisions on Canadian appeals were binding on all Canadian courts. The Anglin Court's decisions were overturned in several high-profile cases, including the Persons case, and the Aeronautics Reference.

The Anglin Court continued to face many of the same criticisms as its predecessors, the Ritchie Court, Strong Court, Taschereau Court, Fitzpatrick Court, and Davies Court, including the concerns about the quality and partisan nature of the appointments, and the growing political role of the justices.

== Membership ==
The Supreme Court Act, 1875 established the Supreme Court of Canada, composed of six justices, two of whom were allocated to Quebec under law, in recognition of the province's unique civil law system. (Note: The Supreme and Exchequer Court Act, S.C. 1875, c. 11 (The Supreme and Exchequer Court Act at Canadiana)) Early appointments to the Court reflected an unwritten regional balance, with two justices from Ontario and two from the Maritimes. The western provinces were not represented until the early twentieth century.

=== Appointment of Chief Justice Anglin ===
Chief Justice Louis Henry Davies died on May 1, 1924, at the age of 78. Although he had planned to retire in 1921, a dispute over his pension's value delayed his departure. On September 16, 1924, Francis Alexander Anglin was appointed as the seventh Chief Justice of Canada. Prime Minister William Lyon Mackenzie King did not initially favour Anglin for the position. He repeatedly offered the position to prominent Quebec lawyer Eugène Lafleur, even enlisting Governor General Lord Byng to persuade him, but Lafleur declined each time.

At the time of appointment, Anglin was the third most senior justice on the Court. He was elevated over John Idington, whose declining mental capacity led to his eventual removal in 1927 after Parliament introduced a mandatory retirement age of 75. Also senior was Lyman Duff, widely regarded as the Court's most capable jurist. However, his close association with Robert Borden's Conservative government and rumours of alcoholism made his appointment politically untenable. Duff's biographer, David Ricardo Williams, argues that alcoholism was not the true reason for his exclusion; rather, King sought to strengthen Liberal support in Quebec, where Duff's role on the wartime conscription appeals board had been unpopular. However, historian Ian Bushnell disputes this position. Anglin himself had written to the Department of Justice opposing Duff's promotion, and the tension between them persisted throughout Anglin's tenure as Chief Justice.

King's decision to appoint Anglin may have been influenced by an earlier encounter with the justice. In 1911, while serving as Minister of Labour, King interfered with a case before the Supreme Court that touched upon his grandfather's reputation. (Note: Morang & Co v LeSueur, 1911 CanLII 10, (1911) 45 SCR 95, Supreme Court (Canada)) He and his cousin privately wrote to one of the justices, providing information not on the record that later surfaced in litigation. Historians Snell and Vaughan have suggested that Anglin's dissent in that case, favourable to King's position, may have influenced his appointment as Chief Justice in 1924.

=== Membership of the Court ===
Justices from the Davies Court who continued into the Anglin Court included John Idington of Ontario, Lyman Duff of British Columbia, and Pierre-Basile Mignault and Albert Malouin of Quebec.

On September 16, 1924, Prime Minister William Lyon Mackenzie King appointed Edmund Leslie Newcombe of Nova Scotia to the Supreme Court at the age of 65, filling the vacancy created by Chief Justice Davies's death. Newcombe had been called to the bar in 1883, practised as a litigator, taught insurance law at Dalhousie Law School, and served as Deputy Minister of Justice for thirty-one years. Although the Deputy Minister's role was primarily administrative, Newcombe frequently appeared as counsel before both the Supreme Court and the Judicial Committee of the Privy Council. Historian Ian Bushnell notes that Newcombe was not a strong representative of the Maritimes, having resided in Ottawa for at least three decades before the appointment. Snell and Vaughan note that, although he was rejected for the Chief Justiceship due to his Conservative affiliations, he nonetheless enjoyed strong support within King's Liberal cabinet for appointment as a puisne justice. The appointment was generally well received, though Chief Justice of Ontario William Mulock privately criticized Newcombe for his lack of practical legal experience and that he displayed an excessively dogmatic approach to law.

On October 1, 1924, King appointed Thibaudeau Rinfret of Quebec to the Court at the age of 45, following the resignation of Albert Malouin. Rinfret had been considered for the same vacancy eight months earlier when Malouin was appointed. Called to the bar in 1901, Rinfret was a Liberal who had unsuccessfully contested a seat in the 1908 federal election. He later taught comparative law and public utilities at McGill University and was appointed to the Quebec Superior Court in 1922.

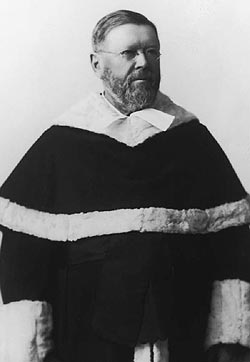
John Idington's diminishing mental capacity was the onus for Parliament to implement a mandatory retirement age of 75 for Supreme Court Justices. He was forced to retire at the age of 87.

In 1927, Parliament amended the Supreme Court Act to expand the Court from six to seven justices and to introduce a mandatory retirement age of 75. (Note: An Act to amend the Supreme Court Act, S.C. 1927, c. 38 (An Act to amend the Supreme Court Act at Archive.org)) The King government had advocated for such a change since at least 1924, repeatedly urging Justice John Idington to retire due to concerns over his declining capacity, a request he appeared to resist. Idington ultimately left the bench on March 31, 1927, when the amendments came into force, ending his tenure through operation of law.

On April 2, 1927, John Henderson Lamont of Saskatchewan was appointed to the Supreme Court at the age of 61, filling the vacancy created by Idington's departure. Lamont's appointment followed sustained lobbying from Prairie politicians seeking regional representation on the Court. The only previous justice from the region, Albert Clements Killam, had served for just a year and a half (1904–1905). Lamont began his legal career in Toronto, where he practised for four years before moving west to Prince Albert in 1899, later serving as Crown Prosecutor. He was elected as a Liberal Member of Parliament in 1904, and, following the creation of Saskatchewan in 1905, he resigned from Parliament to became the province's first Attorney General. In 1907, he was appointed to the Court of King's Bench for Saskatchewan, and in 1918 was elevated to the Court of Appeal after the court's judicial functions were split. His 1927 appointment formally established the tradition of regional balance in the Court's composition by reserving one seat for the Prairie provinces.

On May 18, 1927, Prime Minister William Lyon Mackenzie King appointed Robert Smith of Ontario to the newly created seventh seat on the Supreme Court at the age of 67. Smith was called to the bar in 1885 and had previously served as a Liberal Member of Parliament. In 1922, he was appointed to the High Court Division of the Supreme Court of Ontario, owing to both his legal ability and Liberal party connections. Two years later, he was transferred to the Appellate Division. His appointment to the Supreme Court was grounded in his professional competence, his respected standing at the Ontario bar, and political advocacy from his son, Arnold Neilson Smith, who had been elected to the House of Commons in 1926. Smith sought to negotiate a special pension as a condition of his appointment, but ultimately accepted only a vague government assurance that his retirement would be provided for.

On January 14, 1930, King appointed Lawrence Arthur Dumoulin Cannon of Quebec to the Court at the age of 52, succeeding Pierre-Basile Mignault, who had reached the new mandatory retirement age and stepped down on September 30, 1929. The appointment had been delayed by Minister of Justice Ernest Lapointe, who hoped to coordinate it with the selection of a new Chief Justice of Quebec. Before Cannon's appointment, the position was offered to Louis St. Laurent and possibly Louis-Philippe Demers. Cannon was called to the bar in 1899, practised in Quebec City, and was active in municipal and provincial politics as a Liberal, serving on the Quebec City Council and in the Legislative Assembly of Quebec. In 1927, he was appointed to the Appeal Division of the Court of King's Bench of Quebec.

On September 21, 1932, Prime Minister R. B. Bennett appointed Oswald Smith Crocket of New Brunswick to the Supreme Court at the age of 64, filling the vacancy created by the death of Edmund Leslie Newcombe on December 9, 1931. Bennett had struggled to find a suitable candidate from New Brunswick, even writing to Premier Charles Dow Richards that there was "no one in New Brunswick fitted by training and experience to become a member of the Court." Though a personal friend of Crocket, Bennett hesitated because Crocket's judicial experience was limited to the trial level, with no appellate background. Crocket had been called to the bar in 1891, served as a Conservative Member of Parliament, and was appointed to the Supreme Court of New Brunswick, King's Bench, in 1913. Historians Snell and Vaughan regard his appointment as a weak one, describing Crocket as inflexible and deeply traditionalist, an approach that would later cause friction with Chief Justice Duff.

=== Resignation of Chief Justice Anglin ===
By 1929, Chief Justice Francis Anglin's declining health prompted him to take a leave of absence. That autumn, Prime Minister King described him as "failing [and having] lost all his brightness." Anglin continued to take extended leaves through the early 1930s as his condition worsened. In 1933, he privately discussed retirement with King, who encouraged him to step down. When Anglin hesitated, the government threatened to initiate a formal inquiry into his health and capacity to continue as Chief Justice. Under mounting pressure, he resigned in February 1933, effective February 28. Just three days into retirement, on March 2, 1933, Anglin died.

=== Timeline ===
Bar key:
Laurier appointee Borden appointee King appointee Bennett appointee

== Other branches of government ==
The Anglin Court began during the 14th Canadian Parliament, under a majority government led by Liberal Prime Minister William Lyon Mackenzie King.

The Court existed during the short-lived 15th Parliament during which Arthur Meighen briefly served as Prime Minister for three months in the aftermath of the King–Byng affair. Mackenzie King was elected to a minority government in the 1926 election. In the 1930 election, Richard Bedford Bennett's Conservative Party won a majority government.

== Relationship with the Judicial Committee of the Privy Council ==
From 1867 to 1949, the Judicial Committee of the Privy Council served as the highest court of appeal in Canada, and its decisions on Canadian appeals were binding on all Canadian courts. After the creation of the Supreme Court of Canada, parties could still—if both consented—appeal directly from a provincial court of appeal to the Judicial Committee, bypassing the Supreme Court. This became common practice. By 1900, the Privy Council had become dominant in Canadian jurisprudence, often deciding cases with "little or no restraint or respect" for the decisions of the Canadian courts from which the appeals originated. By the early 20th century, it was regarded as a normal part of the Canadian legal system, no longer limited to exceptional cases, a point the Committee itself stressed when urging Canadian lawyers to bring forward only cases of significance or importance.

In 1895, the Parliament of the United Kingdom amended the Judicial Committee's constituting documents to allow the Queen to summon a limited number of colonial justices. In January 1918, Lyman Duff became the first pusine justice to be appointed to the Privy Council.

- Nadan v R (1926): competency of Parliament to abolish appeals to the Privy Council. Amendments to the Criminal Code passed in 1888 abolishing criminal appeals to the Privy Council was held ultra vires of parliament, which could not abrogate a power which remained invested in the Crown itself. (Note: Frank Nadan (Appeal No. 24 of 1925) v The King (Alberta) [1926] UKPC 13, [1926] AC 482, 1926 CanLII 276 (on appeal from Canada)) Parliament abolished criminal appeals in 1933 following the passage of the Statute of Westminster 1931. (Note: Criminal Code Amendment Act, S.C. 1932–33, c. 53, s. 17)
- Labrador Boundary Dispute (1927): on determining territorial boundary between Newfoundland and Quebec. The Privy Council accepted Newfoundland's border claim, expanding the colony. (Note: The Dominion of Canada of the One Part (Reasons) v The Colony of New Foundland of the other Part (Canada) [1927] UKPC 25, [1927] AC 695 (on appeal from Canada))
- Fish Canneries Reference (1929): on the division of powers in relation to fisheries and methods of determining constitutional jurisdiction. Lord Tomlin held that licensing the packaging and sale of fish was a provincial matter. Additionally, he articulated four principles for determining conflict of law federalism disputes. (Note: The Attorney General of Canada (Appeal No. 73 of 1928) v The Attorney General of British Columbia and others (Canada) [1929] UKPC 80, [1930] AC 111, 1929 CanLII 439 (on appeal from Canada))
- Persons Case (1929): on women being "qualified persons" for the purpose of appointment to the Senate of Canada. Lord Sankey overturned the unanimous Supreme Court, finding the meaning of "qualified persons" could be read broadly to include women. Sankey proposed the "living tree doctrine" of constitutional interpretation, which permitted constitutional documents to be capable of growth and expansion within its natural limits. (Note: Henrietta Muir Edwards and others (Appeal No. 121 of 1928) v The Attorney General of Canada (Canada) [1929] UKPC 86, [1930] AC 124, 1929 CanLII 438 (on appeal from Canada))
- Proprietary Articles Trade Association v Canada (AG) (1931): on Parliament's criminal law authority. Lord Atkin upheld the Supreme Court's ruling and rejected a previous interpretation that froze the scope of the criminal law power to conduct was considered criminal at the time of Confederation. (Note: The Proprietary Articles Trade Association and others (Appeal No.118 of 1929) v The Attorney-General of Canada and others (Canada) [1931] UKPC 11, [1931] AC 310, 1931 CanLII 385 (on appeal from Canada))
- Aeronautics Reference (1931): on federal authority to regulate aviation. Lord Sankey held that aeronautics was a matter of national interest, and Canada had an obligation to enforce international obligations made by the British government on its behalf. (Note: The Attorney-General Canada v The Attorney-General of Ontario and others v The Attorney-General Canada (Canada) [1931] UKPC 93, [1932] AC 54, 1931 CanLII 466 (on appeal from Canada))
- Radio Reference (1932): on the federal authority to regulate radio communication. Viscount Dunedin upheld the Supreme Court majority, finding radio broadcasts and reception fell under federal authority under Section 92(10)(a) regarding telegraphs and other undertakings connecting provinces. (Note: The Attorney General of Quebec (Appeal No. 84 of 1931) v The Attorney General of Canada and others (Canada) [1932] UKPC 7, [1932] AC 304, 1932 CanLII 354 (on appeal from Canada))
- Deeks v Wells (1932): on a copyright claim. Lord Atkin held that a claim of plagiarism and copyright infringement against author H. G. Wells was not made out under the facts at the trial level. (Note: Florence A. Deeks (Appeal No. 18 of 1932) v H.G. Wells and others (Ontario) [1932] UKPC 66, [1932] AC 304, 1932 CanLII 315 (on appeal from Canada))

== Rulings of the Court ==
Below is a selection of rulings of the Anglin Court.

- R v Eastern Terminal Elevator Co (1925): on federal control and regulation of trade and the trade and commerce clause. In a 4–1 decision, the Canada Grain Act was held ultra vires as it regulated ownership of surplus grain and profits of an industry where all parties were located in a single province. (Note: The King v Eastern Terminal Elevator Co, 1925 CanLII 82, (1925) SCR 434, Supreme Court (Canada))
- Reference re Waters and Water-Powers (1929): on Federal-Provincial authority relating to navigable river bed title and power generation. The Supreme Court largely declined to answer the reference questions. (Note: Reference re Waters and Water-Powers, 1929 CanLII 72, (1929) SCR 200, Supreme Court (Canada))
- Lawson v Interior Tree Fruit and Vegetable Committee of Direction (1930): on a provincial fruit marketing scheme and export levy. A unanimous Supreme Court held the British Columbia Produce Marketing Act was ultra vires as it encroached the federal authority to regulate trade and commerce. Justice Duff articulated four characteristics to distinguish a tax from a levy. (Note: Lawson v Interior Tree Fruit and Vegetable Committee of Direction, 1930 CanLII 91, (1931) SCR 357, Supreme Court (Canada))

== Administration of the Court ==
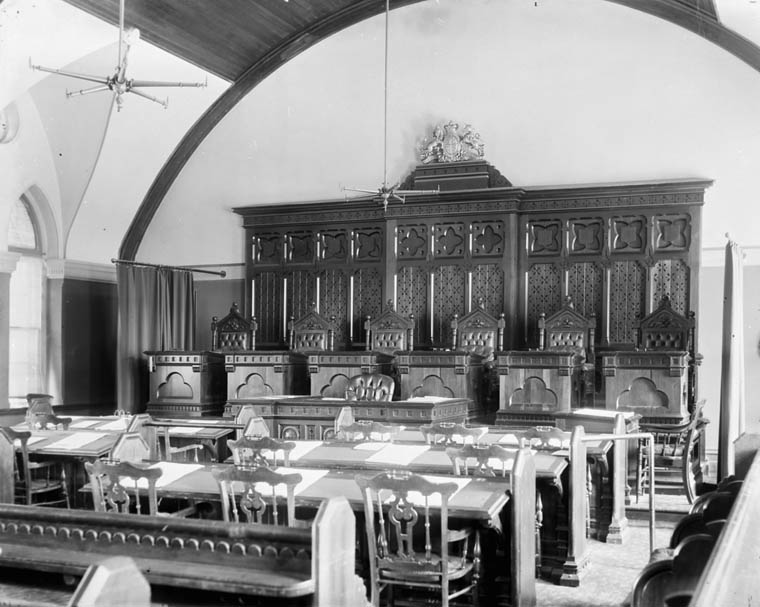
Interior of the Second Supreme Court of Canada Building showing the desks of the six justices of the Court.

The Court operated with a panel of six judges, with a quorum of four, meaning that if there was an equal division (3–3), the appeal would be dismissed. Under the Supreme Court Act, the Court held three sessions per year. The Chief Justice was authorized to appoint an ad hoc judge from the Exchequer Court or from among the provincial chief justices if the Court could not achieve quorum. By 1927, twelve different lower court judges had served on an ad hoc basis in at least 125 cases. Robert Smith, who served as an ad hoc justice in 1926, was appointed to the Court in 1927.

In 1927, Parliament amended the Supreme Court Act to create a seventh position on the Court and to establish a mandatory retirement age of 75. Issues related to achieving quorum, the advanced age of several justices, and the growing administrative duties of judges outside their courtroom functions made the change necessary to ensure the Court could continue to operate effectively.

In its early years, the Court did not sit at a shared bench; instead, each justice had an individual desk. Historians Snell and Vaughan note that this arrangement coincided with a period in the 1880s marked by deep divisions within the Court and a lack of "consultation and cooperation" among the justices. It was also common for each justice to write individual reasons for judgment rather than issuing joint judgments. Frequent tied votes and individual judgments made it difficult to establish clear precedents or discern a coordinated judicial approach. As a result, the Court tended to resolve disputes by applying existing principles rather than developing new legal standards. Under Chief Justice Anglin, this individualist approach began to change. In the 1920s, there was a growing call from the Canadian Bar Association to encourage the publication of decisions with a single majority judgment. Anglin took an active role in persuading his colleagues to write unified decisions. Generally, if there was agreement on the outcome, one justice would volunteer to draft and circulate the decision for comment. However, if there was no initial agreement, each justice would prepare individual drafts to be exchanged among the members.

The Court recognized the right of applicants from Quebec to use either English or French. While French-language materials were accepted, they were translated into English at the Court's expense. The Supreme Court Act required the Court to publish its own decisions rather than relying on private law reporters. Judgments published in the Supreme Court Reports were printed in the language in which they were delivered and were not translated.

=== Costs and salaries of the Court ===
The cost of operating the Supreme Court steadily increased—from $54,530 in 1880 (equivalent to $1,873,577 in 2025), to $60,840 in 1890 (equivalent to $2,308,049 in 2025), $66,087 in 1900 (equivalent to $2,657,203 in 2025), to $150,000 in 1930 (equivalent to $2,706,593 in 2025).

Similarly salaries of the justices grew from $7,000 (equivalent to $240,511 in 2025), with the Chief Justice receiving an additional $1,000 in the 1880s, to $9,000 (equivalent to $301,469 in 2025), with an additional $1,000 for the Chief Justice in 1906; finally to $12,000 (equivalent to $172,842 in 2025), with an additional $3,000 for the Chief Justice in 1920. However, they remained among the lowest paid in comparison with their counterparts in other common law jurisdictions.

=== Growing political role of the Court ===
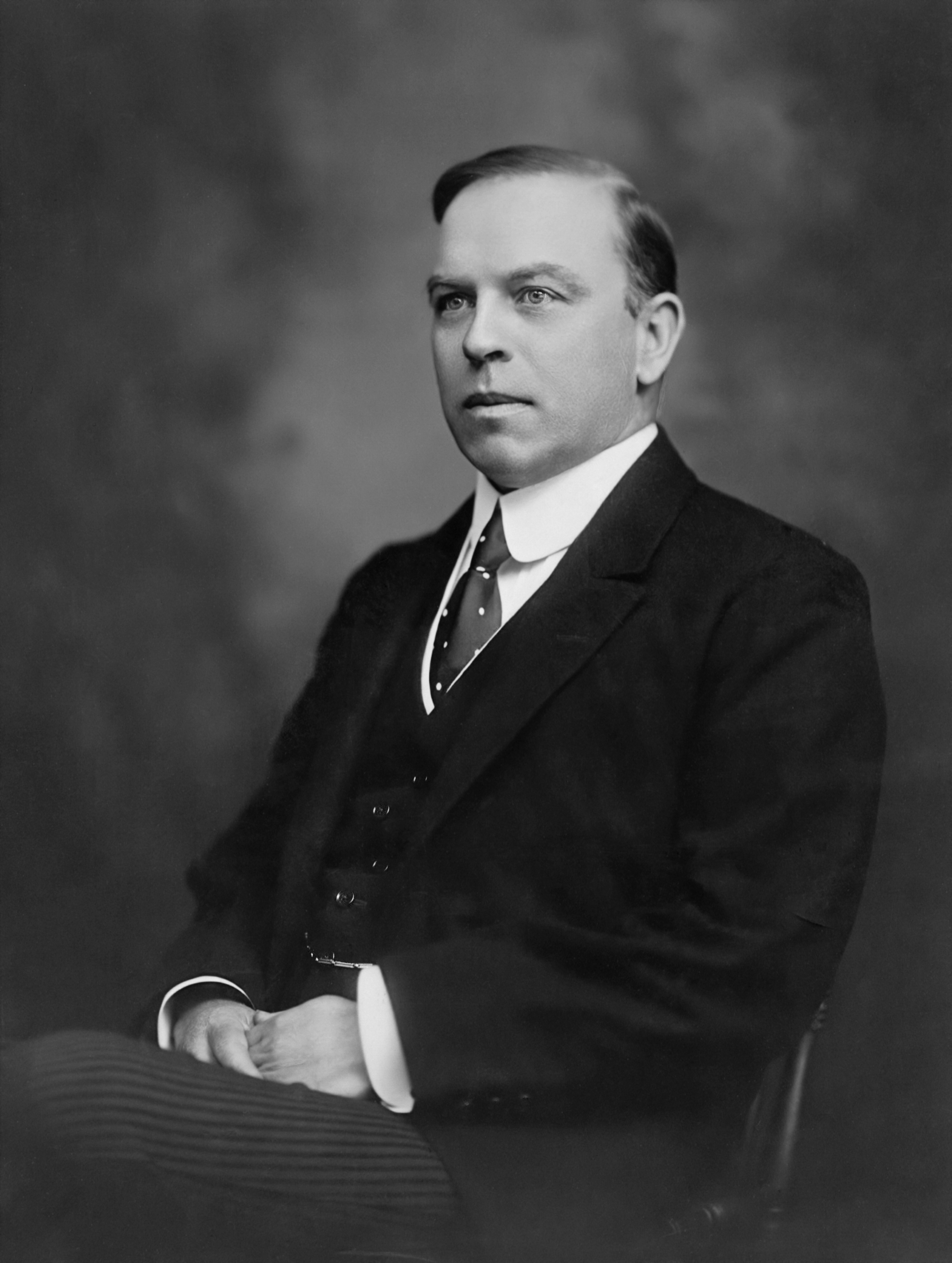
As Prime Minister, William Lyon Mackenzie King used the reference question and the Supreme Court as a method to avoid politically costly debates on federalism issues.

Snell and Vaughan note that in the Court's early decades, close connections and political involvement between the justices and the government were both common and encouraged, and were not regarded as inappropriate. By 1920, the idea among political actors that the Supreme Court could serve as a useful political instrument was well entrenched. For instance, political interference was evident during an appeal concerning the validity of the Canada Temperance Act. During the proceedings, Minister of Justice Charles Doherty summoned Justices Anglin and Mignault to ascertain the likely views of the Court and the probable outcome should the government introduce an amendment while the appeal was pending.

With some exceptions, Sir Wilfrid Laurier's appointments to the Court were highly partisan. In the early twentieth century, the justices themselves became increasingly entangled in national politics, both through appointments to government bodies and through the growing use of reference questions. As these references became more overtly political, they exposed the Court to sustained criticism from the Conservative opposition. In 1922, Parliament expanded the Court's jurisdiction to include appeals from provincial reference questions. (Note: An Act to Amend the Supreme Court Act, S.C. 1922, c. 48) Prime Minister William Lyon Mackenzie King soon used the reference procedure strategically to deflect the political consequences of divisive federalism disputes. For instance, the newly enacted Board of Commerce Act authorized the Board to refer questions of law to the Supreme Court. (Note: The Board of Commerce Act, S.C. 1919, c. 37, s. 32)

=== Expansion of duties of justices ===
Beginning in the late 1890s, Supreme Court justices increasingly accepted additional roles at the government's request, reflecting both the Court's growing stature and its deeper involvement in public affairs beyond the bench. These political and quasi-judicial roles reflected a gradual increase in respect for the Court, but also reinforced the view that it was a political tool rather than an institution separate from government.

In 1932, with Chief Justice Anglin out of the country, Justice Duff was authorized to act as a deputy to the Governor General for the vice-regal tour of the western provinces. When Anglin returned earlier than expected, he protested Duff's appointment to a position he believed he was rightfully his.

In 1931, Justice Duff was named chairman of the Royal Commission into Railways and Transportation in Canada. When the commission completed its final report in 1932, Duff under severe stress suffered what Prime Minister R.B. Bennett described as a "complete nervous breakdown" and was hospitalized.

== Legal philosophy of the Court ==
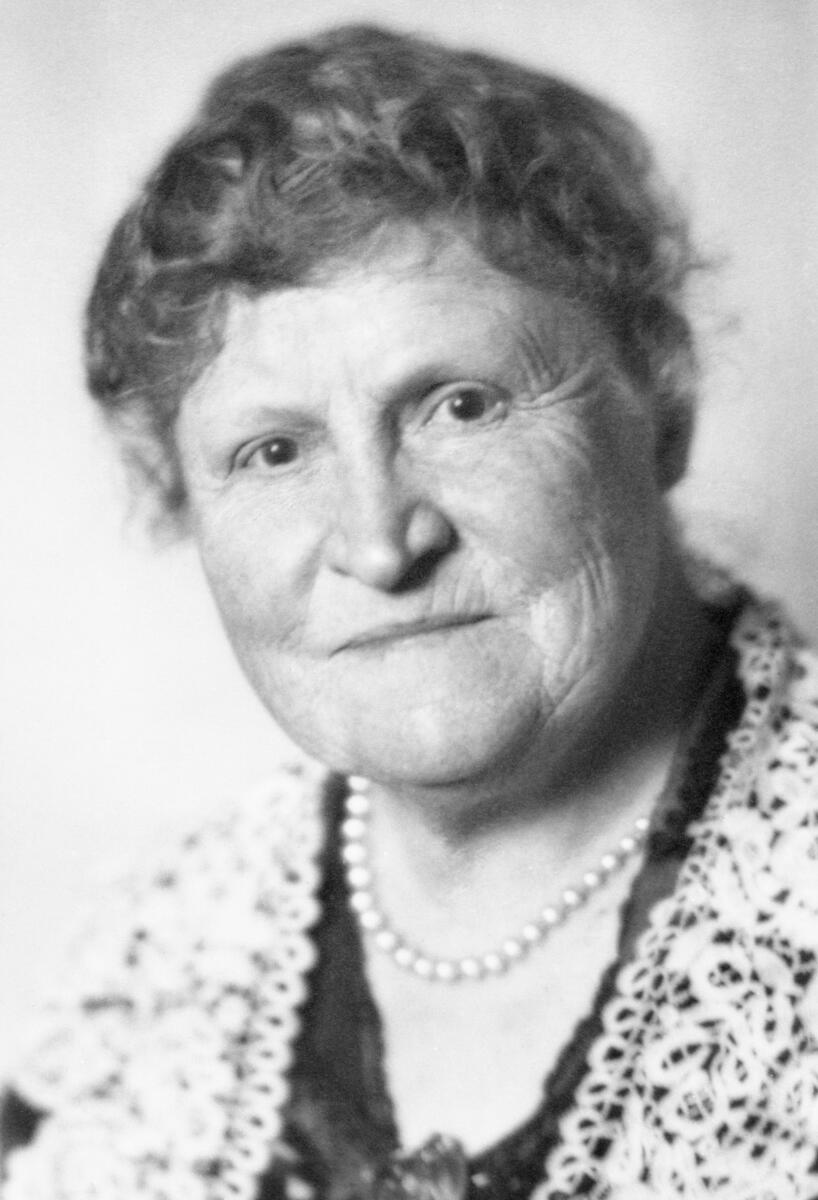
Henrietta Edwards the lead plaintiff in the Persons case.

Between 1906 and 1944, the Supreme Court heard over 200 constitutional cases. In cases concerning federalism and the distribution of powers, justices such as Lyman Duff sought to limit the scope of the federal Peace, Order, and Good Government power to prevent intrusions into provincial matters. On the opposite side, Chief Justice Anglin supported an expansive interpretation of federal authority. Newcombe is described as having a slight federal authority lean in his decisions.

Justice Mignault's tenure on the Court began a period of new sensitivity to civil law cases. A firm pattern for addressing civil law cases emerged, where previously the Court often used common law principles. This approach was continued by Justice Rinfret following Mignault's retirement

The Court remained judicially conservative, relying heavily on narrow definitions and precedent. For instance, in the Persons case, a unanimous Court held that women were not "qualified persons" for the purpose of being appointed to the Senate of Canada. The Court maintained that it was for the legislature to make such a change.

== Appraisal ==
Historian Ian Bushnell describes the Supreme Court from 1903 to 1929, covering the Taschereau, Fitzpatrick, Davies, and Anglin Courts, as "the sterile years." During this period, disunity in decision-making reached new heights, making it difficult to discern overarching legal principles. As a result, the Court's jurisprudence was of limited value. This made retaining appeals to the Privy Council attractive, since a single decision from London provided greater certainty in the law.

Criticism focused on the politically motivated nature of many judicial appointments. While some legal journals occasionally defended the Court against press criticism, Bushnell notes these defences were motivated more by a desire to uphold the credibility of the legal system as a whole, than to support the Court itself. Prime Minister Wilfrid Laurier appointed 10 justices and had the opportunity to shape the Court, but, there was no consistent approach to appointments during the era. Appointments were a mix of merit, patronage, and government interests, rather than what was best for the long-term development of the Court. Prime Minister Mackenzie King's appointment of Albert Malouin who was not in physical condition to sit on the Court, nor did not want the appointment demonstrated the minimal care put into appointments at the time. The political nature of appointments, combined with the Court's use as a political tool by successive prime ministers contributed to institutional decline.

In its written decisions, the Court's reasoning during this period was largely formulaic and conservative, likely because it still regarded itself as an intermediate appellate body to the Privy Council. As a result, the Court made little contribution to the development of Canadian law and issued decisions that sometimes drew ridicule from both the public and the legal community.

== See also ==
- Supreme Court of Canada cases
