= Bedard v Dawson =

- Supreme Court of Canada

Hearing: May 17, 1923 Judgment: June 15, 1923
- Full case name: Dame D. Bedard v. Owen Dawson
- Citations: [1923] S.C.R. 681
- Prior history: Judgment for Dawson by the Court of King's Bench, Appeal Side, Province of Quebec.
- Ruling: Appeal dismissed.

Holding
- Although the federal government has exclusive authority to legislate criminal law, the provinces can enact legislation to prevent crime.

Court membership
- Chief Justice: Louis Henry Davies; Puisne Justices: John Idington, Lyman Duff, Francis Alexander Anglin, Louis-Philippe Brodeur, Pierre-Basile Mignault

Reasons given
- Seriatim opinion: Idington J.
- Seriatim opinion: Duff J.
- Seriatim opinion: Anglin J.
- Seriatim opinion: Brodeur J.
- Seriatim opinion: Mignault J.
- Davies C.J. took no part in the consideration or decision of the case.

Bédard v Dawson, [1923] S.C.R. 681 is a leading constitutional decision of the Supreme Court of Canada. The Court held that the provinces could legislate in matters related to the prevention of crime even though the federal government had exclusive power over criminal law.

The law was passed by the Quebec legislature and allowed for private citizens to apply to the Court to close down a premises if it was being used as a "disorderly house". The Court upheld a provincial Act on the grounds that the law was in relation to property and civil rights and not criminal matters as was the case for an equivalent provision in the criminal code regarding "disorderly houses".

Justice Idington wrote that:

Indeed, the duty to protect neighbouring property owners in such cases as are involved in this question before us renders the question hardly arguable. There are many instances of other nuisances which can be better rectified by local legislation within the power of the legislatures over property and civil rights than by designating them crimes and leaving them to be dealt with by Parliament as such. (p. 684)

In separate reasons, Justice Anglin added:

I am of the opinion that this statute in no way impinges on the domain of the criminal law but is concerned exclusively with the control and enjoyment of property and the safeguarding of the community from the consequences of an illegal and injurious use being made of it--a pure matter of civil right. In my opinion in enacting the statute now under consideration a legislature exercises the power which it undoubtedly possesses to provide for the suppression of a nuisance and the prevention of its recurrence by civil process. (p. 685)

== See also ==
- Nova Scotia Board of Censors v. McNeil (1978) - similar case.
- List of Supreme Court of Canada cases (Richards Court through Fauteux Court)
