= R v Eastern Terminal Elevator Co =

- Supreme Court of Canada

Hearing: 9–10 March 1925 Judgment: 5 May 1925
- Full case name: The King v. Eastern Terminal Elevator Co.
- Citations: 1925 CanLII 82, [1925] SCR 434
- Prior history: APPEAL from the judgment of the Exchequer Court of Canada, [1924] ExCR 167
- Ruling: Judgment of the Exchequer Court affirmed.

Holding
- It is not within the power of Parliament to regulate in the provinces particular occupations by a licensing system and otherwise, and of local works and undertakings, as such, however important and beneficial the ultimate purpose of the legislation may be.

Court membership
- Chief Justice: Francis Alexander Anglin; Puisne Justices: John Idington, Lyman Duff, Pierre-Basile Mignault, Edmund Leslie Newcombe, Thibaudeau Rinfret

Reasons given
- Majority: Duff J, joined by Rinfret J
- Majority: Mignault J
- Majority: Idington J
- Dissent: Anglin CJC

R v Eastern Terminal Elevator Co is an early constitutional decision of the Supreme Court of Canada on the Constitution's Trade and Commerce power.

== Background ==
The Canada Grain Act was passed in 1912 to control and regulate, through The Board of Grain Commissioners, the trade in grain. It provided for:

- the licensing of all owners and operators of elevators, warehouses and mills and certain traders in grain;
- the supervision of the handling and storage of grain in and out of elevators, etc.; and
- the prohibition of persons operating or interested in a terminal elevator from buying or selling grain, as well as
- provisions for inspection and grading.

The Act was amended in 1919 by adding s. 95(7), which provided that, if at the end of any crop year in any terminal elevator "the total surplus of grain is found in excess of one-quarter of one per cent of the gross amount of the grain received in the elevator during the crop year," such surplus would be sold for the benefit of the Board.

For the 1920 crop year, Eastern Elevator was determined to have a surplus of 1,107,330 pounds, found in its elevator at Port Arthur, Ontario. The Board commenced an action in the Exchequer Court of Canada to recover the value of such grain, which was calculated to be $43,431. Eastern Elevator, in its defence, pleaded there was no surplus, and that s. 95(7), as well as The Canada Grain Act itself, always were and are now ultra vires of the Parliament of Canada.

== At the Exchequer Court ==
Alexander Kenneth Maclean, President of the Exchequer Court, confined his ruling to the effect of s. 95(7) only, determining it to be ultra vires. In stating this, he ruled that:

- it dealt with the right of ownership of the surplus of grain, as well as
- being an attempt to regulate profits or dealings which give rise to profits,

both of which fell within the provincial jurisdiction over property and civil rights.

The ruling was appealed to the Supreme Court.

== At the Supreme Court of Canada ==
The Exchequer Court's ruling was affirmed.

In his ruling, Duff J held that the marketing of grain, even though it was all destined for export (some of the grain stored on the site was for local markets), fell under provincial jurisdiction with respect to property and civil rights. However, the Parliament of Canada could still assume jurisdiction if it invoked its power with respect to works and undertakings.

Mignault J, in his ruling, also rejected the idea that the matter could be regarded as a "national emergency" under the residual peace, order and good government power. He also rejected the federal contention that s. 95(7) could be supported under s. 95 of the British North America Act, as it dealt not with agriculture but with a product of agriculture, and therefore was an article of trade.

Anglin CJC, in dissent, held that the Act could be upheld as a matter of national concern, citing jurisprudence dating back to Russell v. The Queen.

== Impact ==
Following the decision, the Canada Grain Act was amended to declare all grain elevators in Canada to be federal "works and undertakings" for the general advantage of Canada.

Eastern Elevator was subsequently cited in 1936 by Duff CJ in his ruling in the Natural Products Marketing Reference, which was cited with approval by Lord Atkin on appeal to the Privy Council. Lord Atkin's approval was later cited in support of the Privy Council's 1950 ruling in the Margarine Reference, in that part dealing with the federal trade and commerce power.

The decision represents a high point of the Supreme Court's adoption of the Privy Council's view of an exceptionally narrow interpretation of the federal government's trade and commerce power, which began to be relaxed in 1971 in Caloil Inc. v. Canada.
