= Deeks v Wells =

Canadian court case on plagiarism (1932)

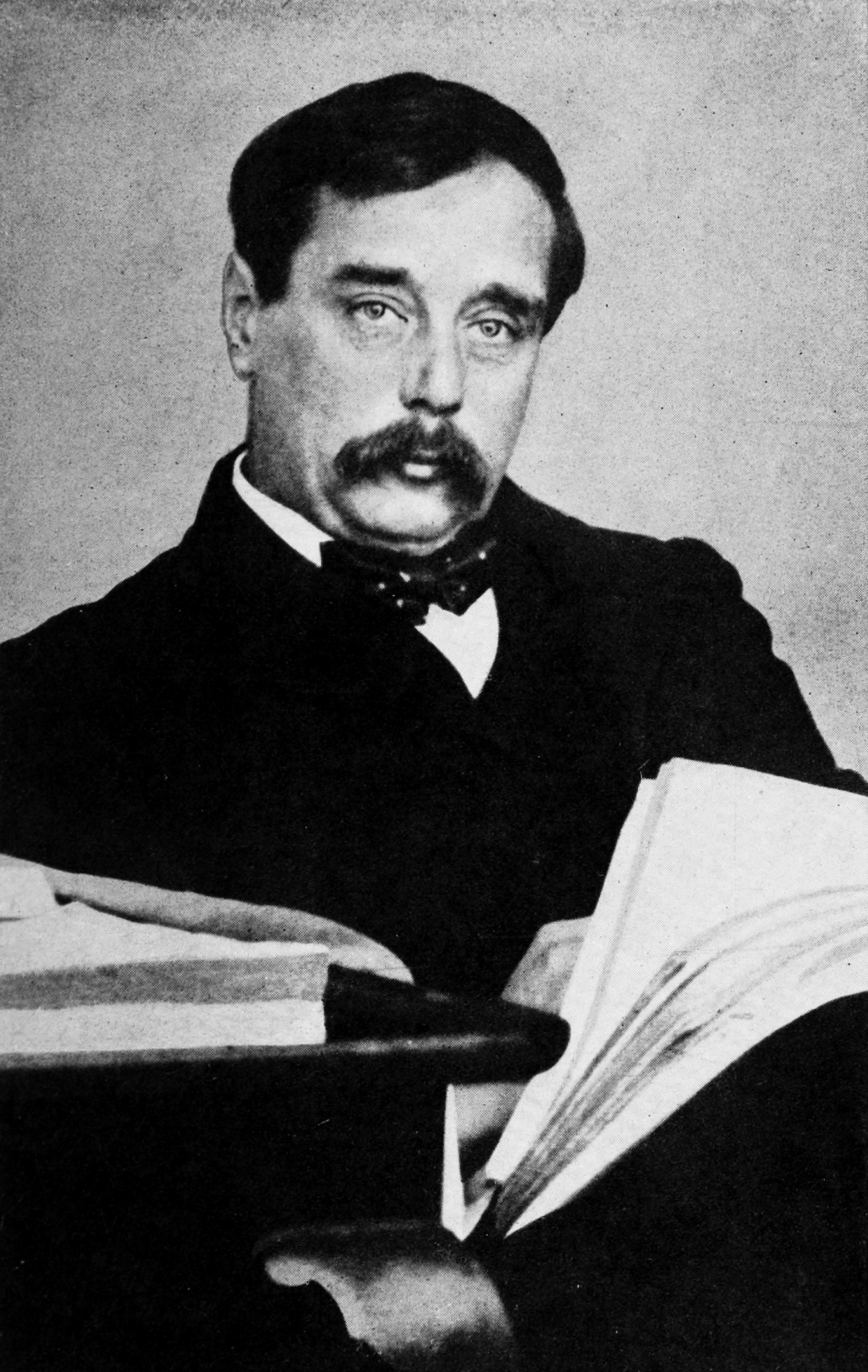
- H.G. Wells, the main defendant in the court case
- Court: Judicial Committee of the Privy Council
- Full case name: Florence A. Deeks v H.G. Wells and others
- Decided: November 3, 1932
- Citations: [1932] UKPC 66, 1932 CanLII 315 (UK JCPC), [1933] 1 DLR 353

Case history
- Prior actions: Deeks v. Wells, 1931 CanLII 157, [1931] 4 DLR 533, [1931] OR 818
- Appealed from: Ontario Supreme Court (Appellate Division)

Court membership
- Judges sitting: Lord Atkin, Lord Tomlin, Lord Thankerton

Case opinions
- Decision by: Lord Atkin

Keywords
- Copyright, breach of trust, plagiarism

Deeks v Wells was a Canadian court case between a Canadian writer, Florence Deeks, and the English writer, H.G. Wells. Deeks alleged that Wells had plagiarised from her draft book, The Web of the World's Romance, in writing his own book, The Outline of History, thereby breaching her copyright. She also alleged breach of trust by the Canadian, American, and British Macmillan publishing companies. The case was finally decided in favour of Wells by the Judicial Committee of the Privy Council, at that time the highest court of appeal for the British Empire, including Canada.

== Background ==
Deeks was born in 1864 in Morrisburg, Canada West in a family that valued education for women. At age 30, she enrolled to study at Victoria College, Toronto. Some years later she began teaching at Presbyterian Ladies' College, and was active in the Women's Art Association of Canada and the Toronto women's Liberal Club. She conceived the idea of writing a history of the world from a feminist perspective, emphasising women's contributions. She worked on the project for four years, completing her manuscript in 1918, with the title The Web of the World's Romance. In August 1918, she submitted it to Macmillan of Canada, the Canadian arm of the British publishing house, Macmillan Company, which also controlled the American Macmillan Company. Macmillan of Canada kept the manuscript for at least half a year, but then returned it to Deeks at some point in 1919, declining to publish it.

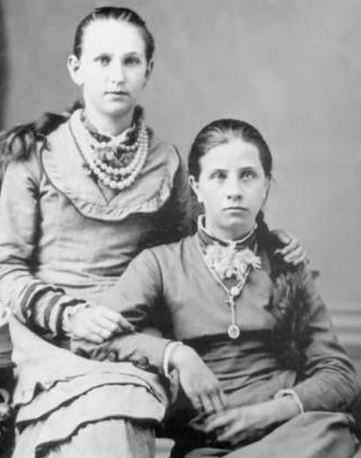
Florence Deeks (right) with her older sister, around 1880

In the late autumn of 1918, some months after Deeks left her manuscript with Macmillan in Toronto, Wells began working on his history of the world. He initially approached Macmillan of Britain to publish the book, but when they passed on it, he was able to get Macmillan of New York and two other British publishing firms interested. Originally issued in serial form starting in 1919, The Outline of History was published in a two-volume set in 1920.

At some point, Deeks became aware of Wells' book. She reviewed it and became convinced that Wells had had access to her own manuscript when he was writing his book. Eventually, in 1926 she sued Wells and the various publishing houses for breach of copyright and breach of trust, alleging that Macmillan of Canada had sent her manuscript to Britain, where Wells had used it, plagiarising it for his own work. She brought the action in the Ontario courts and sought damages of $500,000.

== Decisions of the Ontario courts ==
=== Trial decision ===
Justice Raney, who ruled against Deeks at trial

The case was tried before Justice Raney of the High Court division of the Supreme Court of Ontario, sitting without a jury. Deeks did not have any direct evidence that Macmillan in Toronto had sent the manuscript to Britain, or that Wells had access to it. Instead, she relied on comparisons between her text and the Wells book, alleging that in outline and approach, there were clear indications that Wells had relied on her manuscript. She called three expert witnesses in literature, including Professor William A. Irwin, who specialised in textual analysis of ancient languages. Irwin had prepared an extensive comparison of the two texts and testified that in his opinion it was clear that Wells had access to Deeks' manuscript. The other two witnesses, Lawrence Burpee and George S. Brett supported that contention, but not as strongly.

Wells testified in his own defence. He flatly denied the allegation that he had used the Deeks manuscript, stating that he had never seen nor heard of it. Representatives of the Macmillan company also testified that no improper use was made of the manuscript.

The trial judge rejected the evidence of the witnesses called by Deeks:

But the extracts I have quoted, and the other scores of pages of Professor Irwin's memorandum, are just solemn nonsense. His comparisons are without significance, and his argument and conclusions are alike puerile. Like Gratiano, Professor Irwin spoke "an infinite deal of nothing;" his reasons are not even "two grains of wheat hidden in two bushels of chaff." They are not reasons at all. There could not be an original history of the World, unless perhaps the "Compendium of Universal History," said to have been written by Macaulay before he was eight years old, might lay claim to that distinction. All universal histories must, necessarily, be based upon the writings of previous authors. That was true both of Miss Deeks' manuscript and of Mr. Wells' book.

He also stated that he accepted the defence evidence of Wells and the Macmillan representatives, rejecting "Professor Irwin's fantastic hypotheses". He therefore dismissed the action, and ordered Deeks to pay court costs to the defendants.

=== Appellate decision ===
Deeks then appealed to the Appellate Division of the Ontario Supreme Court. She argued her case herself, but without success. The four judges of the Appellate Division agreed the appeal should be dismissed with costs.

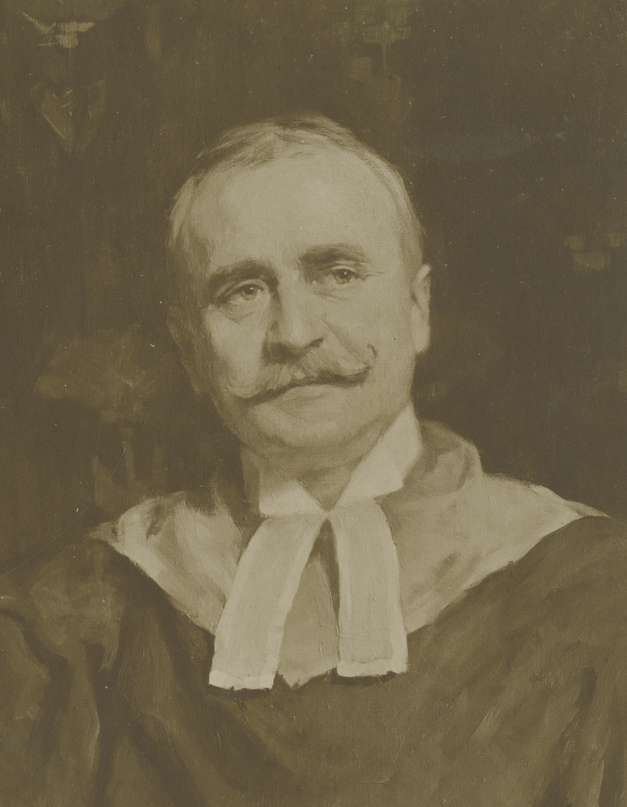
Justice Riddell, who ruled against Deeks on appeal

The longest of the opinions was given by Justice Riddell, who focussed on the comparative evidence given by Professor Irwin. Justice Riddell agreed with the trial judge that Irwin's analysis was not at all compelling. He held that in writing history, authors inevitably rely on similar sources and may make similar errors, but that is not itself proof of a copyright violation. He also rejected the argument that it would have been physically impossible for Wells to have written The Outline in the time he had available to him.

Chief Justice Latchford (with whom Justice Masten concurred) wrote a shorter opinion, where he commented that the evidence was convincing that the Canadian Macmillan Company had never sent the manuscript to Britain. He also noted Wells' positive testimony that he never saw the manuscript, nor heard of Deeks. Justice Orde similarly commented that there was no direct evidence that Wells had ever seen the manuscript, and also held that histories on similar topics will use similar terms and organization. The similarities which Deeks alleged were not enough to rebut the denials by the defence witnesses.

== Decision of the Judicial Committee of the Privy Council ==
Deeks then appealed to the Judicial Committee of the Privy Council, at that time the highest court of appeal for the British Empire and Commonwealth, including Canada. Under the law at the time, she could appeal directly from the Ontario Appellate Division to the Judicial Committee, bypassing the Supreme Court of Canada. She could not afford a lawyer, and argued the case herself, in her late sixties. The panel hearing the appeal was composed of Lord Atkin, Lord Tomlin and Lord Thankerton.

Lord Atkin gave the decision for the Judicial Committee. He began by noting that both the courts below agreed on the basic facts, and had concluded that there was no evidence that Wells ever saw the manuscript. The Judicial Committee's normal approach was not to re-hear an evidential issue of that type, but since Deeks appeared in person and was strongly committed to her case, they had decided that it was important to hear the appeal.

However, Lord Atkin concluded that he agreed with the factual conclusions of the lower courts. He cited the evidence of Wells, who denied that he had ever seen the manuscript, and also the evidence of a Mr Saul, who had been responsible for reviewing the manuscript at Macmillan of Canada. Saul testified that the manuscript had always been in his possession. Lord Atkin also mentioned the testimony of Sir Frederick Macmillan, the chairman of the board of Macmillan in England, who testified that every manuscript came before the board, and the Deeks manuscript had never done so. Based on the review of the evidence, Lord Atkin concluded that the manuscript had never left Canada, had never been given to Wells, and Wells had not used it.

Lord Atkin also reviewed the evidence put forth by the literary experts. Like the lower courts, he concluded that the evidence was not sufficient to rebut the direct evidence that the manuscript had never left Canada. He agreed that what similarities existed could be explained by the common nature of the topics and the common sources used by both authors. He also agreed with Justice Raney's categorization of Irwin's evidence as "fantastic". In closing, Lord Atkin commented that Deeks had argued the case "with great candour and great force", but had failed to convince them of the points in issue. The appeal was therefore dismissed, with costs.

As was the practice of the Judicial Committee at that time, Lord Atkin gave the decision for the entire committee, with no reasons from any of the other judges.

== Legacy ==
The case continues to be cited as an authority by the Canadian courts, most recently by the Federal Court in 2021. It is also cited in support of various propositions by the Canadian Enycyclopedic Digest, one of the general outlines of Canadian law.

Some seventy years after the decision of the Judicial Committee, Deeks v Wells became the topic of a scholarly debate about women in the Canadian court system. In 2000, A.B. McKillop, a professor of history at Carleton University, published a book entitled The Spinster and the Prophet, a study of Deeks' allegations against Wells, and her treatment by the Ontario courts. McKillop theorised that Deeks had not received fair treatment by the courts, which were biased towards men. Four years later, Denis Magnusson, a retired professor of law at Queen's University Faculty of Law who specialised in intellectual property, published an article with an opposing view. He argued that Deeks had a weak case on the evidence and received a fair trial. Magnusson concluded that the case would have been decided in the same way in 2004, under current Canadian copyright law.
