= William Glenholme Falconbridge =

Canadian lawyer and judge

Sir William Glenholme Falconbridge
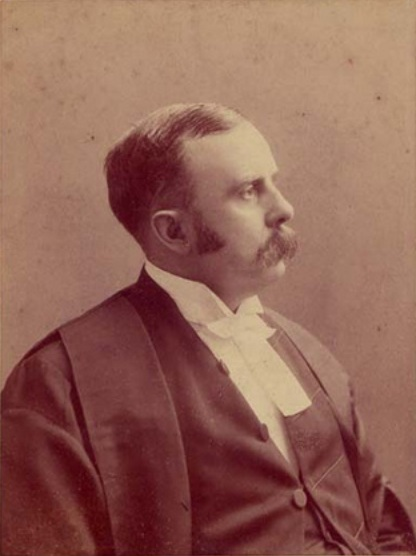
- Born: May 12, 1846; Drummondville (Niagara Falls), Canada West
- Died: February 8, 1920 (aged 73); Toronto, Ontario

Sir William Glenholme Falconbridge, KC (May 12, 1846 – February 8, 1920) was a Canadian lawyer and judge in Ontario, Canada.

Born in Drummondville (now Niagara Falls, Ontario), Upper Canada, he was the son of John Kennedy Falconbridge, an Irish immigrant, and Sarah Fralick. Falconbridge studied at the Richmond Hill grammar school, Barrie grammar school, and at the Model Grammar School in Toronto. He received a BA degree in 1866 from University College, University of Toronto. He served as the chair of modern languages at Yarmouth Seminary in Nova Scotia for his health and then returned to Toronto where he was a lecturer in Spanish and Italian at University College. At the same time, he studied law with the law firm Morphy, Sullivan, and Fenton. He also studied with the firm of Patton, Osler, and Moss before being called to the Ontario Bar in 1871. He practiced law in the firm of Harrison, Osler, and Moss. In 1879, he was made a partner of the firm.

In 1870, he received an MA degree from the University of Toronto and was registrar of the University from 1872 to 1881. In 1873, he married Mary Phoebe, the daughter of Robert Baldwin Sullivan. He was made a bencher of the Law Society of Upper Canada and created a Queen's Counsel in 1885.

In 1887, he was appointed a judge in the Queen's Bench division of Ontario's High Court of Justice. In 1900, he was appointed Chief Justice of the King's Bench, High Court of Justice of the Province of Ontario.

From 1905 to 1908 he served as Chair of the Toronto Public Library Board.

In 1908, he was made a Knight Bachelor.

In 1918, the Supreme Court of Canada was forced to suspend a sitting due to unavailability of its members, the government passed a bill permitting the Chief Justice to appoint an ad hoc judge from the Exchequer Court or a provincial chief justice. In practice, the Court appointed ad hoc justices based on proximity, bringing Falconbridge in when Justice Lyman Duff of British Columbia, or Charles Fitzpatrick of Quebec were absent.

Falconbridge died of pneumonia in Toronto at the age of 73. The geographic township of Falconbridge was named in his honour.

== Bibliography ==
- "William Glenholme Falconbridge". Dictionary of Canadian Biography (online ed.). University of Toronto Press. 1979–2016.
