= Pierre-Basile Mignault =

Canadian judge

The Honourable Pierre-Basile Mignault
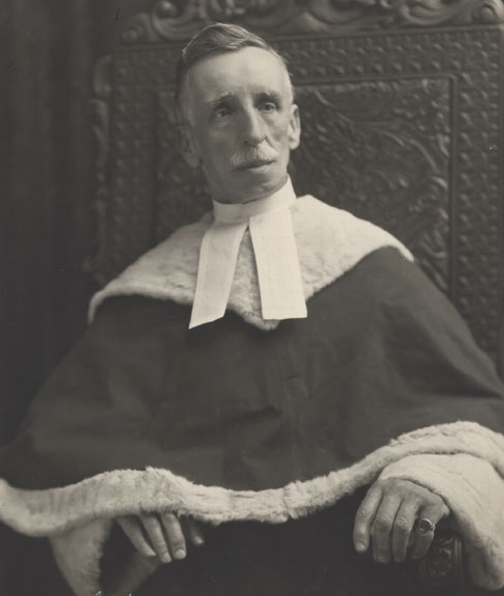

Puisne Justice of the Supreme Court of Canada
- In office October 25, 1918 – September 29, 1929
- Nominated by: Robert Borden
- Preceded by: Louis Henry Davies
- Succeeded by: Lawrence Arthur Dumoulin Cannon

Personal details
- Born: September 30, 1854 Worcester, Massachusetts, United States
- Died: October 15, 1945 (aged 91) Montreal, Quebec, Canada
- Education: McGill University (BCL)
- Occupation: lawyer, professor, judge

Pierre-Basile Mignault (September 30, 1854 – October 15, 1945) was a Canadian lawyer and Puisne Justice of the Supreme Court of Canada.

== Early life ==
Mignault was born on September 30, 1854, in Worcester, Massachusetts. The son of Pierre-Basile Mignault, a French-Canadian physician, and Catherine O'Callaghan, of Irish descent. The language of his home in childhood was English. The family relocated to Montreal when Mignault was still a child, where his father established a medical practice. Mignault studied law at McGill University, graduating with a Bachelor of Civil Law degree in 1878. He was called to the bar the same year and began his legal practice in Montreal. He later returned to McGill as a professor of civil law.

From 1895 to 1916, Mignault published Droit civil canadien, a nine-volume work on Québec's civil law. The work focused on the civil law and its relation to the French tradition, continues to be cited by the courts, including the Supreme Court of Canada.

== Justice of the Supreme Court of Canada ==
On October 25, 1918, Prime Minister Robert Borden appointed Mignault to fill the vacancy created by Charles Fitzpatrick's resignation. Snell and Vaughan describe his appointment as strong, bringing scholarly depth and 40 years of legal practice. Others considered for the vacancy included Justice Minister Charles Doherty, Eugène Lafleur, and Louis-Philippe Pelletier.

As a judge on the Supreme Court of Canada, Mignault also had a key role in countering a long-standing centralising tendency in Canadian private law, and in increasing the Court's sensitivity to the subtleties of Québec's legal tradition. Mignault saw Québec private law as "surtout fille de la France coutumière" (particularly the heir of French pre-revolutionary customary law), yet also a meeting place for a diversity of philosophical and cultural approaches.

In the Persons case, Mignault in separate reasons from Chief Justice Anglin, agreed that women were not persons for the purpose of appointment to the Senate of Canada. Rather than Anglin's narrow originalist interpretation of the framer's intent for the Constitution Act, 1867, Mignault argued summoning women to the Senate was a "grave constitutional change" that required approval by the Imperial Parliament. (Note: Reference re meaning of the word “Persons” in s.24 of British North America Act, 1928 CanLII 55, (1928) SCR 276, Supreme Court (Canada))

In 1927, Parliament amended the Supreme Court Act to create a seventh position on the Court and set a mandatory retirement age of 75. (Note: An Act to amend the Supreme Court Act, S.C. 1927, c. 38 (An Act to amend the Supreme Court Act at Archive.org)) Justice John Idington became the first to reach mandatory retirement, as he was 87 when the act came into force. Mignault became the second justice to reach the mandatory retirement age, resigning on his 75th birthday on September 30, 1929.

Supreme Court historians Snell and Vaughan note that Mignault was an example of the pitfalls of a mandatory retirement age, as he continued to be active and pulling his weight on the Court. There is no evidence the government was asked for, or considered an exemption to mandatory retirement for Mignault.

== Later life ==
In retirement, Mignault continued to publish scholary articles. He died on October 15, 1945, in Montreal. He is buried in Notre Dame des Neiges Cemetery. Parc Mignault in Montreal is named in his honour.

== Legacy ==
Snell and Vaughan describe Mignault as the Supreme Court's "first great defender of the civil law." During his time on the Court, a firm pattern for addressing civil law cases emerged, where previously the Court often used common law principles for these cases. As a justice, Mignault warned the Quebec judiciary and bar of the risk that applying English common law would have in subverting the distinctive nature of Quebec's civil law tradition. During their time on the Court together Mignault, together with Thibaudeau Rinfret were in the majority of 57 of 59 reported judgments on civil law cases at the Supreme Court, with Rinfret authoring 22 opinions and Mignault authoring 15. Mignault described this approach as the "purity of the Quebec law." In approaching these cases, Mignault focused on the language of the Civil Code and a linguistic analysis.

Mignault's judicial approach emphasized stare decisis, and he distrusted judge-made law, even within the context of the civil law of France permitting their judges to adapt the law to meet current social conditions. This resulted in a judicial approach that rejected creativity.
