= Eugène Lafleur =

Canadian lawyer and jurist (1856–1930)

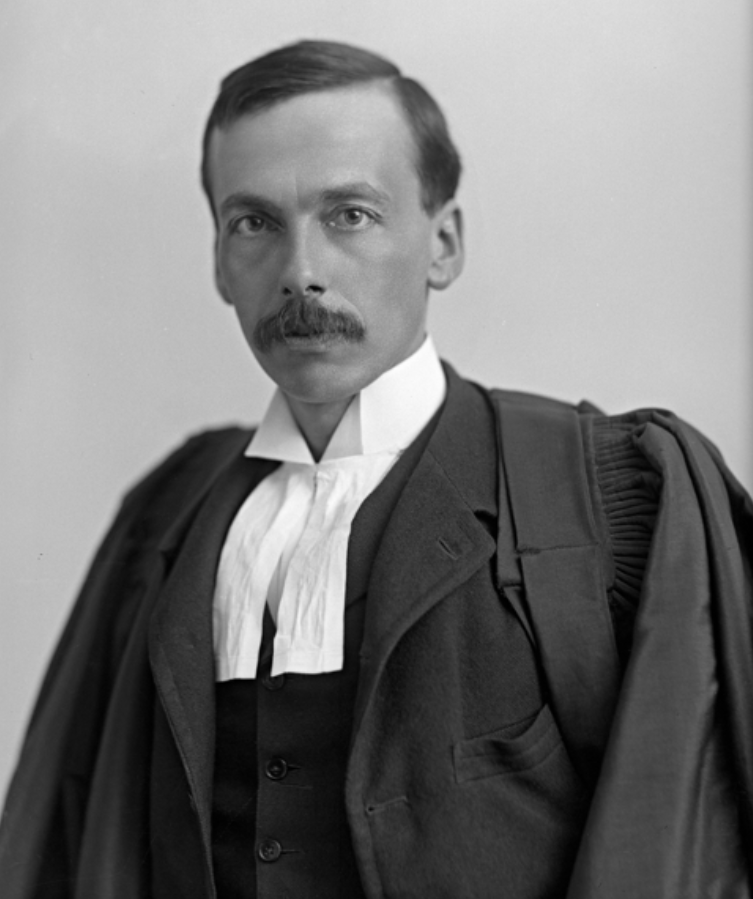
- Lafleur c. 1900
- Born: Eugène-Roussy Lafleur; April 12, 1856; Longueuil, Canada East
- Died: April 29, 1930 (aged 74); Ottawa, Ontario
- Resting place: Mount Royal Cemetery
- Education: McGill University (BA) (BCL)
- Occupations: Lawyer, teacher, author
- Spouse: Marie-Alice Voruz Lafleur
- Children: 4
- Parents: Theodore Lafleur (father); Adèle Henriette Elisabeth Voruz (mother)

Eugène Lafleur (April 12, 1856 – April 29, 1930) was a Canadian lawyer, teacher, and author from Quebec.

== Early life ==
Eugène Lafleur was born on 12 April 1856 in Longueuil, Lower Canada, the eldest son of Reverend Theodore Lafleur and Adèle Voruz. He was raised in an English-speaking Baptist household, but could speak French proficiently.

In 1870, Lafleur enrolled in the classical program at the High School of Montreal, and later attended McGill College, completing a Bachelor of Arts in 1877, and a Bachelor of Civil Law in 1880 in which he won the university's gold medal. He was called to the Quebec bar in 1881.

== Legal career ==
Lafleur articled with John Sprott Archibald, later a judge of the Court of Queen's Bench of Quebec, and worked in his office from 1881 to 1884. The following year he briefly joined the firm of Witherspoon, Lafleur and Heneker, and in 1885 founded the firm that would become McCarthy Tétrault. From 1887 to 1894 he maintained a solo practice, before forming the short-lived partnership of Lafleur and Rielle in Montreal.

Alongside his practice, Lafleur pursued an academic career. From 1889 to 1908 he taught civil law and international law at McGill University, resuming in 1912 as professor of public international law until his retirement in 1921. McGill awarded him an honorary LLD in October 1921, and he held the title of emeritus professor of law until 1929.

He was appointed Queen's Counsel in 1899. In 1911, he served as chairman of the Chamizal arbitration tribunal, established by the United States and Mexico to resolve a long-standing border dispute at El Paso, Texas, and Ciudad Juárez, Mexico, following a change in the course of the Rio Grande. Lafleur and his Mexican colleague ruled in favour of Mexico, with the American commissioner dissenting.

Lafleur was twice considered for high judicial office. In 1907, Prime Minister Wilfrid Laurier urged him to accept a seat on the Quebec Court of King's Bench, which he declined. In 1924, following the death of Chief Justice of Canada Louis Henry Davies, Prime Minister William Lyon Mackenzie King sought to appoint Lafleur as chief justice of Canada. King offered him the position both before and after Davies's death, but Lafleur declined, citing his age and the need for younger justices on the Court. King even asked Governor General Lord Byng to urge Lafleur to reconsider and delayed the appointment in the hope that he might change his mind. Historians Snell and Vaughn later observed that at the time Lafleur had practised for nearly forty-two years and was "quite likely the most eminent counsel in all of Canada."

== Personal life ==
On 16 March 1896, Lafleur married Marie-Alice Voruz in Geneva, Switzerland. The couple had four children.

Lafleur died unexpectedly in Ottawa on April 29, 1930, after contracting a heavy cold that developed into pneumonia. A funeral service was held at Christ Church Cathedral in Montreal, after which he was buried in Mount Royal Cemetery.
