= Second Supreme Court of Canada building =

Home to the Supreme Court of Canada from 1882 to 1945

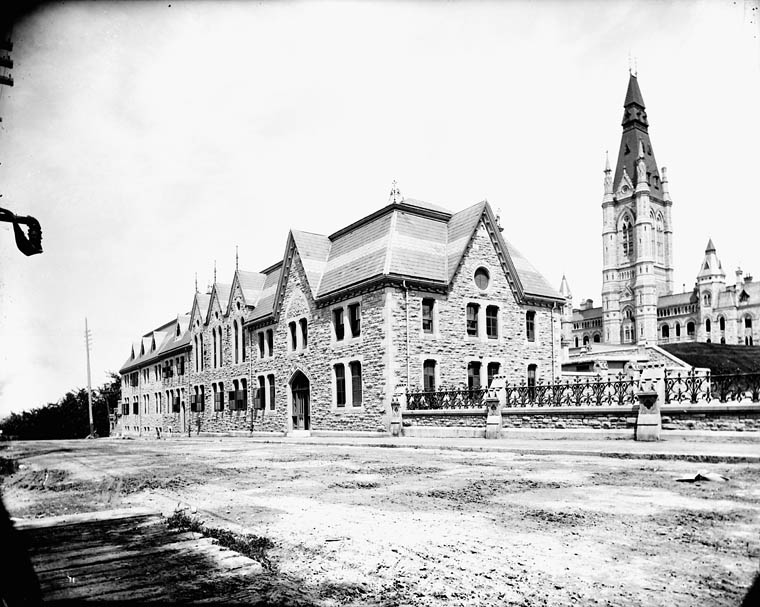
- The old Supreme Court building
- Interactive map of the Second Supreme Court of Canada building area

General information
- Architectural style: Gothic Revival
- Coordinates: 45.4227°N 75.7023°W
- Completed: 1874
- Renovated: 1882
- Demolished: 1956
- Owner: Government of Canada

Design and construction
- Architects: Thomas Seaton Scott renovated by Thomas Fuller

The Second Supreme Court of Canada building sat to the west of Parliament Hill in Ottawa and was home to the Supreme Court of Canada from 1882 to 1945. The building was demolished in 1955 and the area became a parking lot and vehicle screening facility for Parliament Hill.

== History ==
The second Supreme Court of Canada building was constructed in 1873–74 at the southwest corner of the West Block. It was designed by Chief Dominion Architect Thomas Seaton Scott as workshops and stables for the Department of Public Works to maintain buildings on Parliament Hill. Although similar in massing to the West and the East Blocks, the structure was a subdued modern Gothic Revival design and was considered less ornate than other federal buildings in Ottawa.

In 1875, the Supreme Court of Canada was established. The Court had no permanent home and sat in various committee rooms on Parliament Hill, including the Railway Committee Room.

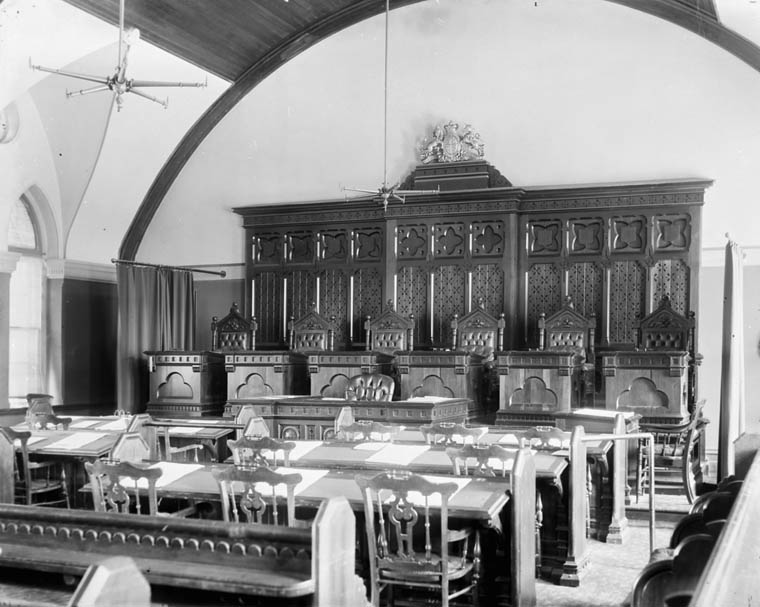
The interior of the Second Supreme Court of Canada building in 1890.

In 1881, Thomas Fuller renovated the workshop building for judicial use. In 1882, the Court moved into its new permanent quarters. From 1882 to 1887, the Court shared the premises with the National Art Gallery. The building quickly proved inadequate. Judges complained of a persistent "dreadful smell," poor ventilation, cramped quarters, insufficient offices, and the distance from the Library of Parliament. In 1890, a north wing was added, nearly doubling the building's size through the addition of a basement, two additional storeys, and an attic.

Throughout the early twentieth century, the Court repeatedly requested a purpose-built courthouse from the government. As Minister of Justice, David Mills and later Charles Fitzpatrick advocated for a new building. A competition was held to design two new buildings that would form a government complex East of Parliament Hill, one building for Department of Justice employees and another to house the Supreme Court and Exchequor Court. The plans for the complex fell apart due to difficulties in organizing the project and the decision to permit the construction of the Château Laurier Hotel.

Incremental improvements to the building followed: plumbing, shelving, lighting, and a one-storey library extension in 1906; renovations to lawyers' consulting rooms and attic office space in 1925 and 1927; and fire escapes in 1930. During the government of R. B. Bennett, officials began assessing potential sites and costs for a new building. Meaningful progress, occurred only after William Lyon Mackenzie King returned to office following the 1935 election.

The building was no longer adequate for the Court. A 1936 article in Maclean's observed: "The highest tribunal in our country. It awes one. Even the shoddy little [Supreme Court] building cannot rob the institution of that peculiar reverence one automatically feels." Later, a formal inspection recommended that the building be condemned. The report cited fire hazards, rotting structural decay, cramped quarters, and unsanitary conditions. It described the women's washroom as consisting of "one bowl placed in a dark corner underneath the stairway" and stated that it "should be condemned forthwith." The justices' offices were characterized as "thoroughly inadequate and injurious to the health of the occupants." Minister of Justice Ernest Lapointe recommended construction of a new courthouse. Prime Minister King supported the proposal, and the proposal was subsequently approved by Parliament.

The original plans for a new complex contemplated a three-building arrangement housing the Privy Council, the Supreme Court, and several commissions. Architect Ernest Cormier was retained and consulted with the Court and Chief Justice Lyman Duff. Construction began in 1938, and Queen Elizabeth the Queen Mother laid the cornerstone in May 1939.

The new building was completed in 1941 but was requisitioned for wartime government use. Finally, in January 1946, the Supreme Court moved into its current premises. However, the former building continued to be occupied by the Court until 1949.

== Post-Supreme Court use and demolition ==
After the Supreme Court relocated to its new building west of Parliament Hill, the former courthouse remained in use until 1949. The building was subsequently used as offices for the Government Economy Control, then for the Government Travel Bureau. In 1956, the Federal District Commission announced the building would be destroyed for the creation of a grand mall stretching from West Block to the Library and Archives Canada Building. Opposition leader John G. Diefenbaker and George Nowlan made speeches in Parliament calling on the government to protect the building, and Mayor Charlotte Whitton started a campaign to save the building. On September 11, 1956, the roof was removed from the building, and within the next several weeks the building was demolished.

The site of the second building is now used as a parking lot and vehicle screening facility for Parliament Hill.
