= Supreme Court of Canada =

Highest court of Canada

- Cour suprême du Canada
- The badge of the Supreme Court

- The flag of the Supreme Court (left) and the Cormier Emblem (right)
- Established: 8 April 1875; 151 years ago
- Jurisdiction: Canada
- Location: Ottawa, Ontario
- Composition method: Judicial appointments in Canada
- Authorized by: Constitution Act, 1867 and Supreme Court Act, 1875
- Judge term length: Mandatory retirement at age 75
- Number of positions: 9
- Website: www.scc-csc.ca

Chief Justice of Canada
- Currently: Richard Wagner
- Since: 18 December 2017
- Lead position ends: 2 April 2032

The Supreme Court of Canada (SCC; French: Cour suprême du Canada, CSC) is the highest court in the judicial system of Canada. It comprises nine justices, whose decisions are the ultimate application of Canadian law, and grants permission to between 40 and 75 litigants each year to appeal decisions rendered by provincial, territorial and federal appellate courts. The Supreme Court is bijural, hearing cases from two major legal traditions (common law and civil law) and bilingual, hearing cases in both official languages of Canada (English and French).

The effects of any judicial decision on the common law, on the interpretation of statutes, or on any other application of law, can, in effect, be nullified by legislation, unless the particular decision of the court in question involves application of the Canadian Constitution, in which case, the decision (in most cases) is completely binding on the legislative branch. This is especially true of decisions which touch upon the Canadian Charter of Rights and Freedoms, which cannot be altered by the legislative branch unless the decision is overridden pursuant to section 33 (the "notwithstanding clause").

== History ==
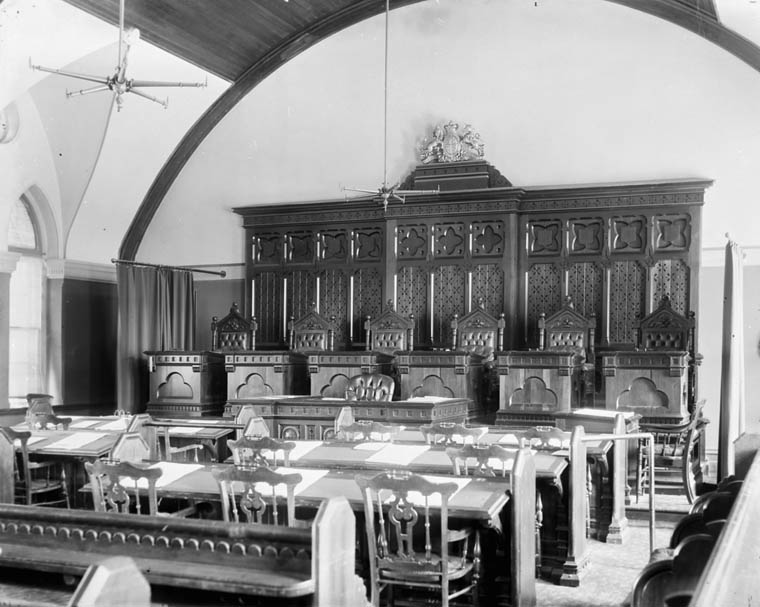
Courtroom inside the Second Supreme Court of Canada building in April 1890

The authority to establish a national appeal court dated back to the creation of the Province of Canada in 1840, but the power remained unused. When the British North America Act, 1867, (Note: In 1982, the British North America Act, 1867 was renamed the Constitution Act, 1867.) was finalized, section 101 provided Parliament may create a general court of appeal. (Note: Constitution Act, 1867 (UK), 30 & 31 Vict, c 3, s 101, reprinted in RSC 1985, Appendix II, No 5.) Prime Minister John A. Macdonald introduced two bills to establish the supreme court in 1869 and 1870, however, both were withdrawn. (Note: Bill 80: An Act to Establish a Supreme Court for the Dominion of Canada, 2nd Session, 1st Parliament, 1869.) (Note: Bill 48: An Act to establish a Supreme Court for Canada, 3rd Session, 1st Parliament, 1870.)

During the 1874 federal election, Alexander Mackenzie's Liberals included the creation of a central court of appeal as part of their campaign platform. Minister of Justice Télésphore Fournier introduced The Supreme and Exchequer Court Act, which passed on April 8, 1875, with bipartisan support. The Act simultaneously established both the Supreme Court and the Exchequer Court. (Note: The Supreme and Exchequer Court Act, S.C. 1875, c. 11 (The Supreme and Exchequer Court Act at Canadiana))

However, prior to 1949, the Supreme Court did not constitute the court of last resort as litigants could appeal the Court's decisions to the Judicial Committee of the Privy Council in London. Some cases could bypass the Supreme Court and go directly to the Judicial Committee from the provincial courts of appeal. The Supreme Court formally became the court of last resort for criminal appeals in 1933 (Note: Criminal Code Amendment Act, S.C. 1932–33, c. 53, s. 17) and for all other appeals in 1949. (Note: An Act to Amend the Supreme Court Act, S.C. 1949, c. 37) Cases that were begun prior to those dates remained appealable to the Judicial Committee, and the last case on appeal from the Supreme Court was not decided until 1959. (Note: Ponoka-Calmar Oils Ltd. and another v Earl F. Wakefield Co. And others [1959] UKPC 20, [1960] AC 18, 1959 CanLII 427 (7 October 1959), P.C. (on appeal from Canada))

The increase in the importance of the Supreme Court was mirrored by the numbers of its members. When the Court was established in 1875, it operated with a panel of six judges, with a quorum of four. This meant if there was an equal division (3–3), the appeal would be dismissed. In 1927, Parliament amended the Supreme Court Act to add a seventh position on the Court and to establish a mandatory retirement age of 75. (Note: An Act to amend the Supreme Court Act, S.C. 1927, c. 38 (An Act to amend the Supreme Court Act at Archive.org)) In 1949, the bench reached its current composition of nine justices.

Prior to 1949, most of the appointees to the Supreme Court owed their position to political patronage. Each judge had strong ties to the party in power at the time of their appointment. In 1973, the appointment of a constitutional law professor Bora Laskin as chief justice represented a major turning point for the court. Laskin's federalist and liberal views were shared by Prime Minister Pierre Trudeau, who recommended Laskin's appointment to the Supreme Court, but from that appointment onward appointees increasingly either came from academic backgrounds or were well-respected practitioners with several years' experience in appellate courts.

The Constitution Act, 1982, greatly expanded the role of the Supreme Court in Canadian society by the addition of the Canadian Charter of Rights and Freedoms, which greatly broadened the scope of judicial review. The evolution from the court under Chief Justice Brian Dickson (1984–1990) through to that of Antonio Lamer (1990–2000) witnessed a continuing vigour in the protection of civil liberties. Lamer's criminal law background proved an influence on the number of criminal cases heard by the Court during his time as chief justice. Nonetheless, the Lamer court was more conservative with Charter rights, with only about a 1% success rate for Charter claimants.

Lamer was succeeded as the chief justice by Beverley McLachlin in January 2000. She was the first woman to hold that position. McLachlin's appointment resulted in a more centrist and unified court. Dissenting and concurring reasons were fewer than during the Dickson and Lamer courts. With the 2005 appointments of puisne justices Louise Charron and Rosalie Abella, the Supreme Court became the world's most gender-balanced national high court with four of its nine members being female. Justice Marie Deschamps's retirement on 7 August 2012 caused the number to fall to three; however, the appointment of Suzanne Côté on 1 December 2014 restored the number to four. The appointment of Mary T. Moreau on 6 November 2023 created the first female-majority in the history of the Court. After serving on the court for 28 years, 259 days (17 years, 341 days as chief justice), McLachlin retired in December 2017. Her successor as the chief justice is Richard Wagner.

Along with the German Federal Constitutional Court and the European Court of Human Rights, the Supreme Court of Canada is among the most frequently cited courts in the world.

== Canadian judiciary ==
The structure of the Canadian court system is pyramidal, a broad base being formed by the various provincial and territorial courts whose judges are appointed by the provincial or territorial governments. At the next level are the provincial and territorial superior trial courts, where judges are appointed by the federal government. Judgments from the superior courts may be appealed to a still higher level, the provincial or territorial superior courts of appeal.

Several federal courts also exist: the Tax Court, the Federal Court, the Federal Court of Appeal, and the Court Martial Appeal Court. Unlike the provincial superior courts, which exercise inherent or general jurisdiction, the jurisdiction of federal courts and provincially appointed provincial courts are limited by statute. In all, there are over 1,000 federally appointed judges at various levels across Canada.

=== Appellate process ===
The Supreme Court rests at the apex of the judicial pyramid. This institution hears appeals from the provincial courts of last resort, usually the provincial or territorial courts of appeal, and the Federal Court of Appeal. In some matters appeals come straight from the trial courts, as in the case of publication bans and other orders that are otherwise not appealable.

In most cases, permission to appeal must first be obtained from the court. Motions for leave to appeal to the court are generally heard by a panel of three of its judges and a simple majority is determinative. By convention, this panel never explains why it grants or refuses leave in any particular case, but the court typically hears cases of national importance or where the case allows it to settle an important issue of law. Leave is rarely granted, meaning that for most litigants, provincial courts of appeal are courts of last resort. But leave to appeal is not required for some cases, primarily indictable criminal cases in which at least one appellate judge (on the relevant provincial court of appeal) dissented on a point of law, and appeals from provincial reference cases.

A final source of cases is the power of the federal government to submit reference cases. In such cases, the Supreme Court is required to give an opinion on questions referred to it by the Governor in Council (the Cabinet). However, in many cases, including the most recent same-sex marriage reference, the Supreme Court has declined to answer a question from the Cabinet. In that case, the court said it would not decide if same-sex marriages were required by the Charter of Rights and Freedoms, because the government had announced it would change the law regardless of its opinion, and subsequently did.

=== Constitutional interpretation ===
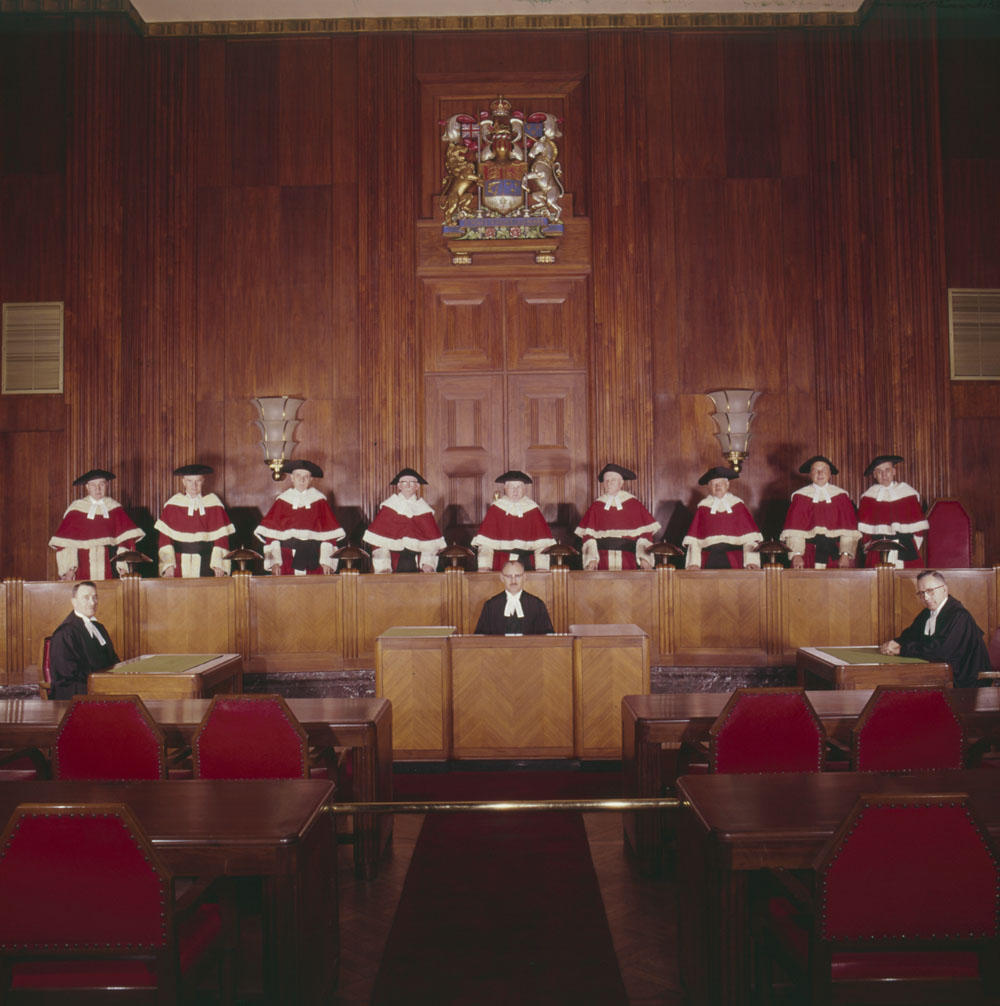
The justices of the Supreme Court of Canada in 1961

The Supreme Court thus performs a unique function. It can be asked by the Governor-in-Council to hear references considering important questions of law. Such referrals may concern the constitutionality or interpretation of federal or provincial legislation, or the division of powers between federal and provincial spheres of government. Any point of law may be referred in this manner. However, the Court is not often called upon to hear references. References have been used to re-examine criminal convictions that have concerned the country as in the cases of David Milgaard and Steven Truscott.

The Supreme Court has the ultimate power of judicial review over Canadian federal and provincial laws' constitutional validity. If a federal or provincial law has been held contrary to the division of power provisions of one of the various constitution acts, the legislature or parliament must either live with the result, amend the law so that it complies, or obtain an amendment to the constitution. If a law is declared contrary to certain sections of the Charter of Rights and Freedoms, Parliament or the provincial legislatures may make that particular law temporarily valid again against by using the "override power" of the notwithstanding clause. In one case, the Quebec National Assembly invoked this power to override a Supreme Court decision (Ford v Quebec (AG)) that held that one of Quebec's language laws banning the display of English commercial signs was inconsistent with the Charter. Saskatchewan has also used it to uphold its labour laws. This override power can be exercised for five years, after which time the override must be renewed or the decision comes into force.

In some cases, the court may stay the effect of its judgments so that unconstitutional laws continue in force for a period of time. Usually, this is done to give Parliament or a legislature sufficient time to enact a new replacement scheme of legislation. For example, in Reference Re Manitoba Language Rights, the court struck down Manitoba's laws because they were not enacted in the French language, as required by the Constitution. However, the Court stayed its judgment for five years to give Manitoba time to re-enact all its legislation in French. It turned out five years was insufficient so the court was asked, and agreed, to give more time.

Constitutional questions may, of course, also be raised in the normal case of appeals involving individual litigants, governments, government agencies or Crown corporations. In such cases the federal and provincial governments must be notified of any constitutional questions and may intervene to submit a brief and attend oral argument at the court. Usually the other governments are given the right to argue their case in the court, although on rare occasions this has been curtailed and prevented by order of one of the court's judges.

== Sessions ==
The Supreme Court sits in three sessions in each calendar year. The first session begins on the fourth Tuesday in January, the second session on the fourth Tuesday in April, and the third session on the first Tuesday in October. The Court determines how long each session will be. Hearings only take place in Ottawa, although litigants can present oral arguments from remote locations by means of a video-conference system. Hearings are open to the public. Most hearings are taped for delayed telecast in both of Canada's official languages. When in session, the court sits Monday to Friday, hearing two appeals a day. A quorum consists of five members for appeals, but a panel of nine justices hears most cases. (Note: Supreme Court Act, R.S.C. 1985, c. S-26, s. 25 (Supreme Court Act at CanLII))

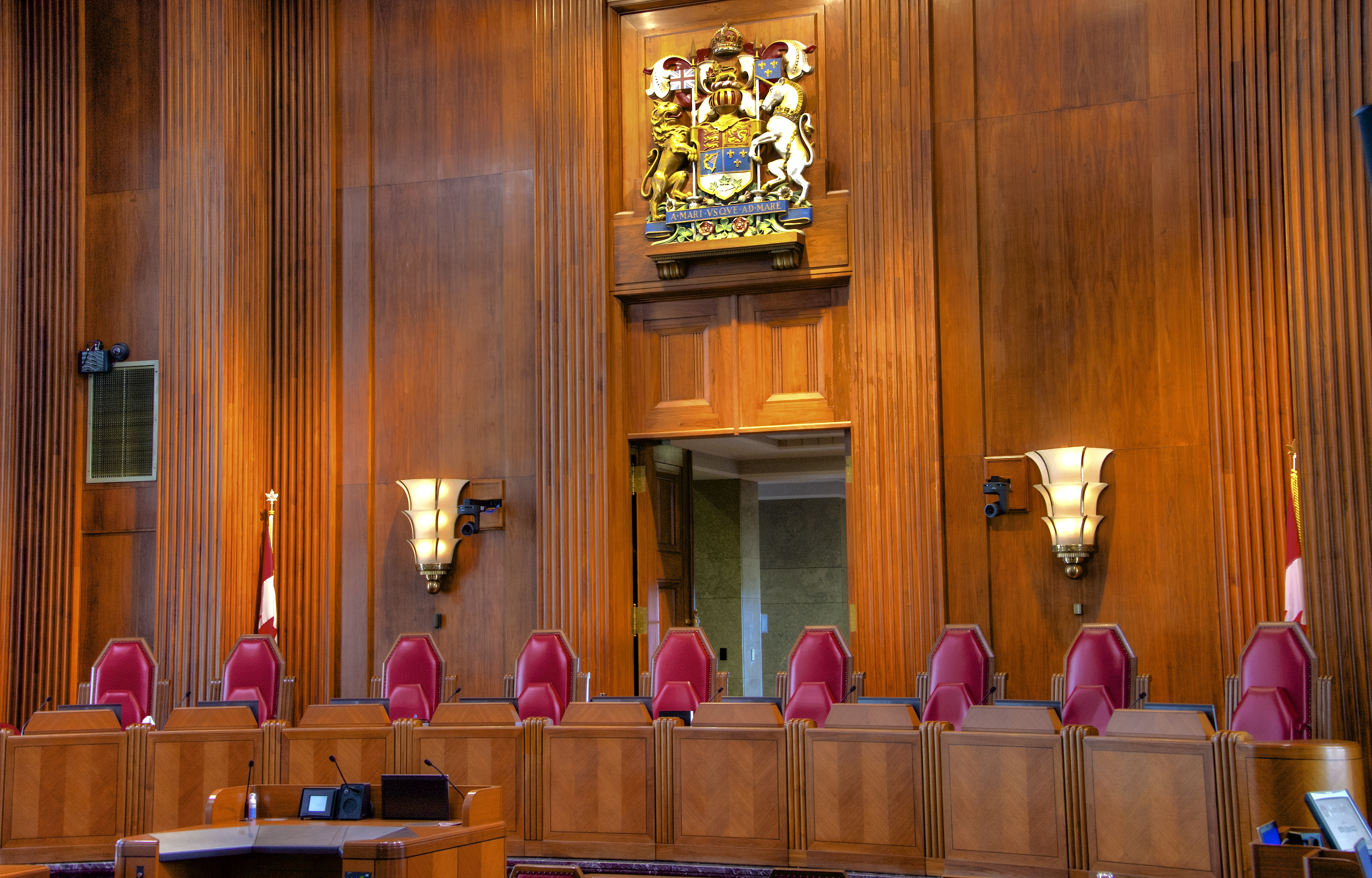
Courtroom seats used by the justices of the Supreme Court of Canada

On the bench, the chief justice of Canada or, in his or her absence, the senior puisne justice, presides from the center chair with the other justices seated to his or her right and left by order of seniority of appointment. At sittings, the justices usually appear in black silk robes but they wear their ceremonial robes of bright scarlet trimmed with Canadian white mink in court on special occasions and in the Senate at the opening of each new session of Parliament.

Counsel appearing before the court may use either English or French. The judges can also use either English or French. There is simultaneous translation available to the judges, counsel and to members of the public who are in the audience, or watching by livestream.

The decision of the court is sometimes rendered orally at the conclusion of the hearing. In these cases, the court may simply refer to the decision of the court below to explain its own reasons. In other cases, the court may announce its decision at the conclusion of the hearing, with reasons to follow. (Note: R v Beare; R v Higgins, 1988 CanLII 126 at para 19, [1988] 2 SCR 387) (Note: Consortium Developments (Clearwater) Ltd. v Sarnia (City), 1998 CanLII 762 at para 1, [1998] 3 SCR 3) (Note: Rothmans, Benson & Hedges Inc. v Saskatchewan, 2005 SCC 13 at para 1, [2005] 1 SCR 188) As well, in some cases, the court may not call on counsel for the respondent, if it has not been convinced by the arguments of counsel for the appellant. (Note: Whitbread v Walley, 1990 CanLII 33 at para 2, [1990] 3 SCR 1273) In very rare cases, the court may not call on counsel for the appellant and instead calls directly on counsel for the respondent. (Note: Rothmans, Benson & Hedges Inc. v Saskatchewan, 2005 SCC 13, [2005] 1 SCR 188) However, in most cases, the court hears from all counsel and then reserves judgment to enable the justices to write considered reasons. Decisions of the court need not be unanimous – a majority may decide, with dissenting reasons given by the minority. Justices may write separate or joint reasons for any case.

== Judgments ==
=== Number of judgments per year ===
The number of judgments issued annually by the Supreme Court has declined over the past 65 years. In 1970, the starting point for the Supreme Court's online publication of its decisions, the court under Chief Justice Fauteux issued 102 decisions. In 1974, the first full year under Chief Justice Laskin, the court issued 114 judgments. In 1985, the first full year under Chief Justice Dickson, the number was 84, while in 1991, the first full year under Chief Justice Lamer, the number was 109. In 2000, Chief Justice McLachlin's first year, the number was 69. Under Chief Justice Wagner, the number has declined further, with the lowest number of judgments being 34 in 2024.

=== Judgments issued, 2006 to 2026 ===
Number of Supreme Court judgments
Year	Judgments per Year, 2006 to 2026	Chief Justice
2026 (in progress)	23	Wagner
2025	44	Wagner
2024	43	Wagner
2023	34	Wagner
2022	54	Wagner
2021	54	Wagner
2020	45	Wagner
2019	67	Wagner
2018	59	Wagner
2017	64	McLachlin
2016	56	McLachlin
2015	66	McLachlin
2014	77	McLachlin
2013	73	McLachlin
2012	75	McLachlin
2011	66	McLachlin
2010	67	McLachlin
2009	62	McLachlin
2008	72	McLachlin
2007	54	McLachlin
2006	59	McLachlin
Source: Supreme Court Judgments, 2006 to 2026

=== Language of the judgments ===
Since 1970 and the introduction of the Official Languages Act, all judgments of the Court are fully bilingual, released in both official languages. Prior to 1970, the decisions were written in the language of the individual judges. If only one judge wrote a decision, it would be in the language chosen by that judge. If more than one judge wrote reasons in a case, there could be a mixture of English and French reasons. In July 2025, the Court announced that it will begin the process of translating the 6,000 judgments which were rendered prior to 1970, so that eventually the entire set of the Court's reasons will be bilingual. The translation will begin with a list of 25 judgments selected by an advisory panel as some of the most significant cases.

== Appointment of justices ==
Justices of the Supreme Court of Canada are appointed by the governor general on the advice of the prime minister.

Eligibility requirements for appointment to the Court are provided under the Supreme Court Act, which requires that appointees be judges of a superior court or members of the bar for ten or more years. Members of the bar or superior judiciary of Quebec, by law, must hold three of the nine positions on the Supreme Court of Canada. (Note: Supreme Court Act, R.S.C. 1985, c. S-26, s. 6 (Supreme Court Act at CanLII)) This is justified on the basis that Quebec uses civil law, rather than common law, as in the rest of the country. As explained in the reasons in Reference Re Supreme Court Act, ss. 5 and 6, sitting judges of the Federal Court and Federal Court of Appeal cannot be appointed to any of Quebec's three seats. By convention, the remaining six positions are divided in the following manner: three from Ontario, two from the western provinces and one from the Atlantic provinces. Parliament and the provincial governments have no constitutional role in such appointments, sometimes a point of contention.

In 2006, an interview phase by an ad hoc committee of members of Parliament was added. Justice Marshall Rothstein became the first justice to undergo the new process. The prime minister still has the final say on who becomes the candidate that is recommended to the governor general for appointment to the court. The government proposed an interview phase again in 2008, but a general election and minority parliament intervened with delays such that the Prime Minister recommended Justice Cromwell after consulting the leader of the Opposition.

As of August 2016, Prime Minister Justin Trudeau opened the process of application to change from the above-noted appointment process. Under the revised process, "[any] Canadian lawyer or judge who fits specified criteria can apply for a seat on the Supreme Court, through the Office of the Commissioner for Federal Judicial Affairs." Functional bilingualism is now a requirement.

Justices were originally allowed to remain on the bench for life, but in 1927 a mandatory retirement age of 75 was instituted. They may choose to retire earlier, but can only be removed involuntarily before that age by a vote of the Senate and House of Commons. (Note: An Act to amend the Supreme Court Act, S.C. 1927, c. 38, s. 2 (An Act to amend the Supreme Court Act at Archive.org)) (Note: Supreme Court Act, R.S.C. 1985, c. S-26, s. 9 (Supreme Court Act at CanLII))

When a judge leaves the Court, either at age 75 or by resigning earlier, the Supreme Court Act provides that they can participate in cases that they heard before leaving, for up to six months after the date of their retirement or resignation. Some judges use this period to finish up work in progress on reserved judgments, while other judges simply leave and do not participate in reserved judgments. For example, Justices Major and Arbour did not participate in judgments on reserve; Justices L'Heureux-Dubé and Gonthier participated in most, but not all of the reserved judgments; and Justice Iacobucci worked on some judgments, but not for the full six month period.

A puisne justice of the Supreme Court is referred to as The Honourable Mr/Madam Justice and the chief justice as Right Honourable. At one time, judges were addressed as "My Lord" or "My Lady" during sessions of the court, but it has since discouraged this style of address and has directed lawyers to use the simpler "Justice", "Mr Justice" or "Madam Justice". The designation "My Lord/My Lady" continues in many provincial superior courts and in the Federal Court of Canada and Federal Court of Appeal, where it is optional.

Every four years, the Judicial Compensation and Benefits Commission makes recommendations to the federal government about the salaries for federally appointed judges, including the judges of the Supreme Court. That recommendation is not legally binding on the federal government, but the federal government is generally required to comply with the recommendation unless there is a very good reason to not do so. (Note: Provincial Court Judges' Assn. of New Brunswick v New Brunswick (Minister of Justice); Ontario Judges' Assn. v Ontario (Management Board); Bodner v Alberta; Conférence des juges du Québec v Quebec (Attorney General); Minc v Quebec (Attorney General), 2005 SCC 44 at para 21, [2005] 2 SCR 286, Supreme Court (Canada)) The chief justice receives $370,300 while the puisne justices receive $342,800 annually. (Note: Judges Act, R.S.C. 1985, c. J-1, s. 9)

== Current members ==
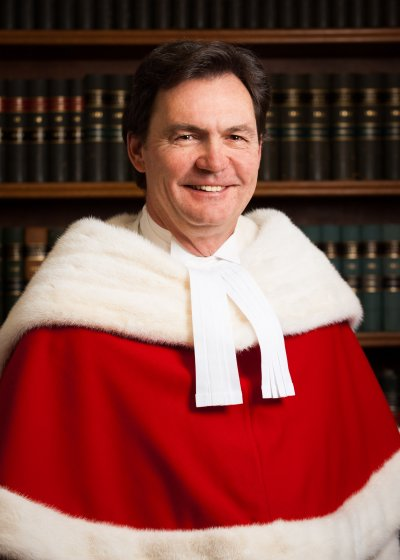
Richard Wagner, the current chief justice (since 2017)

The current chief justice of Canada is Richard Wagner. He was appointed to the court as a puisne judge on 5 October 2012 and appointed chief justice, 18 December 2017. The eight current justices of the Supreme Court are:

Justice				Nominated by	Date appointed	Retirement date	Law school	Prior office
OP	Name (Province)	Birthdate	Birthplace	Nominated by	Date appointed	Retirement date	Law school	Prior office
1st	Richard Wagner (Quebec)	2 April 1957 (age 69)	Canada (Quebec)	Harper; J. Trudeau (Note: As chief justice)	5 October 2012; 18 December 2017	2 April 2032	Faculté de droit, Université d'Ottawa (LLL)	Quebec Court of Appeal; Superior Court of Quebec
2nd	Andromache Karakatsanis (Ontario)	3 October 1955 (age 71)	Canada (Ontario)	Harper	21 October 2011	3 October 2030	Osgoode Hall Law School (LLB)	Court of Appeal for Ontario; Ontario Superior Court of Justice
3rd	Suzanne Côté (Quebec)	21 September 1958 (age 68)	Canada (Quebec)	Harper	1 December 2014	21 September 2033	Université Laval (LLB)	Partner at Osler, Hoskin & Harcourt
4th	Malcolm Rowe (Newfoundland and Labrador)	27 June 1953 (age 73)	Canada (Newfoundland and Labrador)	J. Trudeau	28 October 2016	27 June 2028	Osgoode Hall Law School (LLB)	Court of Appeal of Newfoundland and Labrador; Supreme Court of Newfoundland and Labrador
5th	Nicholas Kasirer (Quebec)	20 February 1960 (age 66)	Canada (Quebec)	J. Trudeau	16 September 2019	20 February 2035	McGill University (LLB, BCL); University of Paris 1 Pantheon-Sorbonne (DEA)	Quebec Court of Appeal
6th	Mahmud Jamal (Ontario)	20 July 1967 (age 59)	Kenya (Nairobi)	J. Trudeau	1 July 2021	20 July 2042	McGill University (LLB, BCL); Yale University (LLM)	Court of Appeal for Ontario
7th	Michelle O'Bonsawin (Ontario)	2 May 1974 (age 52)	Canada (Ontario)	J. Trudeau	1 September 2022	2 May 2049	University of Ottawa (LLB, PhD); Osgoode Hall Law School (LLM)	Ontario Superior Court of Justice
8th	Mary Moreau (Alberta)	1955 or 1956 (age 67–68)	Canada (Alberta)	J. Trudeau	6 November 2023	2030–2031	University of Alberta (LLB); Université de Sherbrooke (Civil Law certification)	Court of King's Bench of Alberta
9th	Glenn Joyal (Manitoba)	1959 or 1960 (age 66)	Canada (Manitoba)	Carney	30 June 2026	2034–2035	McGill University (LLB)	Court of King's Bench of Manitoba

=== Length of tenure ===
The following graphical timeline depicts the length of each current justice's tenure on the Supreme Court (not their position in the court's order of precedence) as of 6 November 2026.

Andromache Karakatsanis has had the longest tenure of any of the current members of the court, having been appointed in October 2011. Richard Wagner's cumulative tenure is 14 years, 32 days—5 years, 74 days as puisne justice, and 8 years, 323 days as chief justice. Glenn Joyal has the briefest tenure, having been appointed 114 days ago. The length of tenure for the other justices are: Suzanne Côté, 11 years, 340 days; Malcom Rowe, 10 years, 9 days; Nicholas Kasirer, 7 years, 51 days; Mahmud Jamal, 5 years, 128 days; Michelle O'Bonsawin, 4 years, 66 days; and Mary Moreau 3 years, 0 days.

== Rules of the court ==
The Rules of the Supreme Court of Canada are located on the Justice Laws Website, as well as in the Canada Gazette, as SOR/2002-216 (plus amendments), made pursuant to subsection 97(1) of the Supreme Court Act. Fees and taxes are stipulated near the end.

== Law clerks ==
Since 1967, the court has hired law clerks to assist in legal research. Between 1967 and 1982, each puisne justice was assisted by one law clerk and the chief justice had two. From 1982, the number was increased to two law clerks for each justice. Currently, each justice has up to three law clerks.

== Ceremonial robes ==
Justices previously wore ceremonial robes of bright scarlet wool trimmed with Canadian white mink in court on special occasions and in the Senate at the opening of each new session of Parliament. In October 2025, the new ceremonial robe for justices was unveiled. The fur-free ceremonial robes are made of black silk with red piping.

== Building ==
Exterior of the Supreme Court of Canada building

The Supreme Court of Canada Building (French: édifice de la Cour suprême du Canada) is located just west of Parliament Hill, at 301 Wellington Street. It is situated on a bluff high above the Ottawa River in downtown Ottawa and is home to the Supreme Court of Canada. It also contains two courtrooms used by the Federal Court and the Federal Court of Appeal.

The building was designed by Ernest Cormier and is known for its Art Deco style—including two candelabrum-style fluted metal lamp standards that flank the entrance and the marble walls and floors of the lobby—contrasting with the châteauesque roof. Construction began in 1939, with the cornerstone laid by Queen Elizabeth, consort of King George VI and later known as the Queen Mother. In her speech, she said, "perhaps it is not inappropriate that this task should be performed by a woman; for woman's position in a civilized society has depended upon the growth of law." The court began hearing cases in the new building by January 1946.

In 2000, the edifice was named by the Royal Architectural Institute of Canada as one of the top 500 buildings produced in Canada during the last millennium. Canada Post issued a commemorative stamp on 9 June 2011, as part of the Architecture Art Déco series.

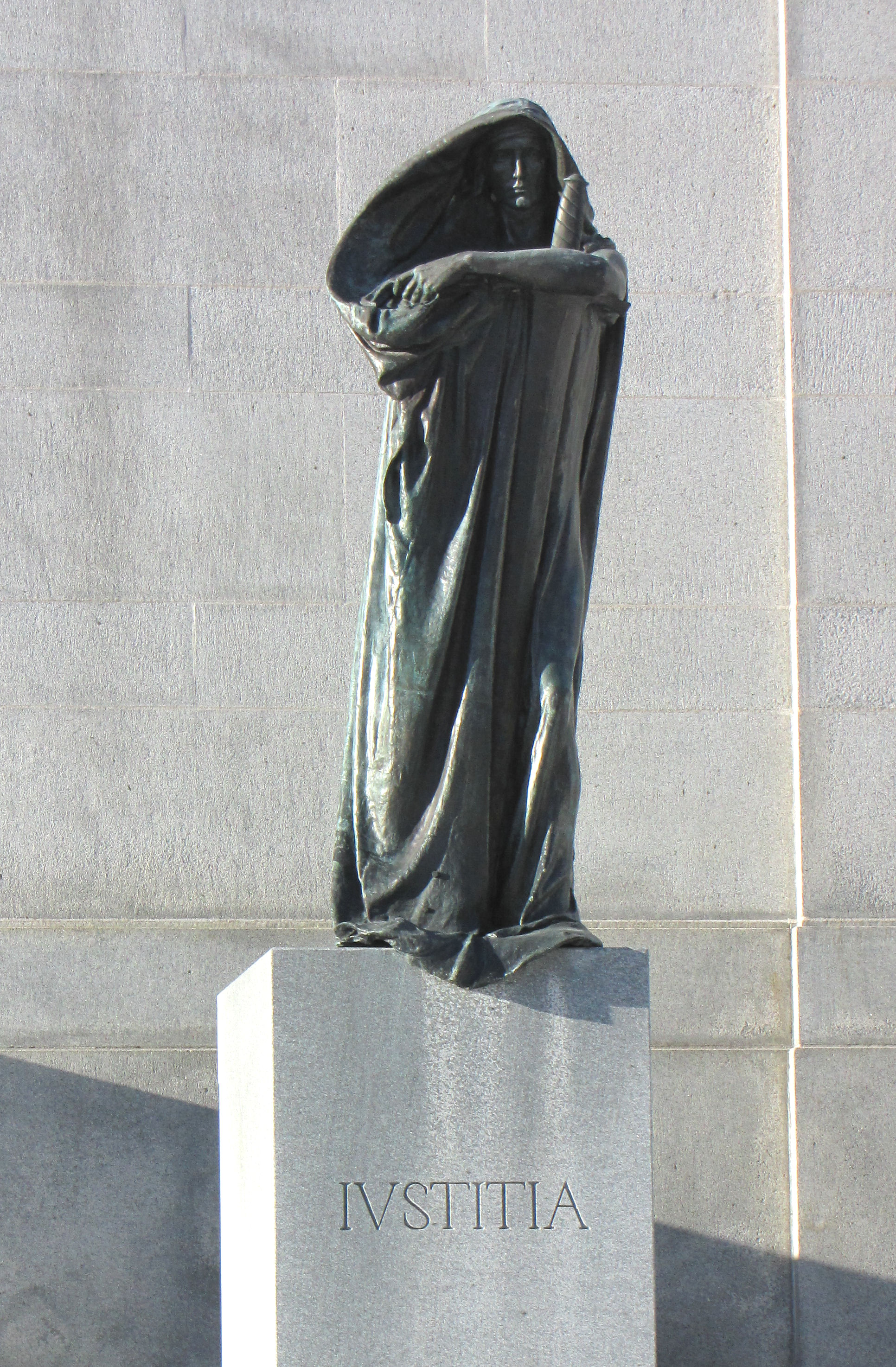
Statue of Justitia

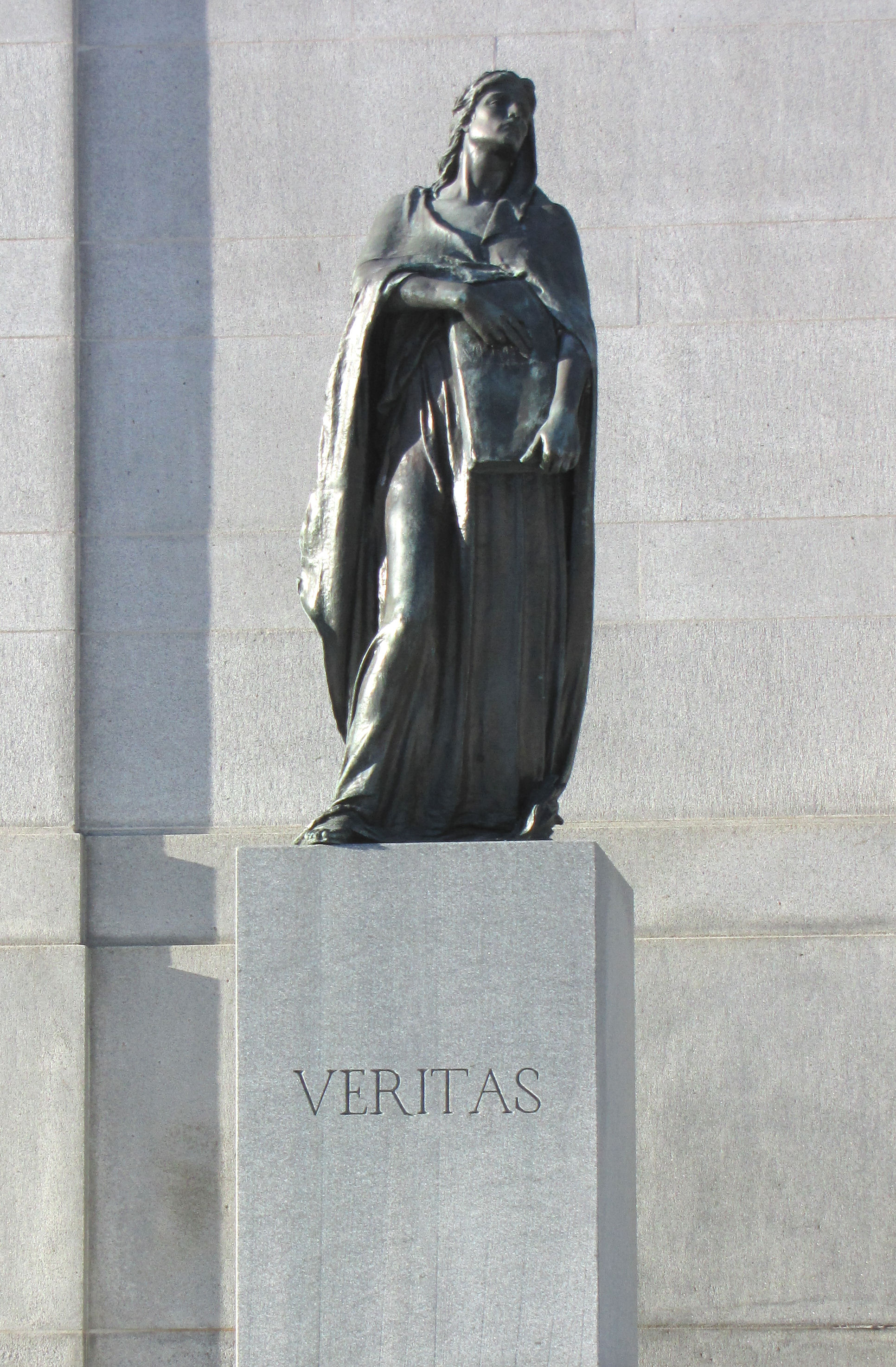
Statue of Veritas

Two statues sculpted by Walter Allward are located on the grounds of the Supreme Court building.

Two flagstaffs have been erected in front of the building. A flag on one is flown daily, while the other is hoisted only on those days when the court is in session. Also located on the grounds are several statues, including one of Prime Minister Louis St. Laurent, by Elek Imredy in 1976, and two—Veritas (Truth) and Justitia (Justice)—by Canadian sculptor Walter S. Allward. Inside there are busts of several chief justices: John Robert Cartwright (1967–1970), Bora Laskin (1973–1983), Brian Dickson (1984–1990), and Antonio Lamer (1990–2000), all sculpted by Kenneth Phillips Jarvis, a retired Under Treasurer of the Law Society of Upper Canada.

The court was previously housed in the Railway Committee Room and a number of other committee rooms in the Centre Block on Parliament Hill. The court then sat in the Old Supreme Court building on Bank Street, between 1889 and 1945. That structure was demolished in 1955 and the site used as parking for Parliament Hill.

Supreme Court of Canada signage on the West Memorial Building

Starting in fall 2026 the court will be housed temporarily in the West Memorial Building.

== See also ==
- Supreme Court of Canada cases
- List of supreme courts by country
