= Cormier House =

House in Montreal, Quebec, Canada

Coordinates: 45°30′01″N 73°35′07″W

- Maison Ernest-Cormier
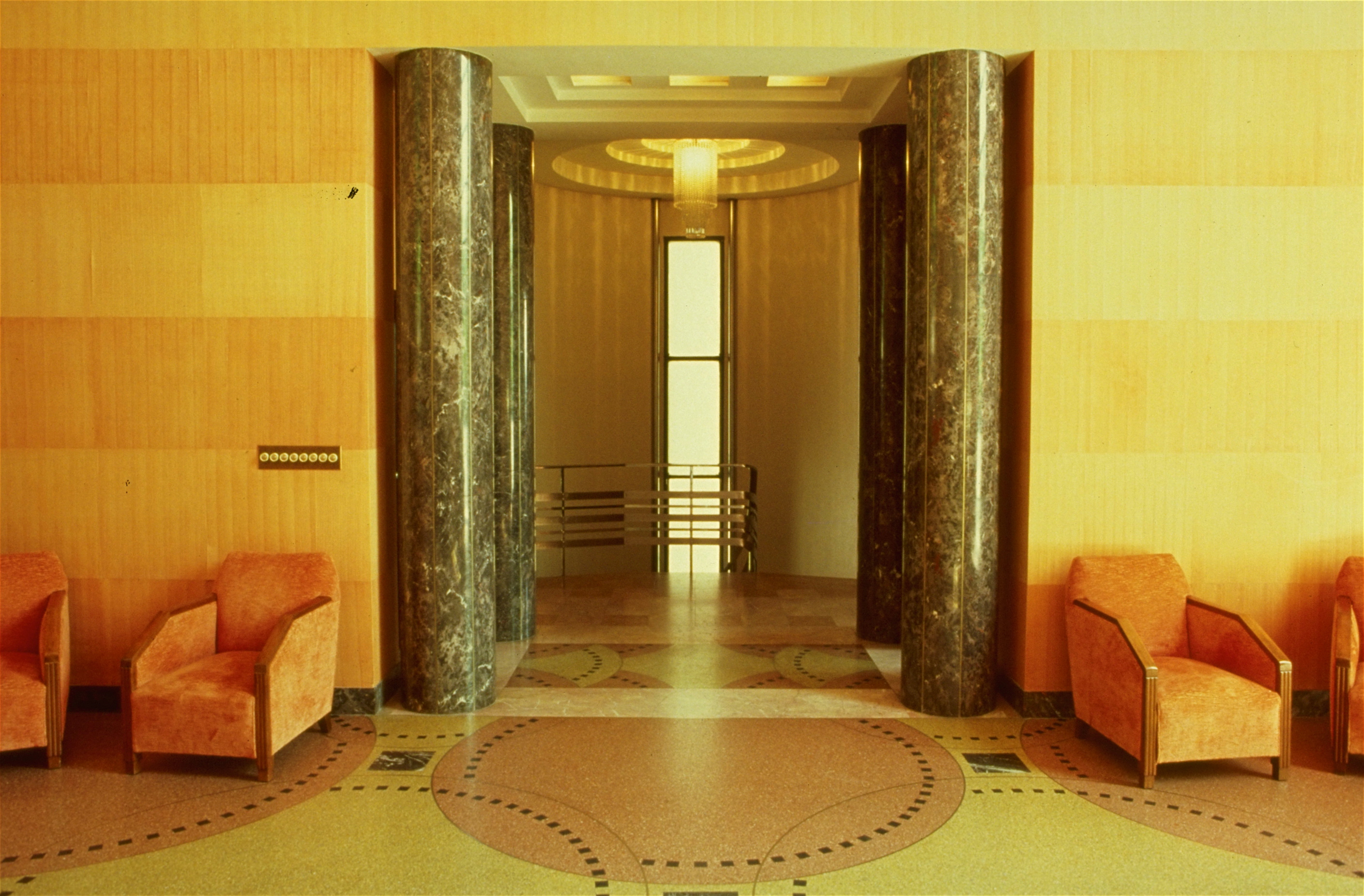
- Interactive map of the Cormier House area

General information
- Type: House
- Architectural style: Art Deco
- Location: Golden Square Mile, 1418 Pine Avenue West; Montreal, Quebec
- Construction started: 1930–31
- Renovated: 1982–83

Design and construction
- Architect: Ernest Cormier

Cormier House (French: Maison Ernest-Cormier) is an Art Deco residence located at 1418 Pine Avenue West in the Golden Square Mile area of Montreal, Quebec, Canada.

== Ownership ==
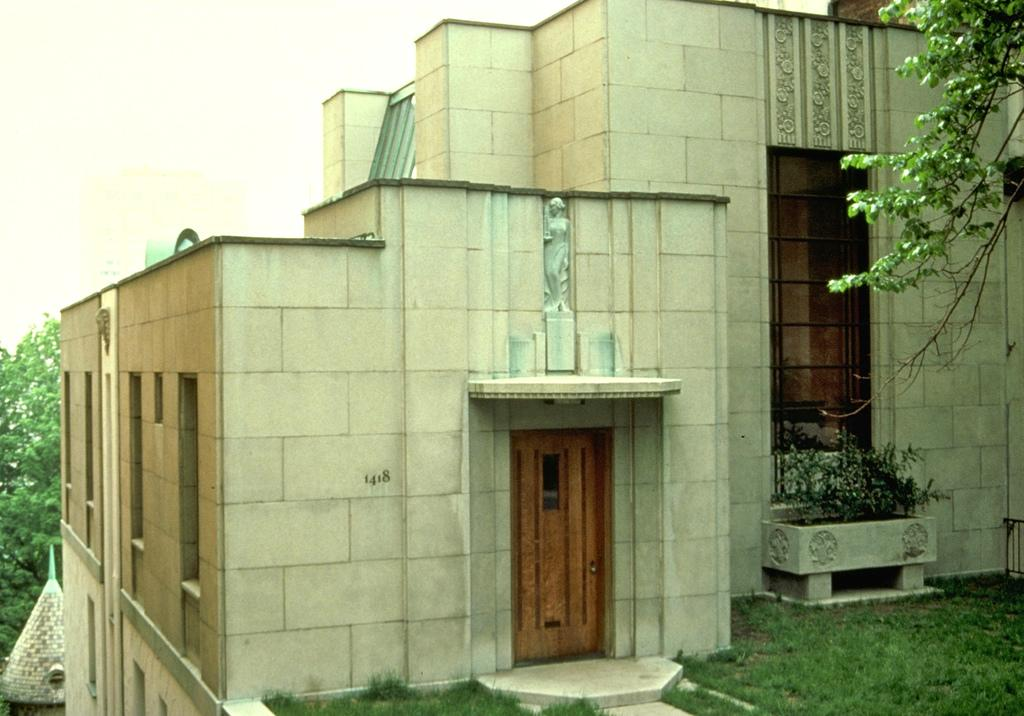
Exterior of Cormier House

It was built by architect Ernest Cormier in 1930–31 as his own residence. In 1974, the building was designated as a historical monument in Quebec.

In 1979, the property was bought by the 15th Canadian prime minister, Pierre Trudeau, for $230,000. It served as his home from his retirement from politics in the summer of 1984 until his death in 2000. It has been owned since 2000 by his son Alexandre, younger brother of former Canadian prime minister, Justin Trudeau.

== Description ==
Cormier experimented with a variety of styles in the house: Art Deco on the facade, monumental on one side, and more modernist in the back. Cormier created most of the furniture, with remaining pieces acquired at the 1925 Exposition Internationale des Arts Décoratifs et Industriels Modernes in Paris.

== Recognition ==
Cormier House has been designated as a historic property under Quebec's heritage legislation, the Loi sur les biens culturels. The house appeared on a stamp issued by Canada Post in 2011.

In 2018, the Ernest Cormier House was designated a National Historic Site, and Ernest Cormier was named a National Historic Person.
