= St. John the Baptist Church (Pawtucket, Rhode Island) =

Historic church in Rhode Island, United States

- U.S. National Register of Historic Places
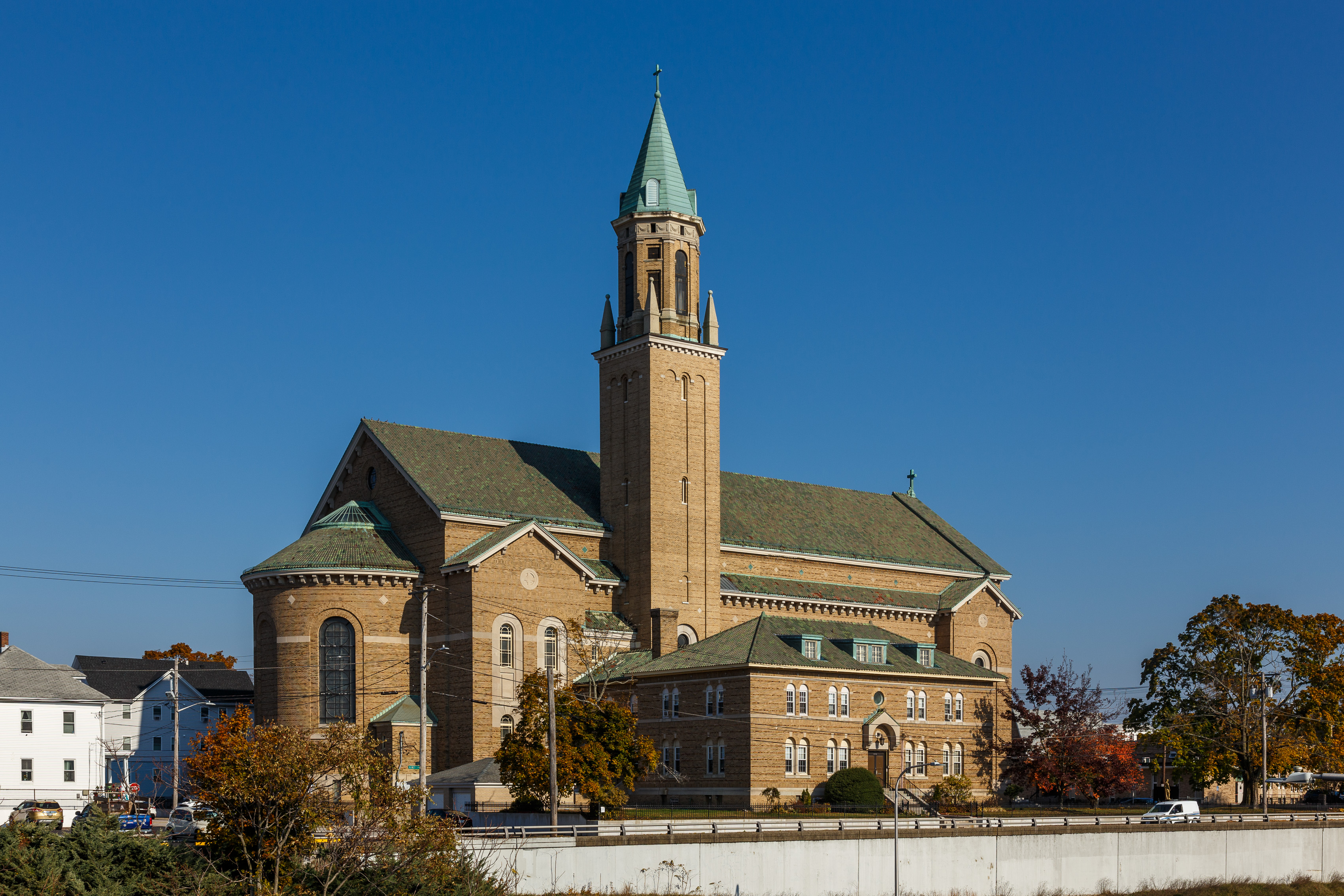

- Location within Rhode Island Location within the United States
- Location: Pawtucket, Rhode Island
- Coordinates: 41°52′24″N 71°23′52″W
- Area: 1.2 acres (0.49 ha)
- Built: 1925
- Architect: Ernest Cormier
- Website: https://www.churchofstjohnthebaptist.org
- MPS: Pawtucket MRA
- NRHP reference No.: 83003855
- Added to NRHP: November 18, 1983

St. John the Baptist Church is an historic Roman Catholic church at 68 Slater Street in Pawtucket, Rhode Island within the Diocese of Providence.

== Description ==
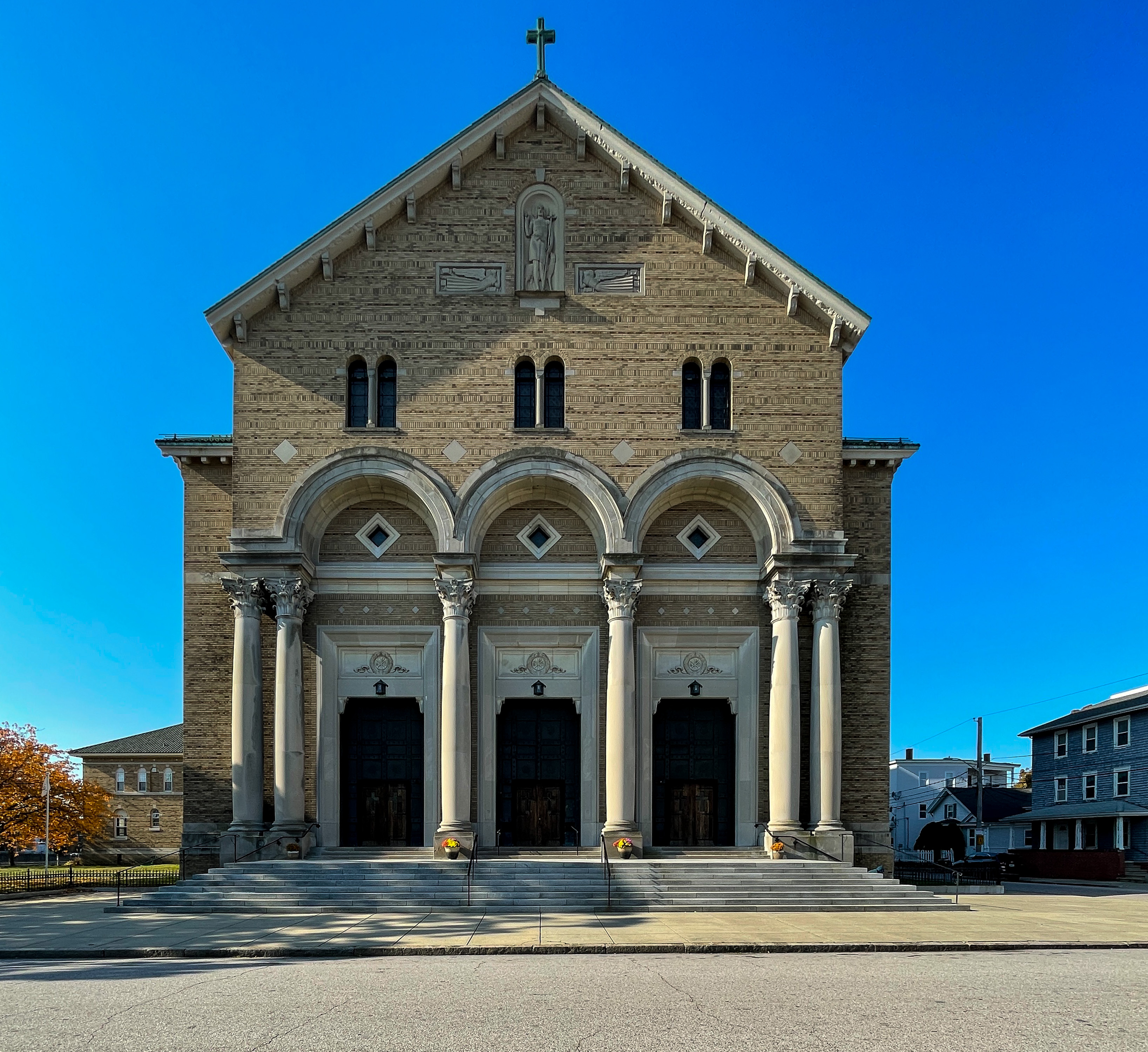
East facade

Built in 1925–27, it is very similar to Notre-Dame de Guadalupe Church in Montreal, also designed by Canadian architect Ernest Cormier. The church is most notable for its particularly lavish interior, which features ceiling artwork by Jean Desauliers and stained glass windows by Mauméjean Frères of Paris.

The church was listed on the National Register of Historic Places in 1983.

== See also ==
- Catholic Church in the United States
- Catholic parish church
- Index of Catholic Church articles
- List of Catholic churches in the United States
- National Register of Historic Places listings in Pawtucket, Rhode Island
- Pastoral care
