= East and West Memorial Buildings =

Pair of government buildings in Ottawa, Canada

Coordinates: 45.419517°N 75.705736°W

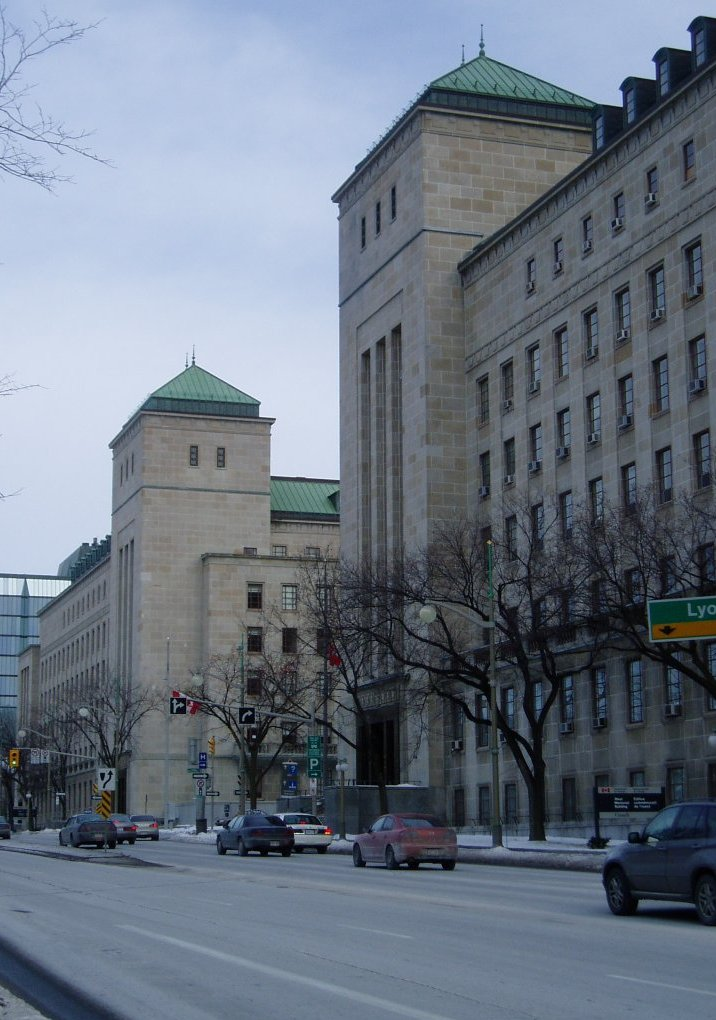
Memorial Buildings

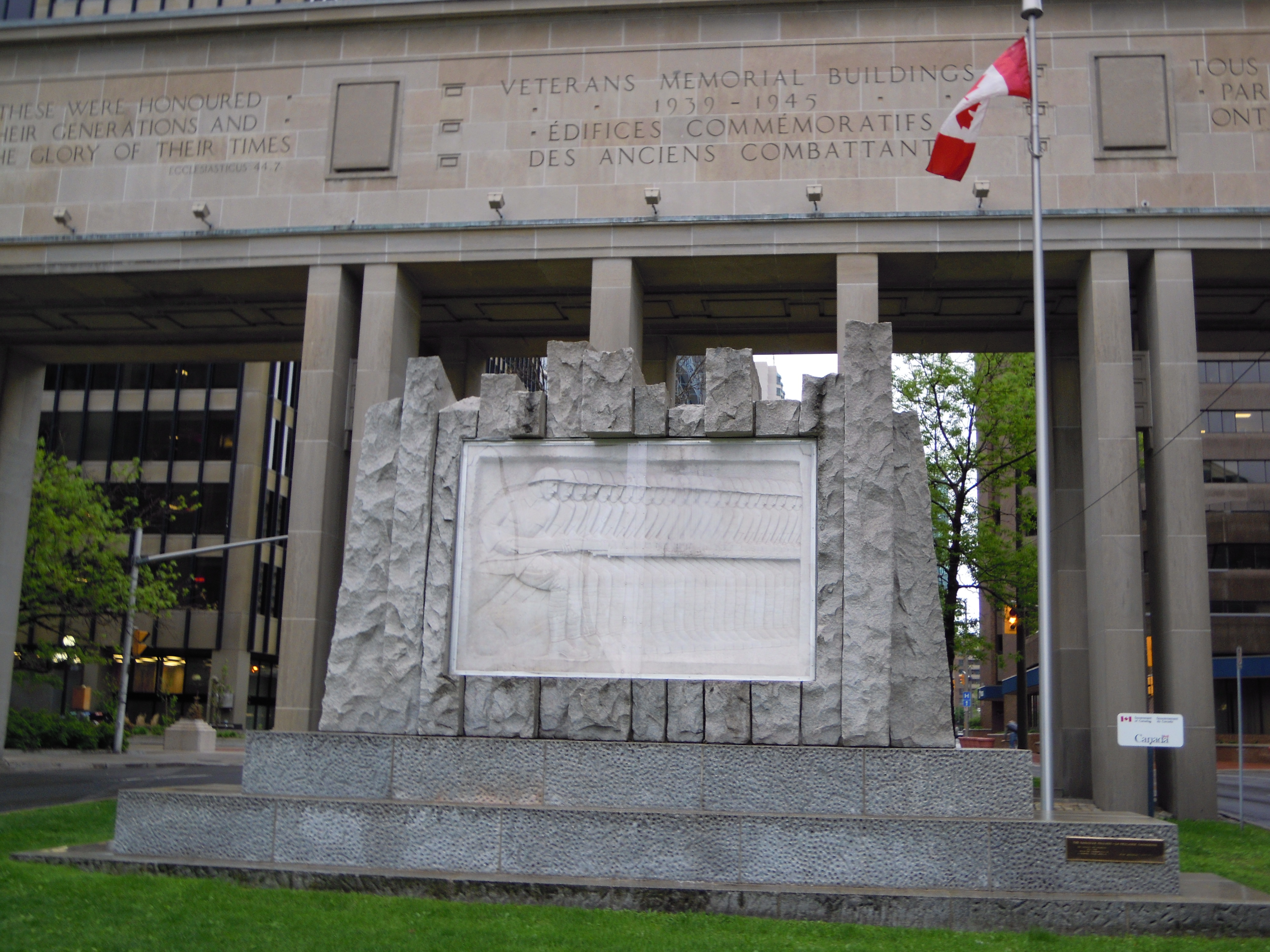
The Canadian Phalanx

The East Memorial Building and West Memorial Building are a pair of government buildings in Ottawa, Ontario, Canada.

== History ==
Construction started in 1949 to house the rapidly growing Department of Veterans Affairs. The buildings were thus originally named the Veterans Memorial Buildings. They were designed by George Roper Gouinlock (son of architect George Wallace Gouinlock) and H.L. Allward and appears to be a stripped down Art Deco style.

The National Capital Commission (NCC) in collaboration with Public Works and Government Services Canada erected a historical plaque:

East and West Memorial Buildings - For those who served. In the 1950s, Canada erected the twin Memorial Buildings on Wellington Street. One of those buildings, at the time housed the new Department of Veterans Affairs. In the 20" century alone, nearly two million Canadians served their country in war. Now Canada serves these people through the Veterans Charter, a pact exceptional in the world for the breadth and scope of services it offers.

At the end of the Second World War in 1945, Canada was determined to help veterans, but it faced an enormous challenge in integrating hundreds of thousands of returning servicemen and servicewomen into Canadian society. The answer was a brilliant array of educational, health, housing and employment programs.

Honouring a generation - The memorial Buildings, erected in 1949 and 1955 respectively, were designed with a sleek melding of neoclassical and copper-roofed chateau styles. The buildings are unusual in that they are linked by the memorial Arch, which is not really an arch at all, but a bridge. The Memorial Arch is dedicated to all who served in the Second World War.

A feat of arms - In April 1945, Canadian troops crossed the Rhine and pushed north to liberate the Netherlands from five long years of occupation. As Canadian tanks rolled into one Dutch town after another, the people went wild with joy and took to the streets in celebration.

Returning to Canada, those who served from 1939 to 1945 were honoured with the title of "veterans" and the gratitude of all Canadians. The Canadian government helped thousands of veterans like Stanley Lolley- a survivor of two World Wars- to get an education or establish businesses. Edward Dunlop of the Queen's Own Rifles was blinded in 1943 while saving others from a grenade explosion and he received the George Medal for valour. He was later active in the rehabilitation of disabled veterans and was awarded the Order of the British Empire for that work.

A memorial is dedicated to the memory of 1701 Men of the Canadian Bank of Commerce who served in the Great War.

The buildings are located on the south side of Wellington Street, across the street from the Supreme Court of Canada Building. Lyon Street passes between the two buildings, but they are linked by the Memorial Arch. Between the two lanes of Lyon Street are gardens and a large stone relief carved by Ivan Meštrović to honour those who fought in the Second World War.

In the early 1980s, as part of Prime Minister Pierre Elliot Trudeau's plans to decentralize the federal government, Veterans Affairs' headquarters moved out of the East Memorial Building and into the Daniel J. MacDonald Building in Charlottetown, Prince Edward Island. Other departments have since moved in. Today the Department of Justice is headquartered in the East Building. The West Memorial Building has been vacant for several years and has been in poor condition. Some offices for the National Archives were also located in these buildings.

== Renovations ==
The West Memorial Building was intended to be renovated from 2019-2023 to restore it to a usable condition, and from 2023-2028 the Supreme Court of Canada, Federal Court of Appeal, and the Federal Court would occupy the premises while their building undergoes renovations. Unexpected delays have forced the schedule to be held back by three years.

The Supreme Court has announced that the 2026 spring term will be the last held in the Supreme Court building pending the renovations. The court will move to the West Memorial Building in the summer of 2026, and will begin to sit in the building in the fall term. It is anticipated that the renovations may take as much as a decade. The federal government has budgeted $1 billion for the renovations to the two buildings.
