= Des Pins Avenue =

Street in Montreal, Quebec, Canada

Pine Avenue
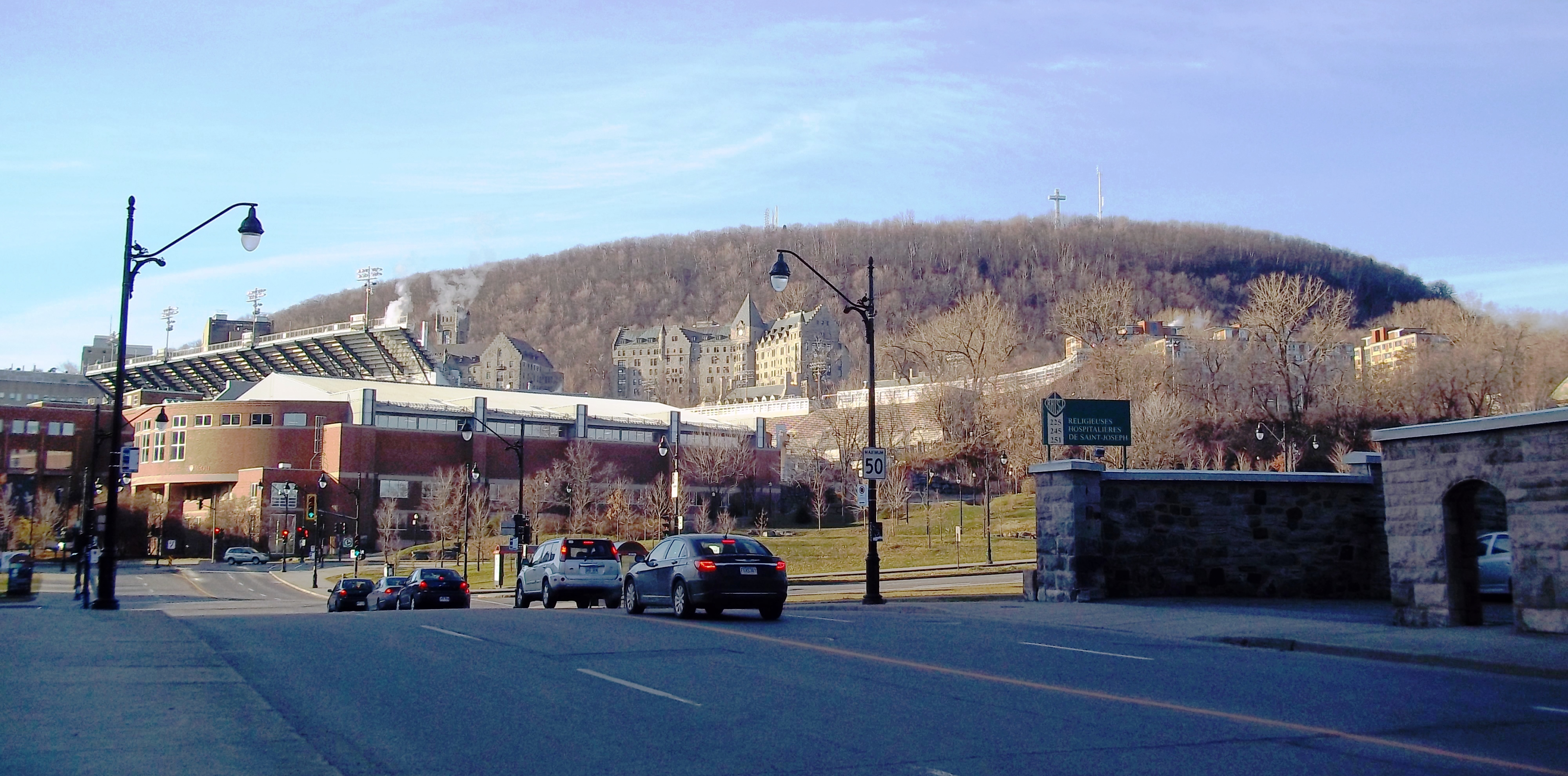
- Pine Avenue and Parc Avenue
- Interactive map of Pine Avenue
- Native name: avenue des Pins (French)
- Former names: Rue de l'Hôtel-Dieu; Pine Avenue.
- Length: 2.8 km (1.7 mi)
- Location: Montreal
- Coordinates: 45.518596°N 73.57205°W
- East end: Saint Denis Street
- West end: Côte-des-Neiges Road

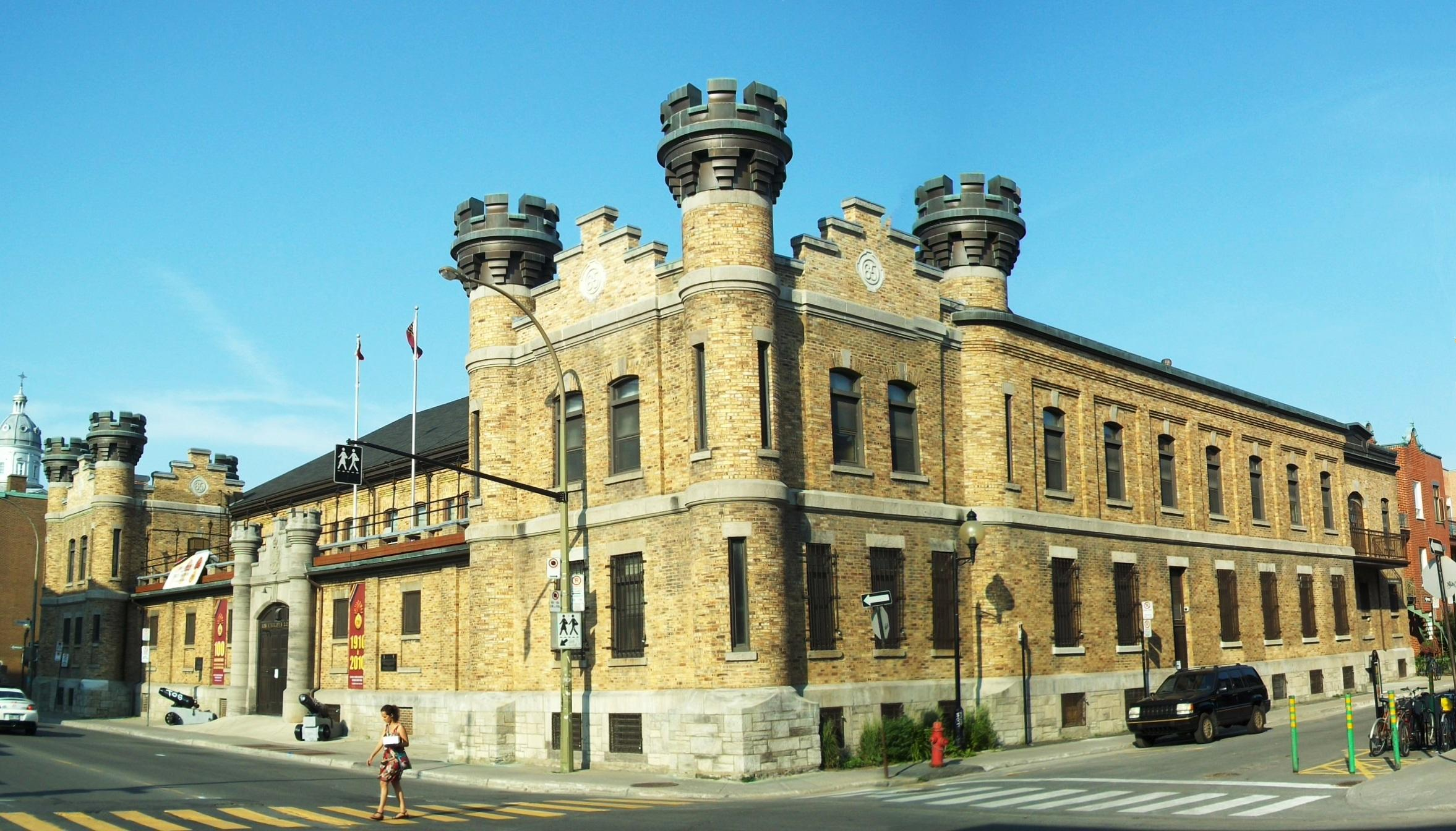
Armoury of Les Fusiliers Mont-Royal, Pine Avenue and Henri-Julien Street

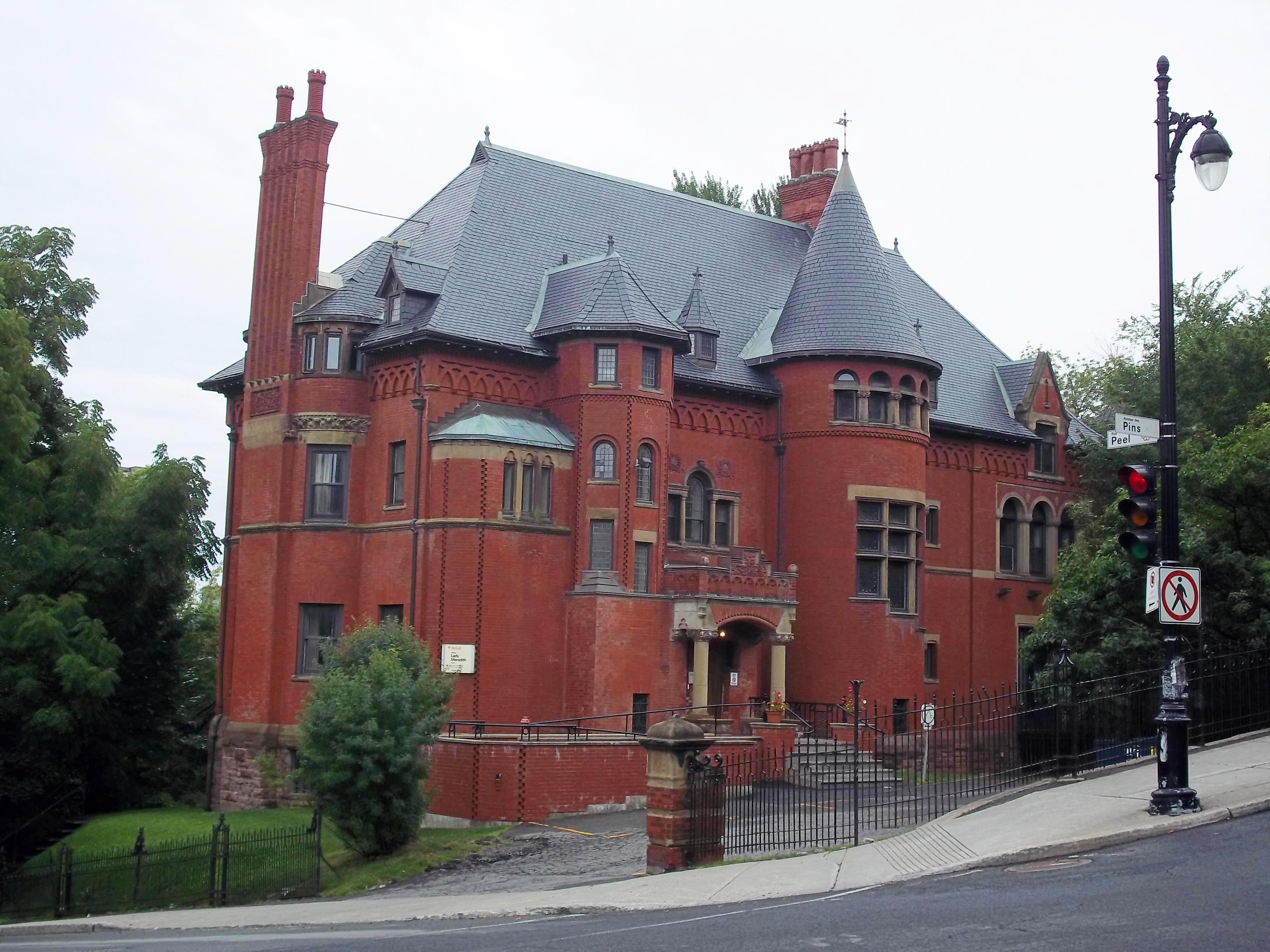
Lady Meredith House, McGill University, Pine and Peel Street

Pine Avenue (French: avenue des Pins) is an east–west street in Montreal, Quebec, Canada. This street serves as the dividing line between the downtown Ville-Marie borough and borough of Le Plateau-Mont-Royal, and also serves as the northern border of the Golden Square Mile historic district, further west.

The street borders the eastern side of Mount Royal. It begins at Saint Denis Street in the east, and ends at Côte-des-Neiges Road in the west. The entire length is serviced by the 144 Avenue des Pins bus.

The Montreal Neurological Institute, the former Royal Victoria Hospital, Allan Memorial Institute and the Montreal General Hospital of McGill University are on Pine Avenue, as is Cormier House, the former residence of Pierre Elliott Trudeau.

The former Pine-Parc Interchange at the intersection of Pine with Parc Avenue, now demolished, was the only constructed section of the proposed Autoroute 415.

== Points of interest ==
- Cormier House
- Lady Meredith House
- Les Fusiliers Mont-Royal
- McIntyre Medical Sciences Building
- Montreal General Hospital
- Montreal Neurological Institute and Hospital
- Osler Library of the History of Medicine
- Percival Molson Memorial Stadium
- Royal Victoria Hospital

== History ==
Pine Avenue was built in the 1800s in industrial Montreal. Travelling East-West, Pine Avenue starts in the east at Saint-Denis Street, and ends in the West at Cote-des-Neiges Road, passing the south side of Mount Royal. The Religious Hospitallers of Saint Joseph relocated the Hotel-Dieu de Montreal on Saint-Urbain Street between 1859 and 1861. In 1864, a private road named rue de l'Hôtel-Dieu was created. Frederick Law Olmsted provided plans for construction of the roads on the south side of Mount Royal in 1875. The following year, in 1876, the city council finalized plans to open three roads, named Elm, Cedar, and Pine. This plan included incorporating the rue de l'Hôtel-Dieu into Pine Avenue.

== Public transit ==
Bus routes along Pine Avenue includes the Montreal Transit Corporation’s 144 Avenue Des Pins and 360 Avenue Des Pins. The 144 bus is wheelchair accessible and connects to the Atwater or Sherbrooke metro station, and the 360 is an ‘all-night’ bus that connects to Atwater or Frontenac metro station. There are no bus lanes along the length of the road. The eastern side of Pine Avenue (east of where Pine and Park meet) has bicycle trails for safe biking in the city. Further, Pine Avenue has one of the largest entrances to the Mount Royal Mountain's hiking trails which was recently redone.

== Pine-Park Interchange Reconstruction ==
In 2004 the Pine Avenue and Park Avenue intersection underwent reconstruction. Prior to 2004, the intersection had a large interchange structure. The Pine-Park Interchange was too complex for a downtown inner-city intersection. The three-year construction project, beginning in 2004, demolished the overpass in an attempt to make the intersection more friendly to pedestrians and cyclists, as well as to fit the traffic needs of the downtown area better. The project completely levelled out the intersection. Taking just under three years, the reconstruction ended in the fall of 2007. The successful urban development project features a 2 to 1 lane merge towards Downtown Montreal to mitigate the traffic as well as crosswalks making the intersection accessible to pedestrians.
