= Supreme Court of Canada Building =

Home to the Supreme Court of Canada since 1946

Supreme Court of Canada building
- Exterior of the Supreme Court of Canada building

General information
- Completed: 1941
- Owner: Government of Canada

Design and construction
- Architect: Ernest Cormier

The Supreme Court of Canada Building (French: édifice de la Cour suprême du Canada) is located just west of Parliament Hill, at 301 Wellington Street. It is situated on a bluff high above the Ottawa River in downtown Ottawa and is home to the Supreme Court of Canada. It also contains two courtrooms used by the Federal Court and the Federal Court of Appeal.

== History ==
=== Early buildings 1875–1945 ===
When the Supreme Court of Canada was established in 1875, it was housed in the Railway Committee Room and a number of other committee rooms in the Centre Block on Parliament Hill.

In 1882, the Supreme Court of Canada moved into permanent accommodations in the refurbished building located at the southwest corner of the West Block on Parliament Hill, facing Bank Street. Originally constructed in 1873 as workshops and stables for the government, the building was designed by Chief Dominion Architect Thomas Seaton Scott. During the early years the Court shared the building with National Art Gallery. Despite its new home, members of the Court made numerous complaints about the facility, including a persistent "dreadful smell", poor ventilation, cramped space, a lack of offices, and its inconvenient distance from the Library of Parliament.

In the 1930s, the R.B. Bennett government began considering costs and site locations for a new building, but it wasn't until 1935 when Mackenzie King was re-elected were serious efforts made to construct a new building.

An inspection was undertaken which recommended the building be condemned. The inspection documented fire hazards, rotting structures, cramped quarters and poor sanitary conditions of the building. The washroom facilities were bad and the women's washroom was described in the report as "toilet for the women consists of one bowl placed in a dark comer underneath the stairway. It should be condemned forthwith." Additionally, the justices' offices were described as "thoroughly inadequate and injurious to the health of the occupants."

=== New building ===
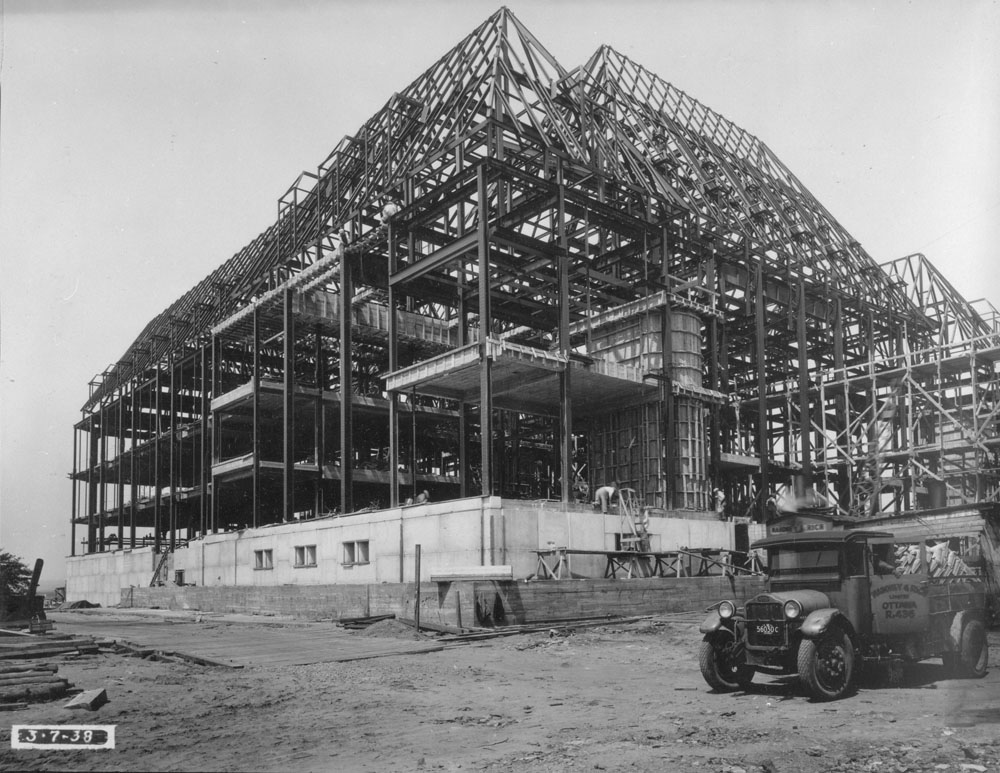
Supreme Court of Canada Building under construction in 1938.

In 1936, Justice Minister Ernest Lapointe recommended to Cabinet a new building which was supported by Prime Minister King, and subsequently approved by Parliament.

The new building's original design instructions saw a shared use three building complex housing the Privy Council, Supreme Court, and various government commissions. Ernest Cormier was selected to design the buildings, and began consulting with the Court and Chief Justice Duff. A design was finalized and construction began in 1938, with Queen Elizabeth the Queen Mother, consort of King George VI laying the cornerstone in May 1939. In her speech, she said, "perhaps it is not inappropriate that this task should be performed by a woman; for woman's position in a civilized society has depended upon the growth of law."

The new building was completed in 1941, but was used by government staff for the war effort. Finally, in January 1946, the Supreme Court of Canada moved into the new building.

== Design ==
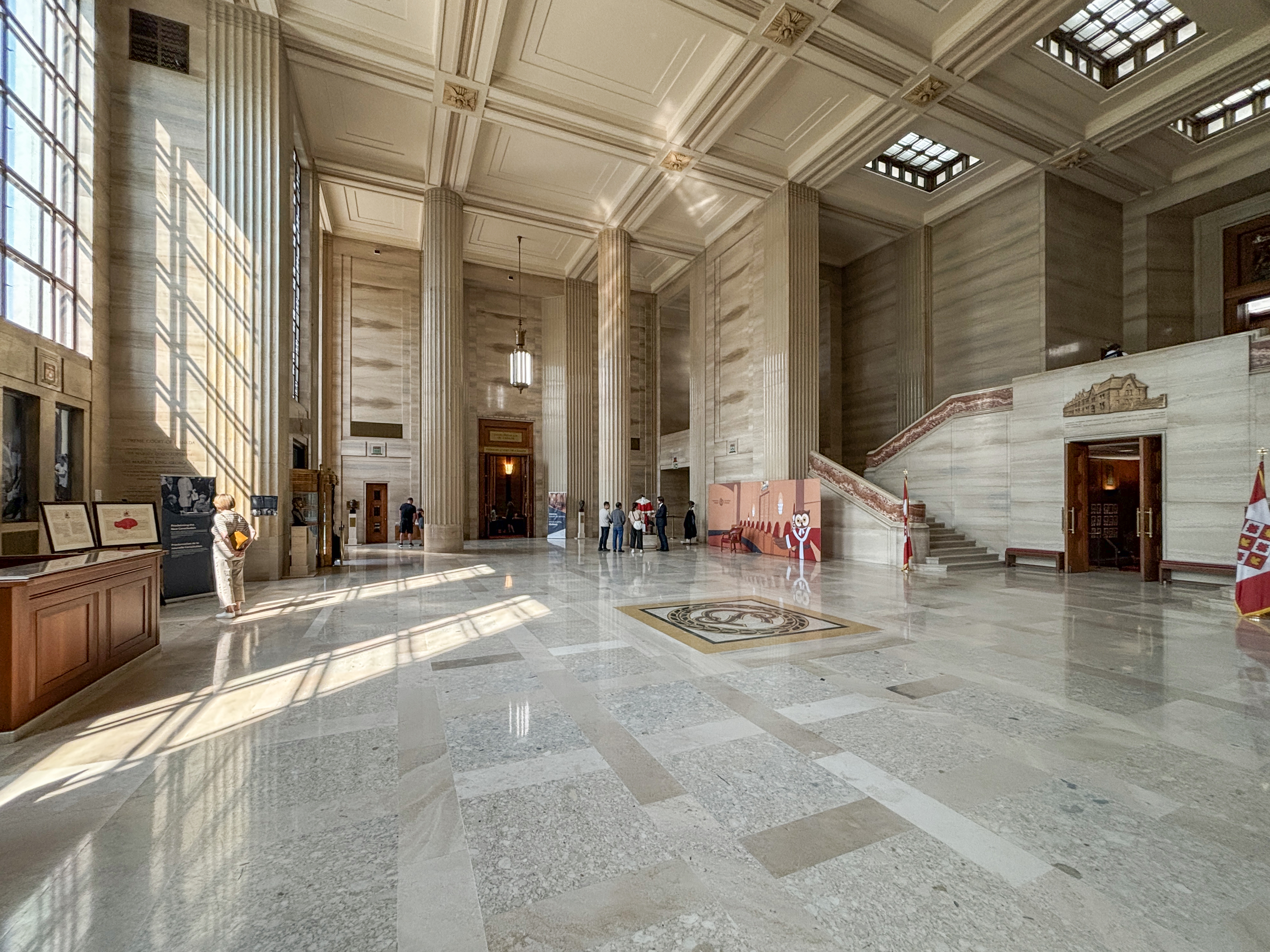
Lobby

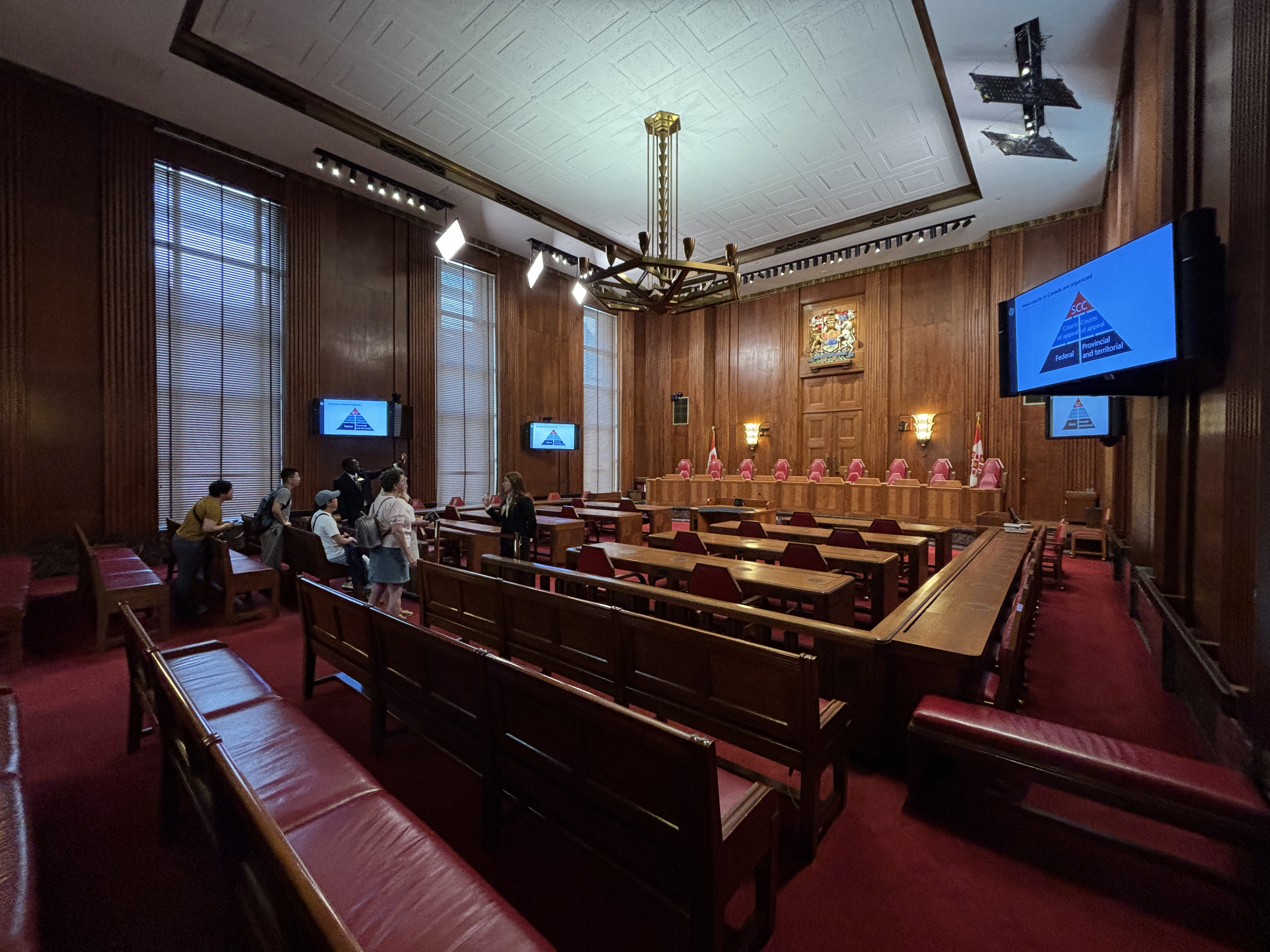
Supreme Court

The building was designed by Ernest Cormier and is known for its Art Deco style—including two candelabrum-style fluted metal lamp standards that flank the entrance and the marble walls and floors of the lobby—contrasting with the châteauesque roof.

The design of the Supreme Court Building likely influenced Jacques Gréber's architectural character for his 1949 Plan for the development of the National Capital Region. Additionally, the nearby Library and Archives Canada Building completed in 1967 was designed with Canadian granite exterior to harmonize with the Supreme Court of Canada Building.

In 2000, the edifice was named by the Royal Architectural Institute of Canada as one of the top 500 buildings produced in Canada during the last millennium. Canada Post issued a commemorative stamp on 9 June 2011, as part of the Architecture Art Déco series.

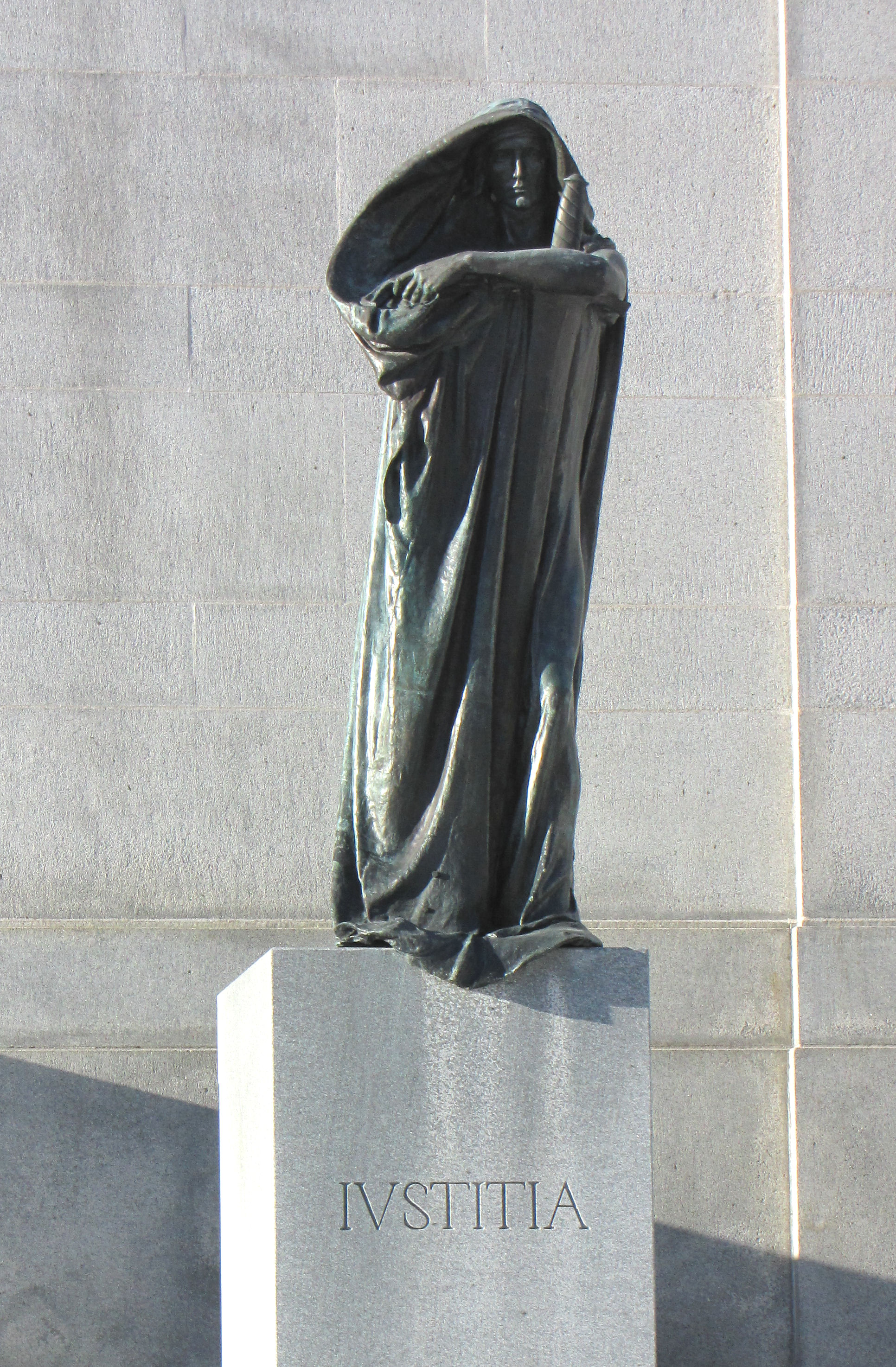
Statue of Justitia

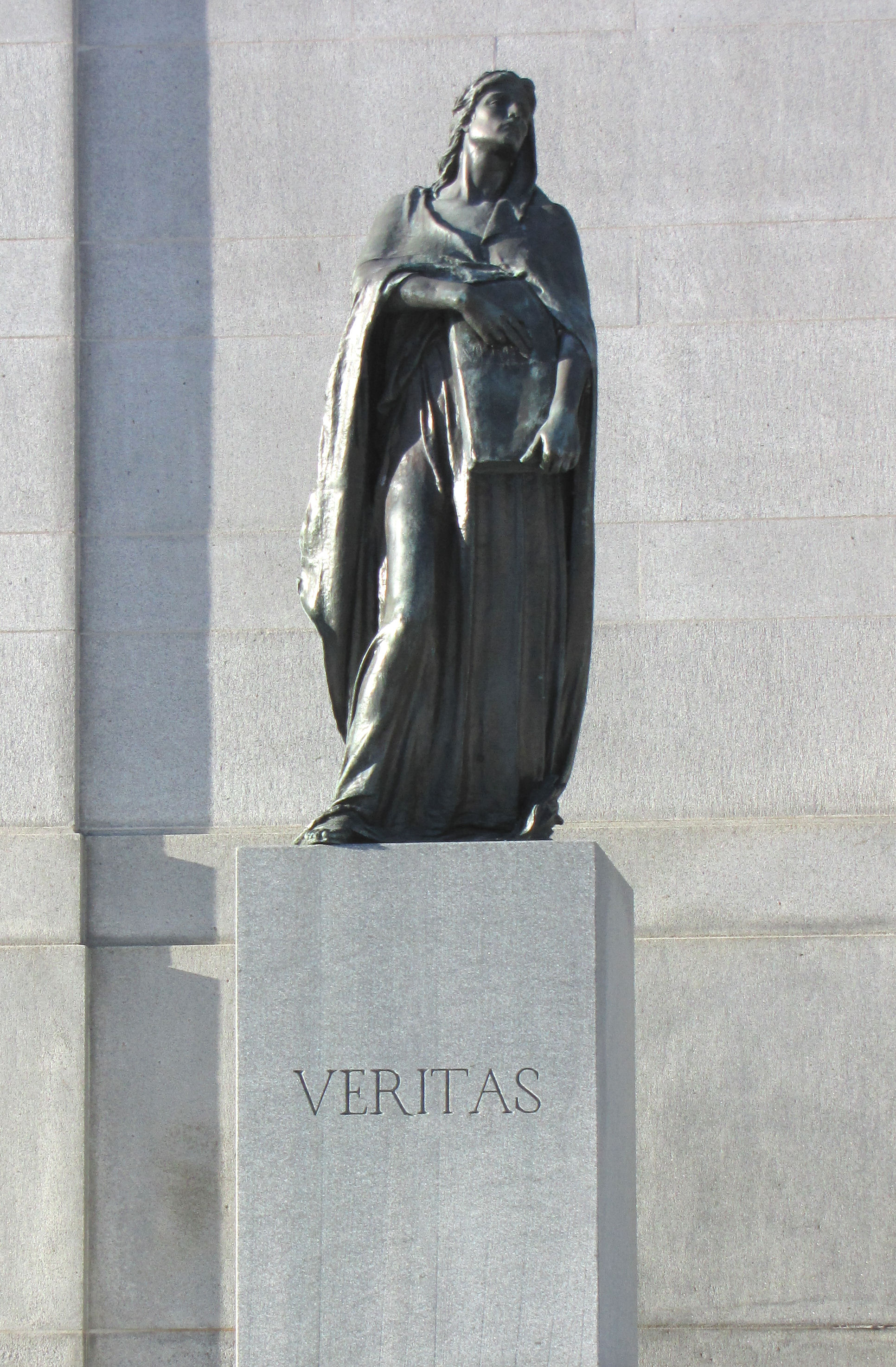
Statue of Veritas

Two statues sculpted by Walter Allward are located on the grounds of the Supreme Court building.

Two flagstaffs have been erected in front of the building. A flag on one is flown daily, while the other is hoisted only on those days when the court is in session. Also located on the grounds are several statues, including one of Prime Minister Louis St. Laurent, by Elek Imredy in 1976, and two—Veritas (Truth) and Justitia (Justice)—by Canadian sculptor Walter S. Allward. Inside there are busts of several chief justices: John Robert Cartwright (1967–1970), Bora Laskin (1973–1983), Brian Dickson (1984–1990), and Antonio Lamer (1990–2000), all sculpted by Kenneth Phillips Jarvis, a retired Under Treasurer of the Law Society of Upper Canada.

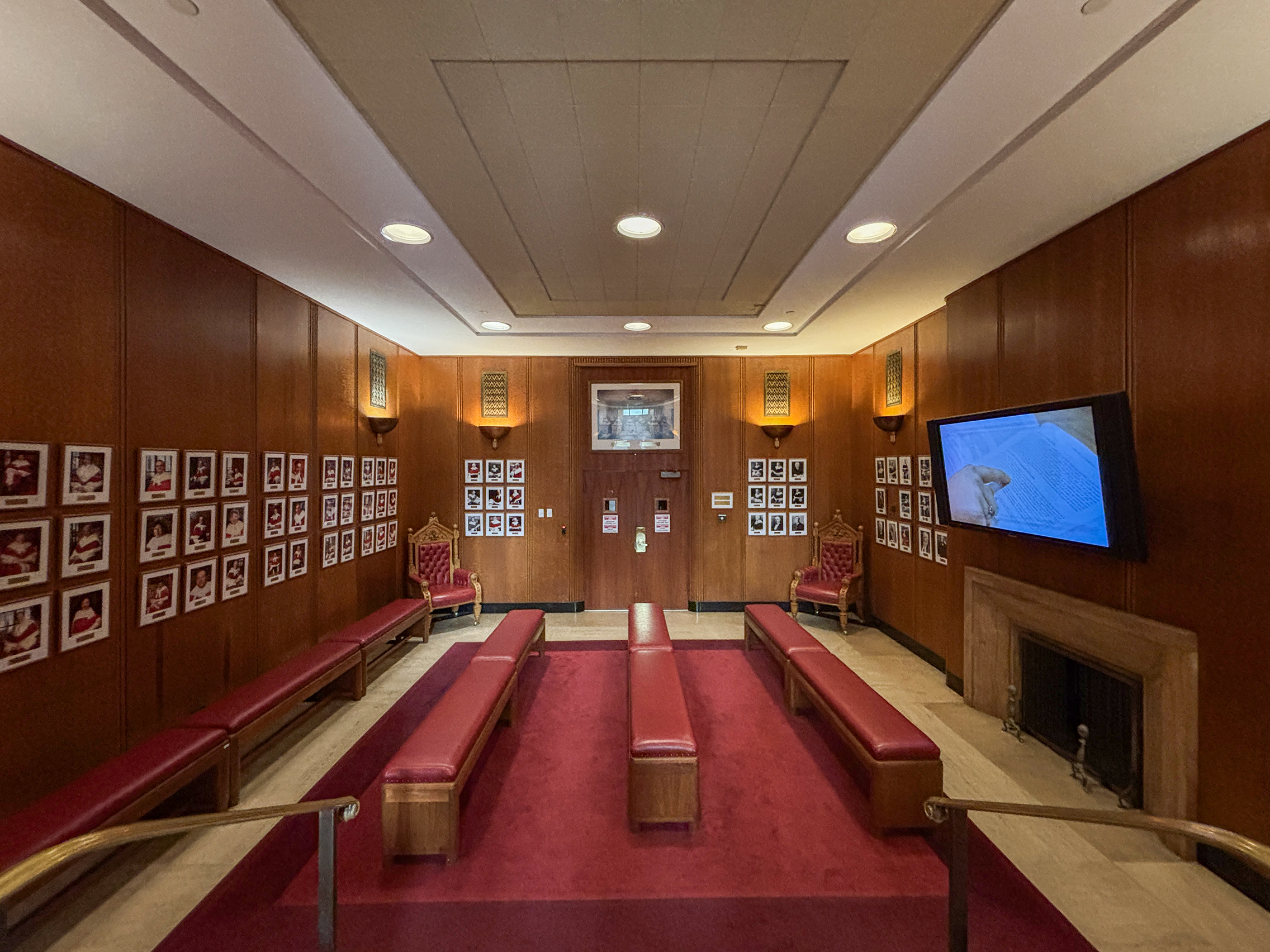
Gallery

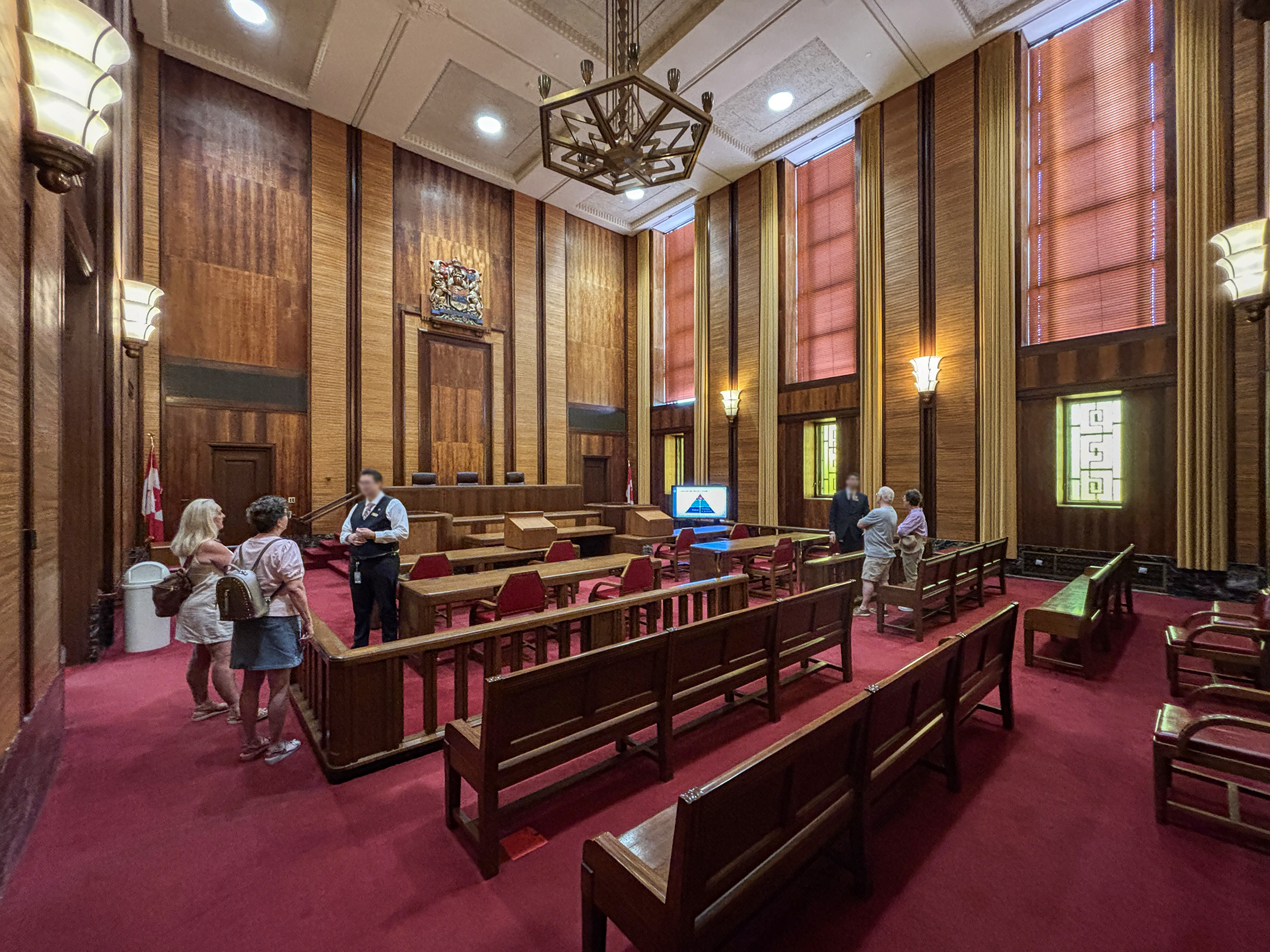
Federal Court of Appeal in Supreme Court of Canada 2025.jpg

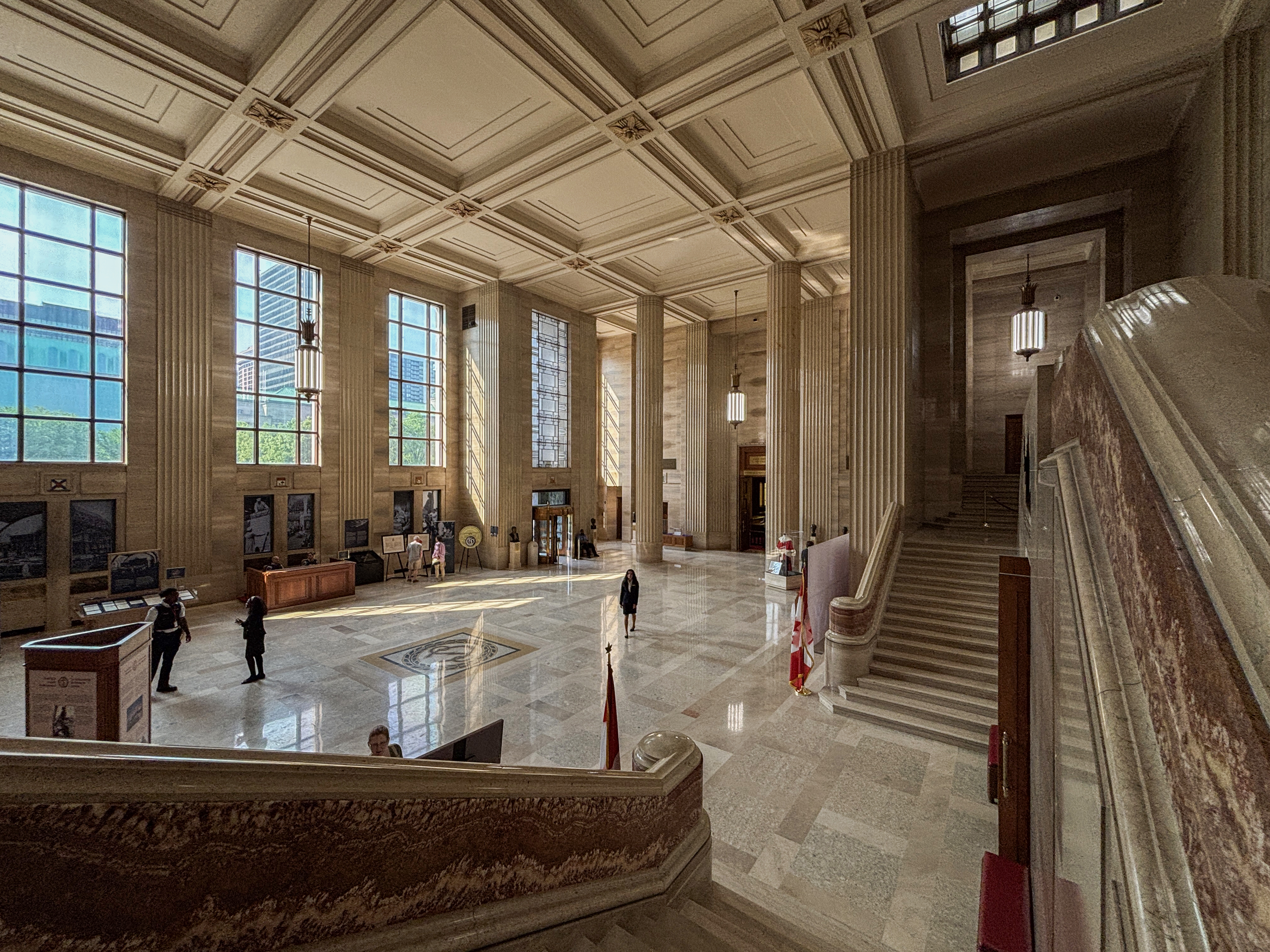
Stairs in the lobby

== Closing for renovations ==
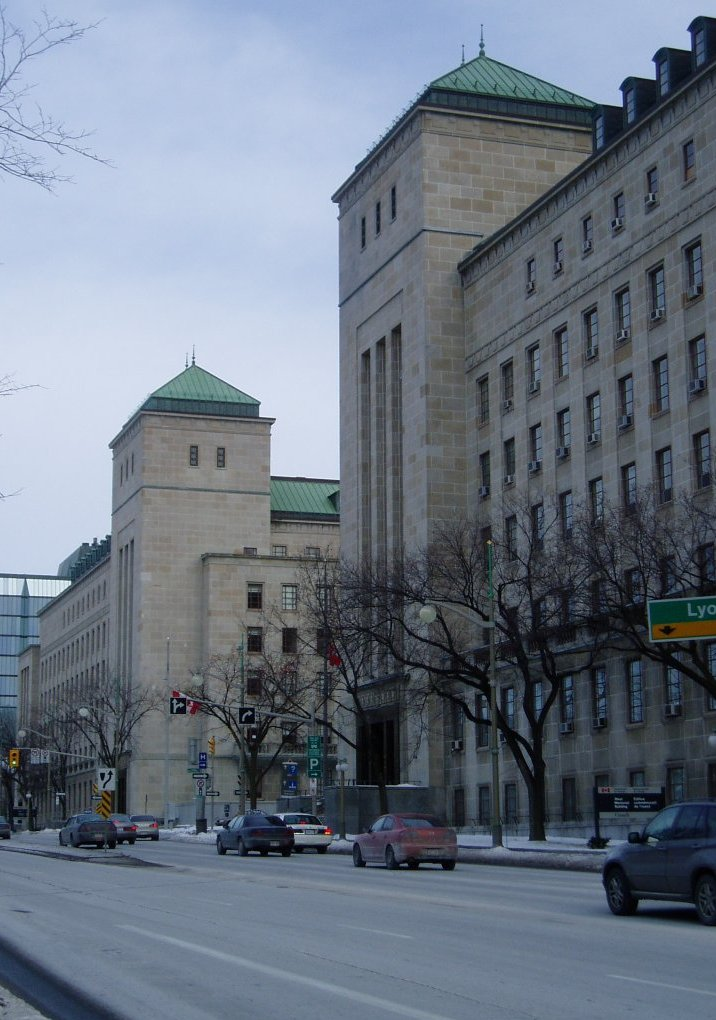
The East and West Memorial buildings, Ottawa

The building has been in need of renovations and repairs for some time, particularly in relation to removing asbestos, restoring walls and windows, and upgrading electrical systems. It is also planned to bring the building up to current earthquake building codes. The court has announced that the work will begin in the summer of 2026. The court will relocate to a new temporary location, the West Memorial Building, a few blocks away. It is anticipated that the renovations and repairs may take as long as a decade. The federal government has allocated a budget of $1 billion for the project.

== See also ==
- Centre Block § Centre Block project
