= Ernest Cormier =

Canadian engineer and architect

Ernest Cormier OC
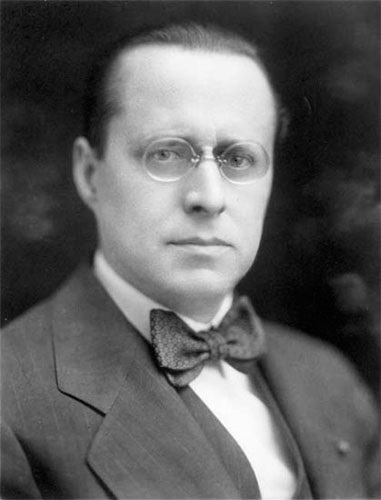
- Cormier in the 1920s
- Born: December 5, 1885; Montreal, Quebec
- Died: January 1, 1980 (aged 94)
- Education: École nationale supérieure des Beaux-Arts
- Occupation: Architect
- Buildings: Central building of the Université de Montréal; Casault pavilion of Université Laval; Supreme Court of Canada Building

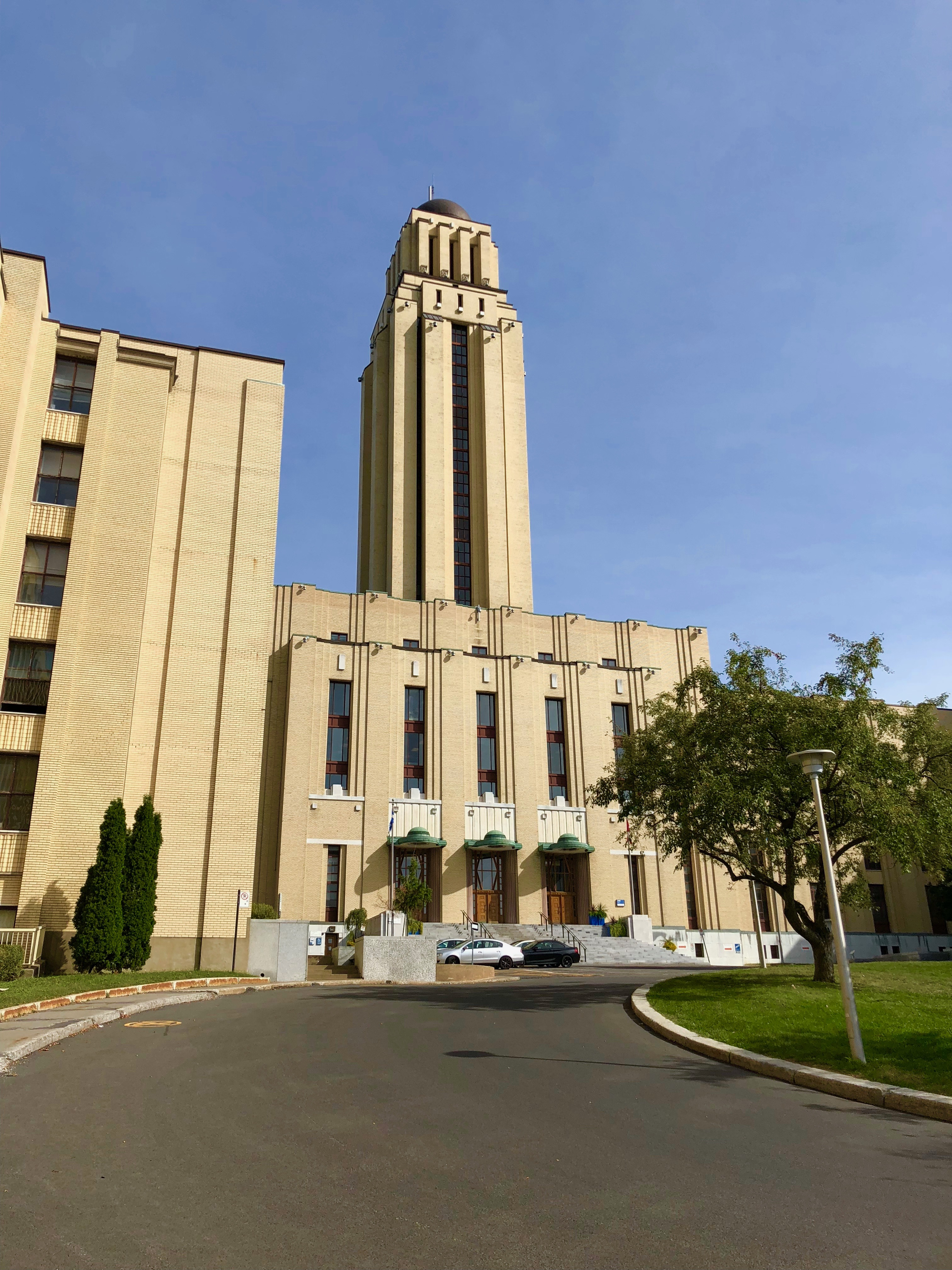
Central building of the Université de Montréal (Roger Gaudry Building)

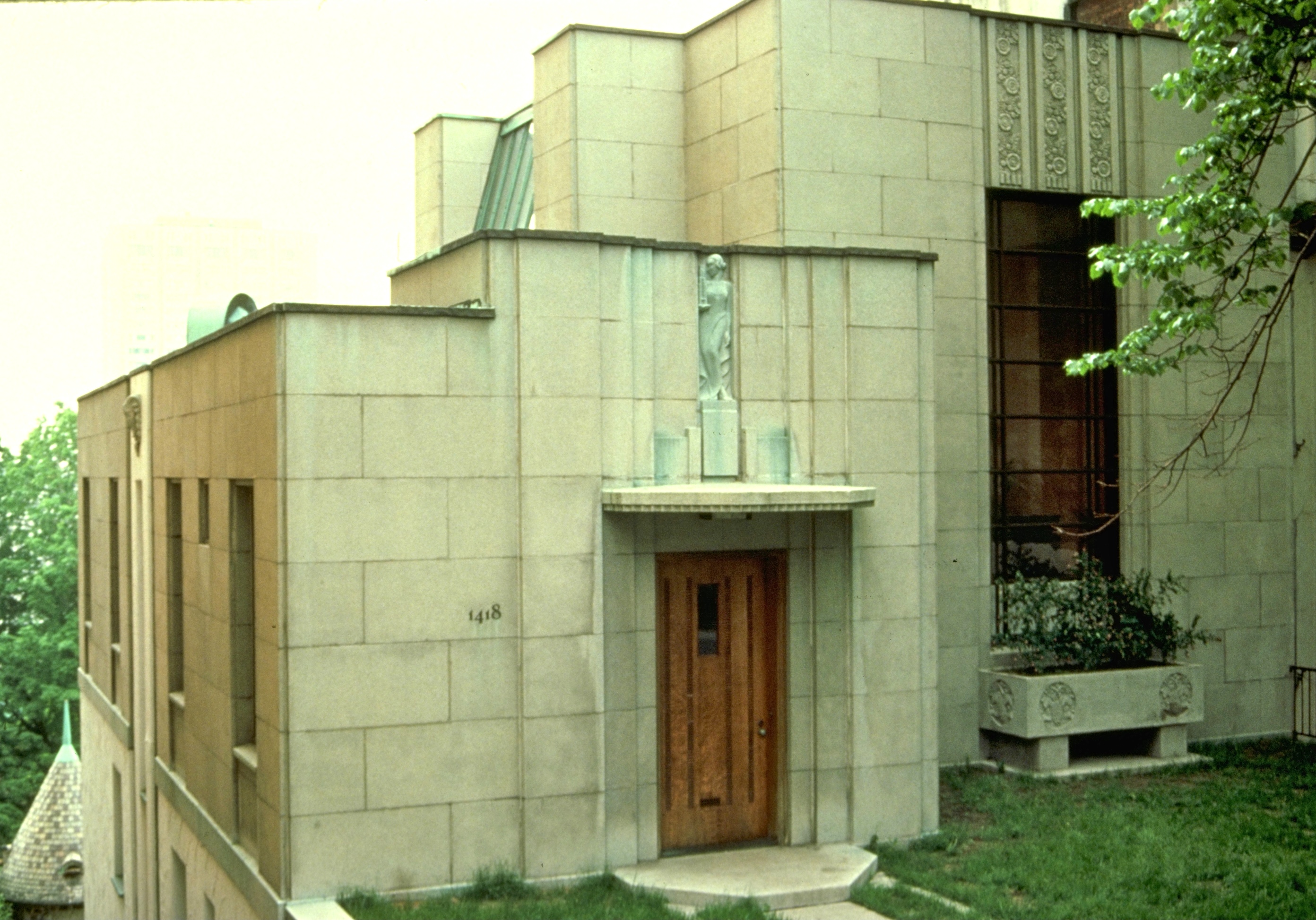
Cormier House in Montreal

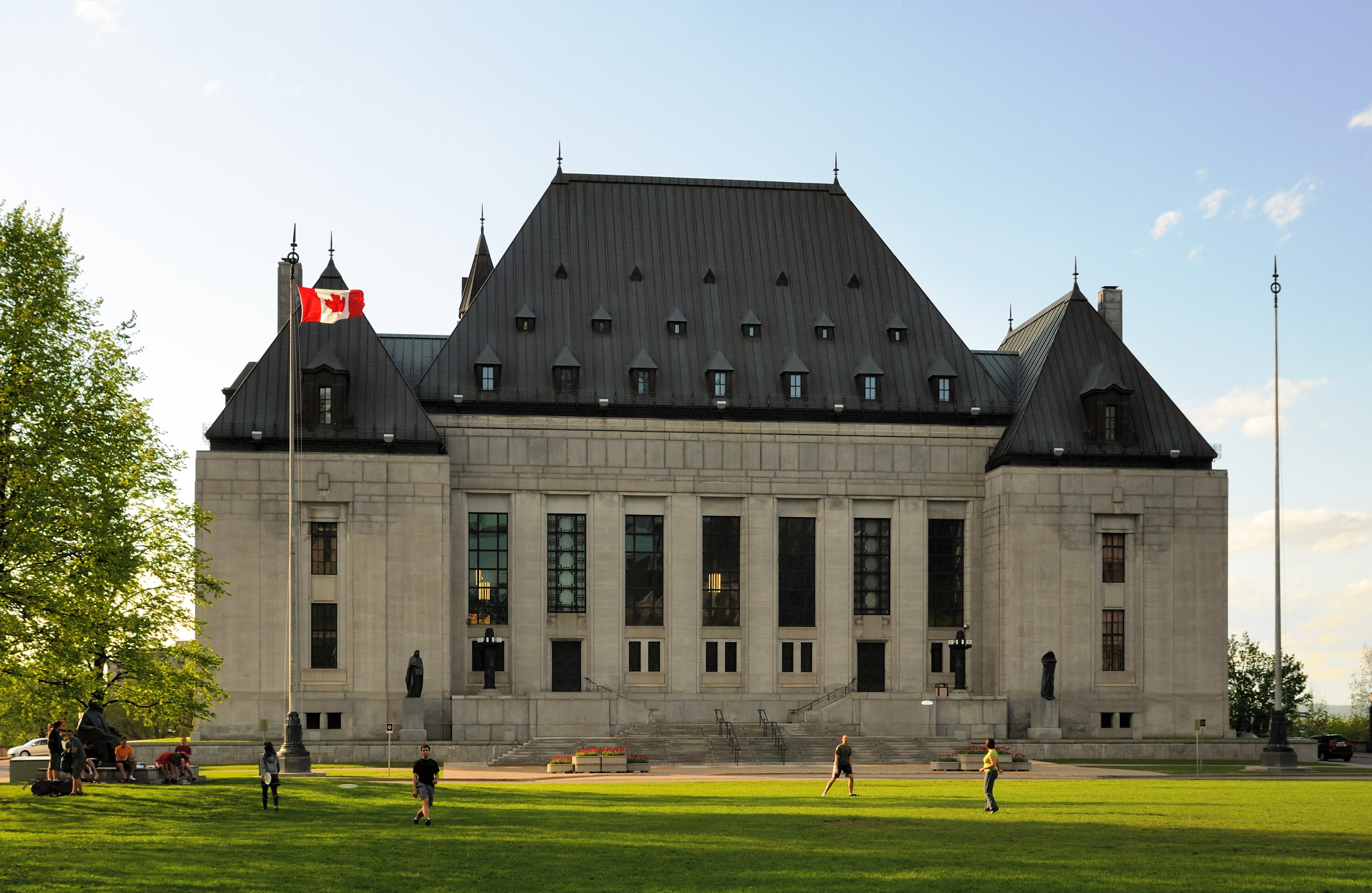
Supreme Court of Canada Building in Ottawa

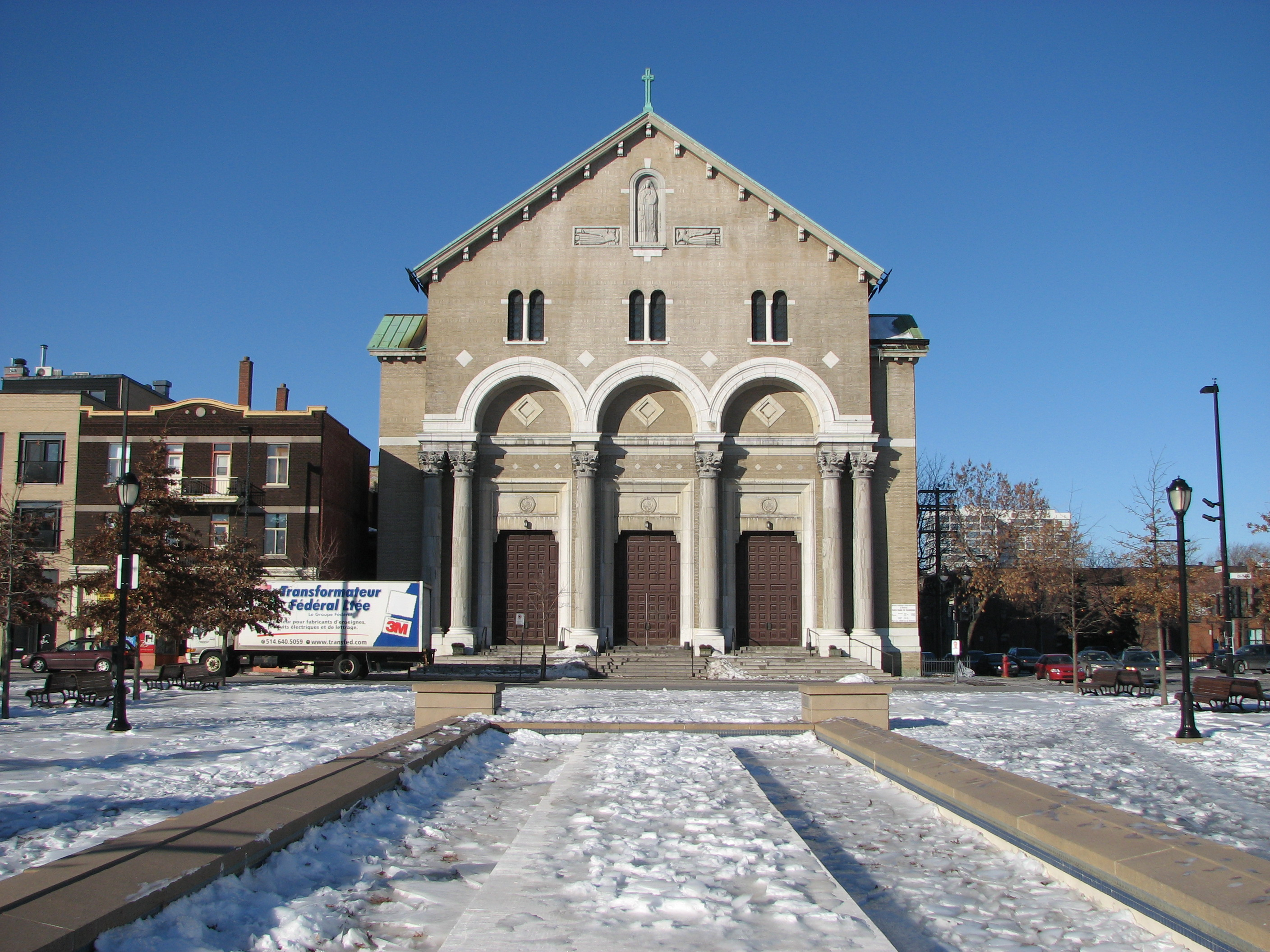
Église Sainte-Marguerite-Marie-Alacoque, Montreal (1924–1925)

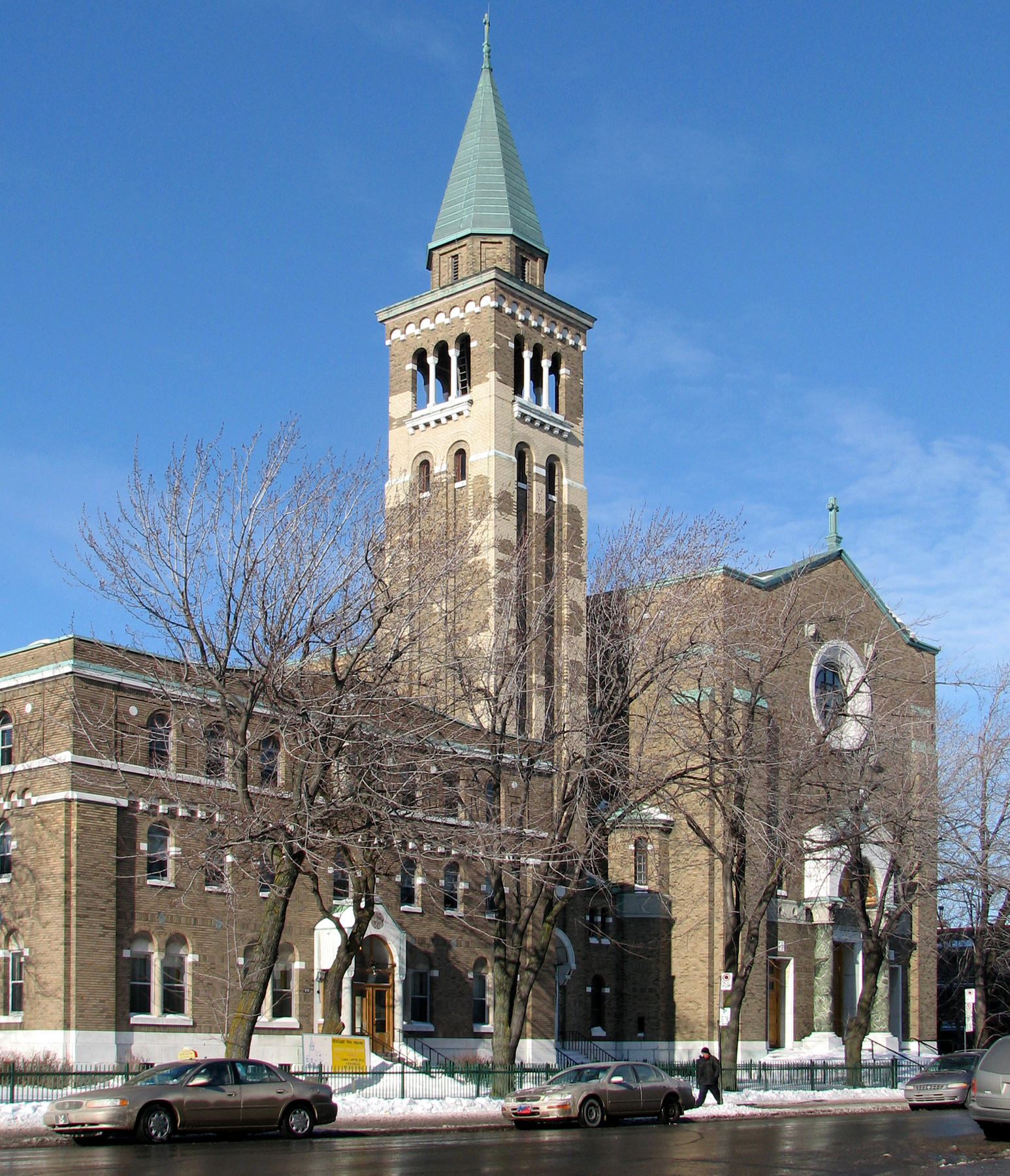
Église Saint-Ambroise, Montreal (1923)

Ernest Cormier OC (December 5, 1885 – January 1, 1980) was a Canadian engineer and architect. He spent much of his career in the Montreal area, designing notable examples of Art Deco architecture, including the Université de Montréal original main building, the Supreme Court of Canada Building in Ottawa, and the Cormier House (his home in Montreal's Golden Square Mile).

== Life and career ==
Cormier was born in Montreal, the son of a medical doctor, and he studied civil engineering at the École Polytechnique in Montreal. After graduation in 1906, he worked in the research department of the Dominion Bridge Company in Montreal.

In 1909, he studied at the École nationale supérieure des Beaux-Arts in Paris, in the atelier of Jean-Louis Pascal. In 1914, he was the recipient of the Henry Jarvis Scholarship, awarded by the Royal Institute of British Architects. Through its British Prix de Rome, Cormier spent two years in Rome, where he studied the ancient works. Following his return to Paris in January 1917, he was employed by the engineering firm of Considère, Pelnard et Caquot, specialists in concrete, and he graduated as an architect of the French Government (DPLG).

He was a professor at the École Polytechnique in Montreal from 1921 to 1954. After his death in 1980, he was interred in Notre Dame des Neiges Cemetery in Montreal.

== Major works ==
=== Université de Montréal – Roger Gaudry Building ===
Cormier's major work is the central building of the Université de Montréal (now known as the Roger Gaudry Building) on the north slope of Mount Royal. This huge example of the Art Deco style was built between World War I and the middle of World War II, and it has been kept in a nearly pristine shape over the decades. It is a composition of simple forms of planes and surfaces in successive relief, emphasizing vertical lines. The light buff vitrified brick has trimmings of Missisquoi marble. The only major destruction of his designs took place within the interior spaces. These changes occurred in the 1970s, when the great multi-storey hall of the central library was filled up with several smaller, single-storey rooms for the faculty of medicine and its library.

=== Université Laval – Casault pavilion ===
Another important example of Cormier's work can be found on another Quebec university campus, the Casault pavilion of Université Laval (named after the first rector of the university), familiarly known by students as the 'Louis-Jacques'. The design was originally started by the Benedictine architect monk Dom Bellot but completed by Cormier after Dom Bellot's death. Plans were laid out in 1948 but only completed in 1960, it is a massive cathedral-like building, originally designed as Quebec City's Grand Séminaire, which is particularly spectacular viewed from a distance along the impressive mall that runs along the east–west axis of the campus grounds. Despite an unfortunate renovation scheme in the 1970s, which gutted the chapel, filled in the magnificent enclosed courtyard and transformed the interior into an undecipherable labyrinth, the building has become the most recognized landmark of the second-oldest university in North America and home to Laval's faculties of Music and Communications, as well as to Quebec's National Archives (in the former church).

=== Rhode Island churches ===
Cormier also designed two important Roman Catholic Churches for the Diocese of Providence, Rhode Island, USA. One of them, St. John the Baptist Church of Pawtucket, Rhode Island, has been placed on the National Register of Historic Places. His other work as Notre Dame du Sacre Coeur, 666 Broad Street in Central Falls.

=== Cormier House ===
Cormier's own home, on Montreal's Pine Avenue, is one of the finest examples of an Art Deco dwelling in the world. Former Canadian prime minister Pierre Trudeau purchased the building in 1979, and he lived there following his retirement until his death in 2000.

=== Supreme Court of Canada Building ===
Cormier is also responsible for the classic château-style Supreme Court of Canada Building (1939–40) in Ottawa.

=== Other commissions ===
He was a design consultant for the United Nations building in New York City. In Toronto, Cormier designed St. Michael's College School (1950) and Carr Hall at St. Michael's College (University of Toronto, 1954).

== Style and legacy ==
In addition to showing great balance between the disciplines of engineering and architecture in most of his buildings, Cormier also had great skills as a painter and illustrator. He left many renderings of his works, done in the planning stages.

In 1974, Cormier was inducted into the Order of Canada by Governor General Jules Léger, and he received numerous honours and awards. The Édifice Ernest-Cormier (which he co-designed), the Quebec Court of Appeal building in Old Montreal, is named in his honour.

In 2018, Cormier was named a National Historic Person, and the Ernest Cormier House and the Roger Gaudry Building (at the Université de Montréal) were designated National Historic Sites.

== Exhibitions ==
- Trois architectes, trois quartiers : Ludger Lemieux (St. Henri), Ernest Cormier (Cité universitaire), Ernest Isbell Barott (St. Antoine), Montreal, Canadian Centre for Architecture, May 20, 1983 to August 19, 1983.
- Ernest Cormier and the Université de Montréal, Montreal, Canadian Centre for Architecture, May 2, 1990 to October 21, 1990.
- Sighting the Université de Montréal: Photographs by Gabor Szilasi, Montreal, Canadian Centre for Architecture, May 2, 1990 to October 28, 1990.
- Montréal Métropole, 1880–1930, Montreal, Canadian Centre for Architecture, March 18, 1998 to May 24, 1998.

== See also ==
- Architecture of Quebec
