= List of justices of the Supreme Court of Canada =

The Supreme Court of Canada is the highest court of Canada. It was established by the Parliament of Canada through the Supreme and Exchequer Court Act in 1875. Since 1949, the Court has been the final court of appeal in the Canadian justice system. Originally composed of six justices (the Chief Justice of Canada and five puisne justices), the Court was expanded to seven justices by the creation of an additional puisne justice position in 1927, and then to nine justices by the creation of two more puisne justice positions in 1949.

The justices are appointed by the governor general on the advice of the prime minister. When a chief justice leaves office, the vacancy is traditionally filled by elevating an incumbent puisne justice to the position, which requires a separate appointment process. The first six justices of the Court were all appointed in 1875 by Governor General the Earl of Dufferin, on the advice of Prime Minister Alexander Mackenzie.

Of the nine justices, three positions are required by law to be held by judges who are either judges of the superior courts of Quebec, or members of the Bar of Quebec, at the time of their appointment. Traditionally, three of the remaining judges are appointed from Ontario, two from the four western provinces, and one from the Atlantic provinces. The judges from these provinces, other than Quebec, must have been a judge of a superior court, or a member of the bar of one of those provinces for ten or more years prior to the appointment.

Justices hold office until age 75, during good behaviour. They are removable by the Governor General on address of the Senate and House of Commons. When the Court was created in 1875, the justices had life tenure, but in 1927 this was converted to mandatory retirement at age 75. The amendment applied immediately to any judge who was already over age 75 at the time it came into force. As a result, Justice John Idington, aged 86, was forced to retire from the Court.

Since the Supreme Court was created in 1875, 92 persons have served on the Court. The length of overall service on the Court for the 83 non-incumbent justices ranges from Sir Lyman Duff's 37 years, 101 days, to the 232-day tenure of John Douglas Armour. The length of service for the nine incumbent justices ranges from that of Andromache Karakatsanis, 14 years, 276 days, to Glenn Joyal, 9 days.

== Justices ==
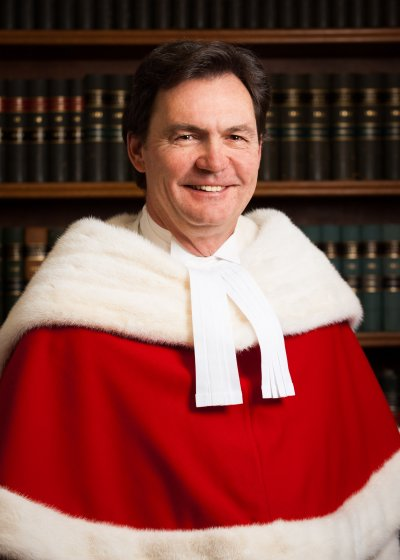
Richard Wagner, the current chief justice (since 2017)

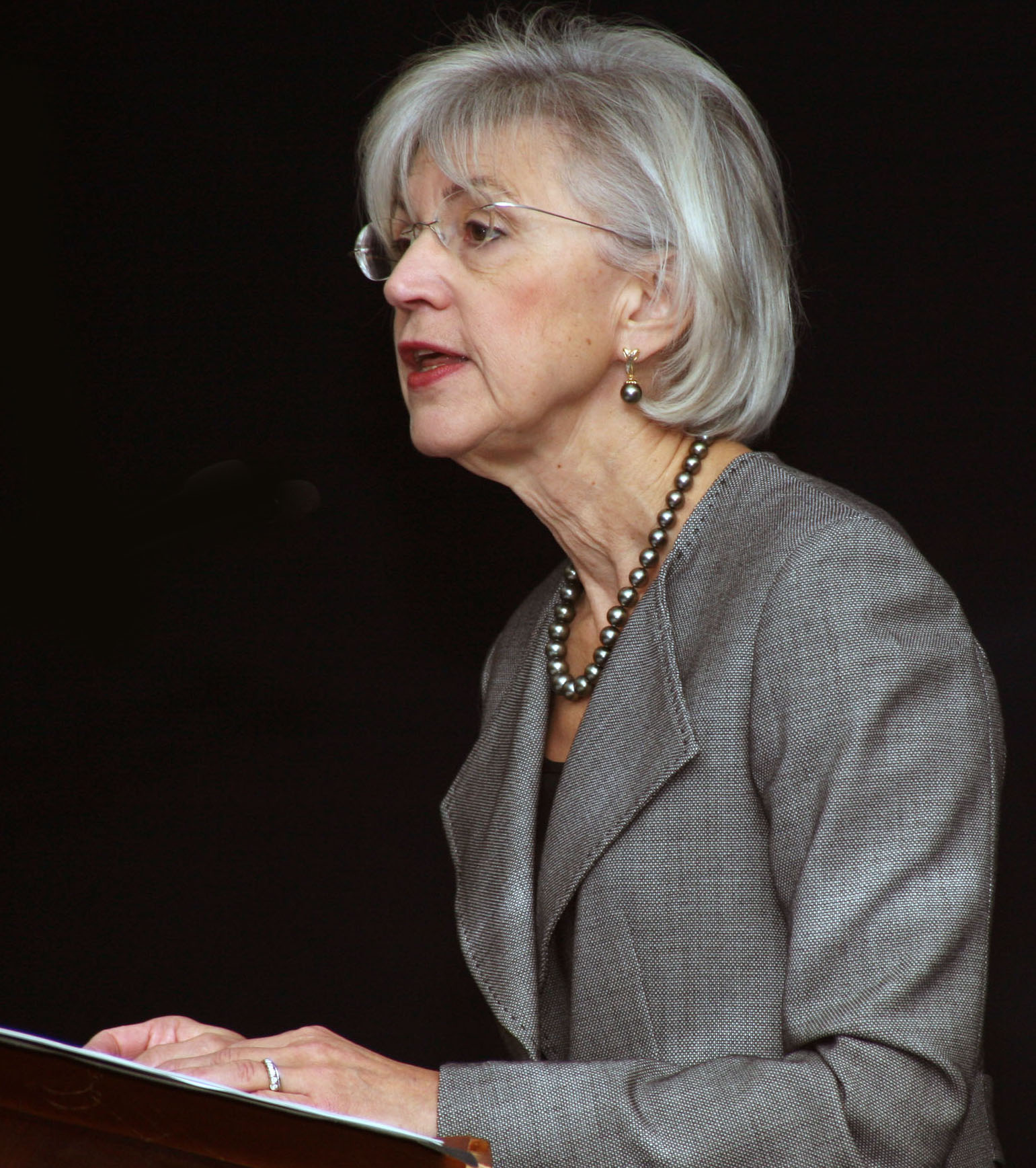
Beverley McLachlin, the first woman to serve as chief justice (2000–2017)

In the table below, the index numbers in the far left column denote the order in which the justices were appointed as a Supreme Court puisne justice (or, as chief justice where the individual was appointed directly as chief justice). Also, a shaded row— —denotes a current justice. Additionally, while many of the justices' positions prior to appointment are simply listed as "lawyer", many had part-time positions, such as teaching, or acted as counsel to various levels of government. The justices of the Supreme Court are:

Justice			Service dates		Service length		Appointed on advice of	Legal education	Prior position
No.	Name (lived)	Province	Overall tenure	Chief justice tenure	Overall tenure	Chief justice tenure	Appointed on advice of	Legal education	Prior position
1	Sir William Buell Richards (1815–1889)	Ontario	September 30, 1875 – January 10, 1879	September 30, 1875 – January 10, 1879	3 years, 102 days	3 years, 102 days	Mackenzie (directly as chief justice)	Articles of clerkship with a senior lawyer (1837)	Chief Justice of the Court of Common Pleas for Canada West
2	William Johnstone Ritchie (1813–1892)	New Brunswick	September 30, 1875 – September 25, 1892	January 11, 1879 – September 25, 1892	16 years, 361 days	13 years, 258 days	Mackenzie (as puisne justice); Macdonald (as chief justice)	Articles of clerkship with a senior lawyer (1837)	Chief Justice of New Brunswick
3	Samuel Henry Strong (1825–1909)	Ontario	September 30, 1875 – November 17, 1902	December 13, 1892 – November 17, 1902	27 years, 48 days	9 years, 339 days	Mackenzie (as puisne justice); Thompson (as chief justice)	Articles of clerkship with a senior lawyer (1849)	Ontario Court of Error & Appeal
4	Jean-Thomas Taschereau (1814–1893)	Quebec	September 30, 1875 – October 6, 1878	—	3 years, 6 days	—	Mackenzie	Articles of clerkship with a senior lawyer; École de droit de Paris (1837)	Court of Queen's Bench of Quebec
5	Télesphore Fournier (1823–1896)	Quebec	September 30, 1875 – September 11, 1895	—	19 years, 346 days	—	Mackenzie	Articles of clerkship with a senior lawyer (1846)	Postmaster General
6	William Alexander Henry (1816–1888)	Nova Scotia	September 30, 1875 – May 3, 1888	—	12 years, 216 days	—	Mackenzie	Articles of clerkship with a senior lawyer (1841)	Lawyer
7	Sir Henri-Elzéar Taschereau (1836–1911)	Quebec	October 7, 1878 – May 1, 1906	November 21, 1902 – May 1, 1906	27 years, 206 days	3 years, 161 days	Mackenzie (as puisne justice); Laurier (as chief justice)	—	Quebec Superior Court
8	John Wellington Gwynne (1814–1902)	Ontario	January 14, 1879 – January 7, 1902	—	22 years, 358 days	—	Macdonald	Articles of clerkship with a senior lawyer (1837)	Ontario Court of Error & Appeal
9	Christopher Salmon Patterson (1823–1893)	Ontario	October 27, 1888 – July 24, 1893	—	4 years, 270 days	—	Macdonald	—	Ontario Court of Error & Appeal
10	Robert Sedgewick (1848–1906)	Nova Scotia	February 18, 1893 – August 4, 1906	—	13 years, 167 days	—	Thompson	Articles of clerkship with a senior lawyer (1872)	Deputy Minister of Justice (Federal)
11	George Edwin King (1839–1901)	New Brunswick	September 21, 1893 – May 8, 1901	—	7 years, 229 days	—	Thompson	Articles of clerkship with a senior lawyer (1865)	Supreme Court of New Brunswick
12	Désiré Girouard (1836–1911)	Quebec	September 28, 1895 – March 22, 1911	—	15 years, 175 days	—	Bowell	McGill Law School (1860)	Member of Parliament for Jacques Cartier
13	Sir Louis Henry Davies (1845–1924)	Prince Edward Island	September 25, 1901 – May 1, 1924	October 23, 1918 – May 1, 1924	22 years, 219 days	5 years, 191 days	Laurier (as puisne justice); Borden (as chief justice)	Inner Temple, London (1866)	Member of Parliament for West Queen's
14	David Mills (1831–1903)	Ontario	February 8, 1902 – May 8, 1903	—	1 year, 89 days	—	Laurier	University of Michigan (1867)	Minister of Justice (Canada) and Leader of the Government in the Senate
15	John Douglas Armour (1830–1903)	Ontario	November 21, 1902 – July 11, 1903	—	232 days	—	Laurier	Articles of clerkship with a senior lawyer (1853)	Chief Justice of Ontario
16	Wallace Nesbitt (1858–1930)	Ontario	May 16, 1903 – October 3, 1905	—	2 years, 140 days	—	Laurier	Articles of clerkship with a senior lawyer (1881)	Lawyer
17	Albert Clements Killam (1849–1908)	Manitoba	August 8, 1903 – February 5, 1905	—	1 year, 181 days	—	Laurier	Articles of clerkship with a senior lawyer (1877)	Chief Justice of Manitoba
18	John Idington (1840–1928)	Ontario	February 10, 1905 – March 30, 1927	—	22 years, 48 days	—	Laurier	University of Toronto (1864)	High Court of Justice of Ontario
19	James Maclennan (1833–1915)	Ontario	October 5, 1905 – February 12, 1909	—	3 years, 130 days	—	Laurier	Articles of clerkship with a senior lawyer (1857)	Court of Appeal for Ontario
20	Sir Charles Fitzpatrick (1853–1942)	Quebec	June 4, 1906 – October 20, 1918	June 4, 1906 – October 20, 1918	12 years, 139 days	12 years, 139 days	Laurier (directly as chief justice)	Université Laval, Faculté de droit (1876)	Minister of Justice (Canada)
21	Sir Lyman Duff (1865–1955)	British Columbia	September 27, 1906 – January 6, 1944	March 17, 1933 – January 6, 1944	37 years, 101 days	10 years, 295 days	Laurier (as puisne justice); Bennett (as chief justice)	Osgoode Hall Law School	Supreme Court of British Columbia
22	Francis Alexander Anglin (1865–1933)	Ontario	February 23, 1909 – February 27, 1933	September 16, 1924 – February 27, 1933	24 years, 4 days	8 years, 164 days	Laurier (as puisne justice); King (as chief justice)	The Law Society of Upper Canada (1888)	High Court of Justice of Ontario (Exchequer Division)
23	Louis-Philippe Brodeur (1862–1924)	Quebec	August 11, 1911 – October 9, 1923	—	12 years, 59 days	—	Laurier	Université Laval à Montréal, Faculté de droit (1884)	Minister of the Naval Service
24	Pierre-Basile Mignault (1854–1945)	Quebec	October 25, 1918 – September 30, 1929	—	10 years, 339 days	—	Borden	McGill Law School (1878)	Member of the International Joint Commission
25	Arthur Cyrille Albert Malouin (1857–1936)	Quebec	January 30, 1924 – September 30, 1924	—	244 days	—	King	Université Laval, Faculté de droit (1882)	Quebec Superior Court
26	Edmund Leslie Newcombe (1859–1931)	Nova Scotia	September 16, 1924 – December 9, 1931	—	7 years, 84 days	—	King	University of Halifax (1881)	Deputy Minister of Justice (federal)
27	Thibaudeau Rinfret (1879–1962)	Quebec	October 1, 1924 – June 21, 1954	January 8, 1944 – June 21, 1954	29 years, 263 days	10 years, 164 days	King (as puisne justice and later as chief justice)	Université Laval à Montréal and McGill Law School (1900)	Quebec Superior Court
28	John Henderson Lamont (1865–1936)	Saskatchewan	April 2, 1927 – March 10, 1936	—	8 years, 343 days	—	King	University of Toronto Faculty of Law (1893)	Court of Appeal for Saskatchewan
29	Robert Smith (1858–1942)	Ontario	May 18, 1927 – December 6, 1933	—	6 years, 202 days	—	King	Articles of clerkship with a senior lawyer (1885)	Supreme Court of Ontario (Appellate Division)
30	Lawrence Arthur Dumoulin Cannon (1877–1939)	Quebec	January 14, 1930 – December 25, 1939	—	9 years, 345 days	—	King	Université Laval, Faculté de droit (1899)	Court of King's Bench for Quebec
31	Oswald Smith Crocket (1868–1945)	New Brunswick	September 21, 1932 – April 12, 1943	—	10 years, 203 days	—	Bennett	Articles of clerkship with a senior lawyer (1892)	Supreme Court of New Brunswick
32	Frank Joseph Hughes (1883–1967)	Ontario	March 17, 1933 – February 12, 1935	—	1 year, 332 days	—	Bennett	Osgoode Hall Law School (Law Society of Upper Canada) (1911)	Lawyer
33	Henry Hague Davis (1885–1944)	Ontario	January 31, 1935 – June 30, 1944	—	9 years, 151 days	—	Bennett	University of Toronto Faculty of Law (1911)	Court of Appeal for Ontario
34	Patrick Kerwin (1889–1963)	Ontario	July 20, 1935 – February 2, 1963	July 1, 1954 – February 2, 1963	27 years, 197 days	8 years, 216 days	Bennett (as puisne justice); St. Laurent (as chief justice)	Osgoode Hall Law School (Law Society of Upper Canada) (1911)	High Court of Justice of Ontario
35	Albert Blellock Hudson (1875–1947)	Manitoba	March 24, 1936 – January 6, 1947	—	10 years, 288 days	—	King	University of Manitoba, Faculty of Law (1898)	Lawyer
36	Robert Taschereau (1896–1970)	Quebec	February 9, 1940 – August 31, 1967	April 22, 1963 – August 31, 1967	27 years, 203 days	4 years, 131 days	King (as puisne justice); Diefenbaker (as chief justice)	Université Laval, Faculté de droit) (1920)	Lawyer
37	Ivan Cleveland Rand (1884–1969)	New Brunswick	April 22, 1943 – April 26, 1959	—	16 years, 4 days	—	King	Harvard Law School (1912)	Lawyer
38	Roy Lindsay Kellock (1893–1975)	Ontario	October 3, 1944 – January 14, 1958	—	13 years, 103 days	—	King	—	Court of Appeal for Ontario
39	James Wilfred Estey (1889–1956)	Saskatchewan	October 6, 1944 – January 22, 1956	—	11 years, 108 days	—	King	Harvard Law School (1915)	Attorney General of Saskatchewan
40	Charles Holland Locke (1887–1980)	British Columbia	June 3, 1947 – September 15, 1962	—	15 years, 104 days	—	King	Articles of clerkship with a senior lawyer (1910)	Lawyer
41	John Robert Cartwright (1895–1979)	Ontario	December 22, 1949 – March 22, 1970	September 1, 1967 – March 22, 1970	20 years, 90 days	2 years, 202 days	St. Laurent (as puisne justice); Pearson (as chief justice)	Osgoode Hall Law School (Law Society of Upper Canada) (1920)	Lawyer
42	Joseph Honoré Gérald Fauteux (1900–1980)	Quebec	December 22, 1949 – December 22, 1973	March 23, 1970 – December 22, 1973	24 years, 0 days	3 years, 274 days	St. Laurent (as puisne justice); P. Trudeau (as chief justice)	Université de Montréal Faculty of Law (1925)	Quebec Superior Court
43	Douglas Charles Abbott (1899–1987)	Quebec	July 1, 1954 – December 22, 1973	—	19 years, 174 days	—	St. Laurent	McGill Law School	Minister of Finance (federal)
44	Henry Grattan Nolan (1893–1957)	Alberta	March 1, 1956 – July 8, 1957	—	1 year, 129 days	—	St. Laurent	Articles of clerkship with a senior lawyer (English and Alberta bars)	Lawyer
45	Ronald Martland (1909–1997)	Alberta	January 15, 1958 – February 9, 1982	—	24 years, 25 days	—	Diefenbaker	University of Alberta, University of Oxford (1928, 1931)	Lawyer
46	Wilfred Judson (1902–1980)	Ontario	February 5, 1958 – July 19, 1977	—	19 years, 164 days	—	Diefenbaker	Osgoode Hall Law School (Law Society of Upper Canada) (1932)	High Court of Justice of Ontario
47	Roland Almon Ritchie (1910–1988)	Nova Scotia	May 5, 1959 – October 30, 1984	—	25 years, 178 days	—	Diefenbaker	University of Oxford (1932)	Lawyer
48	Emmett Matthew Hall (1898–1995)	Saskatchewan	November 23, 1962 – February 28, 1973	—	10 years, 97 days	—	Diefenbaker	University of Saskatchewan College of Law (1919)	Chief Justice of Saskatchewan, Court of Appeal for Saskatchewan
49	Wishart Flett Spence (1904–1998)	Ontario	May 30, 1963 – December 28, 1978	—	15 years, 212 days	—	Pearson	Osgoode Hall Law School (Law Society of Upper Canada) (1928)	High Court of Justice of Ontario
50	Louis-Philippe Pigeon (1905–1986)	Quebec	September 21, 1967 – February 7, 1980	—	12 years, 139 days	—	Pearson	Université Laval, Faculté de droit (1928)	Lawyer
51	Bora Laskin (1912–1984)	Ontario	March 19, 1970 – March 26, 1984	December 27, 1973 – March 26, 1984	14 years, 7 days	10 years, 90 days	P. Trudeau (as puisne justice and later as chief justice)	University of Toronto (1936); Harvard Law School (1937); Osgoode Hall Law School (Law Society of Upper Canada) (1937)	Court of Appeal for Ontario
52	Robert George Brian Dickson (1916–1998)	Manitoba	March 26, 1973 – June 29, 1990	April 18, 1984 – June 29, 1990	17 years, 95 days	6 years, 72 days	P. Trudeau (as puisne justice and later as chief justice)	University of Manitoba Faculty of Law (1938)	Manitoba Court of Appeal
53	Jean Beetz (1927–1991)	Quebec	January 1, 1974 – November 9, 1988	—	14 years, 313 days	—	P. Trudeau	Université de Montréal Faculty of Law (1950); Pembroke College, Oxford (1953)	Quebec Court of Appeal
54	Louis-Philippe de Grandpré (1917–2008)	Quebec	January 1, 1974 – September 30, 1977	—	3 years, 272 days	—	P. Trudeau	McGill University Faculty of Law	President of the Canadian Bar Association
55	Willard Zebedee Estey (1919–2002)	Ontario	September 29, 1977 – April 21, 1988	—	10 years, 205 days	—	P. Trudeau	University of Saskatchewan College of Law	Chief Justice of Ontario
56	Yves Pratte (1925–1988)	Quebec	October 1, 1977 – June 29, 1979	—	1 year, 271 days	—	P. Trudeau	Université Laval (Faculté de droit (Université Laval)) and University of Toronto	Chairman of Air Canada
57	William Rogers McIntyre (1918–2009)	British Columbia	January 1, 1979 – February 14, 1989	—	10 years, 44 days	—	P. Trudeau	University of Saskatchewan	British Columbia Court of Appeal
58	Julien Chouinard (1929–1987)	Quebec	September 24, 1979 – February 6, 1987	—	7 years, 135 days	—	Clark	Université Laval	Quebec Court of Appeal
59	Antonio Lamer (1933–2007)	Quebec	March 28, 1980 – January 6, 2000	July 1, 1990 – January 6, 2000	19 years, 284 days	9 years, 189 days	P. Trudeau (as puisne justice); Mulroney (as chief justice)	Université de Montréal	Quebec Court of Appeal
60	Bertha Wilson (1923–2007)	Ontario	March 4, 1982 – January 3, 1991	—	8 years, 305 days	—	P. Trudeau	Dalhousie Law School	Court of Appeal for Ontario
61	Gerald Eric Le Dain (1924–2007)	Ontario	May 29, 1984 – November 29, 1988	—	4 years, 184 days	—	P. Trudeau	McGill University Faculty of Law	Federal Court of Appeal
62	Gérard La Forest (1926–2025)	New Brunswick	January 16, 1985 – September 29, 1997	—	12 years, 256 days	—	Mulroney	University of New Brunswick Faculty of Law and Yale Law School	New Brunswick Court of Appeal
63	Claire L'Heureux-Dubé (b. 1927)	Quebec	April 15, 1987 – June 30, 2002	—	15 years, 76 days	—	Mulroney	Université Laval (Faculté de droit (Université Laval))	Quebec Court of Appeal
64	John Sopinka (1933–1997)	Ontario	May 24, 1988 – November 24, 1997	—	9 years, 184 days	—	Mulroney	University of Toronto	Lawyer
65	Charles Gonthier (1928–2009)	Quebec	February 1, 1989 – July 31, 2003	—	14 years, 180 days	—	Mulroney	McGill University Faculty of Law	Quebec Court of Appeal
66	Peter Cory (1925–2020)	Ontario	February 1, 1989 – May 31, 1999	—	10 years, 119 days	—	Mulroney	Osgoode Hall Law School	Court of Appeal for Ontario
67	Beverley McLachlin (b. 1943)	British Columbia	March 30, 1989 – December 14, 2017	January 7, 2000 – December 14, 2017	28 years, 259 days	17 years, 341 days	Mulroney (as puisne justice); Chrétien (as chief justice)	University of Alberta Faculty of Law	Chief Justice of the Supreme Court of British Columbia
68	William Stevenson (1934–2021)	Alberta	September 17, 1990 – June 4, 1992	—	1 year, 261 days	—	Mulroney	University of Alberta Faculty of Law	Court of Appeal of Alberta; Court of Appeal for the Northwest Territories
69	Frank Iacobucci (b. 1937)	Ontario	January 7, 1991 – June 30, 2004	—	13 years, 175 days	—	Mulroney	University of British Columbia and Faculty of Law, University of Cambridge	Chief Justice of the Federal Court of Canada
70	John C. Major (b. 1931)	Alberta	November 13, 1992 – December 24, 2005	—	13 years, 41 days	—	Mulroney	University of Toronto	Court of Appeal of Alberta
71	Michel Bastarache (b. 1947)	New Brunswick	September 30, 1997 – June 30, 2008	—	10 years, 274 days	—	Chrétien	University of Ottawa Faculty of Law	New Brunswick Court of Appeal
72	William Ian Corneil Binnie (b. 1939)	Ontario	January 8, 1998 – October 20, 2011	—	13 years, 285 days	—	Chrétien	Faculty of Law, University of Cambridge University of Toronto	Lawyer
73	Louise Arbour (b. 1947)	Ontario	September 15, 1999 – June 30, 2004	—	4 years, 289 days	—	Chrétien	Université de Montréal Faculty of Law; University of Ottawa Faculty of Law	Chief Prosecutor for the International Criminal Tribunal for the former Yugoslavia and for Rwanda
74	Louis LeBel (1939–2023)	Quebec	January 7, 2000 – November 29, 2014	—	14 years, 326 days	—	Chrétien	Université Laval; University of Toronto	Quebec Court of Appeal
75	Marie Deschamps (b. 1952)	Quebec	August 7, 2002 – August 6, 2012	—	9 years, 365 days	—	Chrétien	Université de Montréal; McGill University Faculty of Law	Quebec Court of Appeal
76	Morris J. Fish (b. 1938)	Quebec	August 5, 2003 – August 30, 2013	—	10 years, 25 days	—	Chrétien	McGill University Faculty of Law	Quebec Court of Appeal
77	Rosalie Abella (b. 1946)	Ontario	August 30, 2004 – July 1, 2021	—	16 years, 304 days	—	Martin	University of Toronto	Court of Appeal for Ontario
78	Louise Charron (b. 1951)	Ontario	August 30, 2004 – August 29, 2011	—	6 years, 364 days	—	Martin	University of Ottawa Faculty of Law	Court of Appeal for Ontario
79	Marshall Rothstein (b. 1940)	Manitoba	March 1, 2006 – August 30, 2015	—	9 years, 182 days	—	Harper	University of Manitoba	Federal Court of Appeal
80	Thomas Cromwell (b. 1952)	Nova Scotia	December 22, 2008 – August 31, 2016	—	7 years, 253 days	—	Harper	Queen's University Faculty of Law; University of Oxford	Nova Scotia Court of Appeal
81	Michael J. Moldaver (b. 1947)	Ontario	October 21, 2011 – August 31, 2022	—	10 years, 314 days	—	Harper	University of Toronto	Court of Appeal for Ontario
82	Andromache Karakatsanis (b. 1955) (Note: Age 70, mandatory retirement date: October 3, 2030)	Ontario	October 21, 2011 – present	—	14 years, 276 days	—	Harper	Osgoode Hall Law School	Court of Appeal for Ontario
83	Richard Wagner (b. 1957) (Note: Age 69, mandatory retirement date: April 2, 2032)	Quebec	October 5, 2012 – present	December 18, 2017 – present	13 years, 292 days	8 years, 218 days	Harper (as puisne justice); J. Trudeau (as chief justice)	University of Ottawa Faculty of Law	Quebec Court of Appeal
84	Clément Gascon (b. 1960)	Quebec	Jun 9, 2014 – Sept 15, 2019	—	5 years, 98 days	—	Harper	McGill University Faculty of Law	Quebec Court of Appeal
85	Suzanne Côté (b. 1958) (Note: Age 67, mandatory retirement date: September 21, 2033)	Quebec	December 1, 2014 – present	—	11 years, 235 days	—	Harper	Laval University	Lawyer
86	Russell Brown (b. 1965)	Alberta	August 31, 2015 – June 12, 2023	—	7 years, 285 days	—	Harper	University of Victoria; University of Toronto	Court of Appeal of Alberta
87	Malcolm Rowe (b. 1953) (Note: Age 73, mandatory retirement date: June 27, 2028)	Newfoundland and Labrador	October 28, 2016 – present	—	9 years, 269 days	—	J. Trudeau	Osgoode Hall Law School	Supreme Court of Newfoundland and Labrador (Court of Appeal)
88	Sheilah Martin (b. 1956)	Alberta	December 18, 2017 – May 30, 2026	—	8 years, 163 days	—	J. Trudeau	McGill University Faculty of Law; University of Alberta Faculty of Law	Court of Appeal of Alberta; Court of Appeal for the Northwest Territories; Court of Appeal of Nunavut
89	Nicholas Kasirer (b. 1960) (Note: Age 66, mandatory retirement date: February 20, 2035)	Quebec	September 16, 2019 – present	—	6 years, 311 days	—	J. Trudeau	McGill University Faculty of Law; University of Paris 1 Pantheon-Sorbonne	Quebec Court of Appeal
90	Mahmud Jamal (b. 1967) (Note: Age 59, mandatory retirement date: July 20, 2042)	Ontario	July 1, 2021 – present	—	5 years, 23 days	—	J. Trudeau	McGill University Faculty of Law; Yale Law School	Court of Appeal for Ontario
91	Michelle O'Bonsawin (b. 1974) (Note: Age 52; mandatory retirement May 2, 2049)	Ontario	September 1, 2022 – present	—	3 years, 326 days	—	J. Trudeau	University of Ottawa (Faculty of Law) (LLB & PhD); York University (Osgoode Hall) (LLM)	Ontario Superior Court of Justice
92	Mary Moreau (b. 1955 or 1956) (Note: Age 69–70; mandatory retirement 2030/2031)	Alberta	November 6, 2023 – present	—	2 years, 260 days	—	J. Trudeau	University of Alberta (Faculty of Law) (LLB) Université de Sherbrooke (Civil Code of Québec study program)	Court of King's Bench of Alberta
93	Glenn Joyal	Manitoba	July 15, 2026 – present	—	9 days	—	Carney	McGill Faculty of Law (LLB)	Court of King's Bench of Manitoba

== Timeline of justices ==
This graphical timeline depicts the progression of the justices on the Supreme Court. Information regarding each justice's predecessors, successors and fellow justices, as well as their tenure on the court can be gleaned (and comparisons between justices drawn) from it. There are no formal names or numbers for the individual seats of the puisne justices.

Colour key:
Chief justice

== Justices' birthplaces ==
Place	No.	Justices
Canada (81): (Note: At least one Supreme Court justice has been born in each of Canada's current ten provinces; none however, have been born in its current territories (the Northwest Territories, Nunavut, and Yukon).)
Alberta (Note: Includes territory previously in the Northwest Territories prior to 1905)	4	McLachlin; Moreau; Nolan; Stevenson
British Columbia	2	Brown; Iacobucci
Manitoba	3	Joyal; Locke; Rothstein
New Brunswick	6	Anglin; Crocket; J. W. Estey; King; La Forest; Rand
Newfoundland and Labrador	1	Rowe
Nova Scotia	5	Henry; Killam; Newcombe; R. A. Richie; W. J. Ritchie
Ontario (Note: Includes the former colony of Upper Canada, and Canada West in the former Province of Canada)	24	Armour; Cartwright; Charron; Cory; Cromwell; Davis; Duff; Hudson; Hughes; Idington; Karakatsanis; Kellock; Kerwin; Lamont; Laskin; Maclennan; Major; Mills; Moldaver; Nesbitt; O'Bonsawin; Richards; Smith; Spence
Prince Edward Island	1	Davies
Quebec (Note: Includes the former colony of Lower Canada, and Canada East in the former Province of Canada)	34	Abbott; Arbour; Bastarache; Beetz; Binnie; Brodeur; Cannon; Chouinard; Côté; de Grandpré; Deschamps; Fauteux; Fish; Fitzpatrick; Fournier; Gascon; Girouard; Gonthier; Hall; Kasirer; Lamer; Le Dain; LeBel; L'Heureux-Dubé; Malouin; Martin; McIntyre; Pigeon; Pratte; Rinfret; H.-E. Taschereau; J.-T. Taschereau; R. Taschereau; Wagner
Saskatchewan	3	Dickson; W. Z. Estey; Sopinka
United Kingdom (7):
England	4	Judson; Martland; Patterson; Strong
Scotland	2	Sedgewick; Wilson
Ireland (Note: Includes all of Ireland as part of the United Kingdom, prior to 1922)	1	Gwynne
United States (1):
Massachusetts	1	Mignault
Germany (1):
Baden-Württemberg	1	Abella
Kenya (1):
Nairobi	1	Jamal
Total: 92

== Justices' legal backgrounds ==
Of the 92 justices who have served on the court, 50 had previously served on provincial appellate courts, although not all of these were serving in that capacity immediately prior to their appointment (e.g. Beverley McLachlin had served on the British Columbia Court of Appeal before being named Chief Justice of the Supreme Court of British Columbia; Louise Arbour had served on the Court of Appeal for Ontario before being named Chief Prosecutor of the International Criminal Tribunals for Rwanda and the former Yugoslavia). Three served on the appellate division of the Federal Court of Canada: Frank Iacobucci as Chief Justice of the Court, and Gerald Le Dain and Marshall Rothstein as appellate justices.

Twenty-eight justices were named to the Supreme Court directly from the bar without having previously served as judges, including one Chief Justice (Charles Fitzpatrick). Of those, eleven had served or were serving in various federal government capacities, including member of Parliament, cabinet minister, or deputy minister, prior to their appointment. A further 12 served on provincial superior trial courts.

Of the 34 justices appointed since 1980, only three had no prior judicial experience: John Sopinka, Ian Binnie and Suzanne Côté.

== Bibliography ==
- James G. Snell; Frederick Vaughan (1985). The Supreme Court of Canada: History of the Institution. University of Toronto Press. ISBN 0802034179.
- Peter McCormick (2000). Supreme at Last: The Evolution of the Supreme Court of Canada. James Lorimer & Company. ISBN 1550286927.
- Donald R. Songer (2008). The Transformation of the Supreme Court of Canada: An Empirical Examination. University of Toronto Press. ISBN 978-0802096890.
