= Strong Court =

Period of the Supreme Court of Canada from 1892 to 1902

Supreme Court of Canada
Strong Court
- Ritchie Court ← → Taschereau Court (1902–1906)
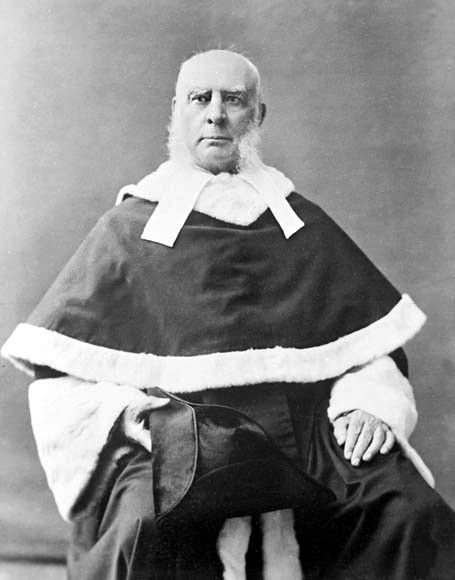
- Samuel Henry Strong in 1895
- December 13, 1892 – November 18, 1902 (9 years, 340 days)
- Seat: Second Supreme Court of Canada building
- No. of positions: 6

The Strong Court was the period in the history of the Supreme Court of Canada from 1892 to 1902, during which Samuel Henry Strong served as Chief Justice of Canada. Strong succeeded William Johnstone Ritchie as chief justice after the latter's death, and held the position until his retirement on November 18, 1902.

The Strong Court, much like all iterations of the Supreme Court prior to 1949, was largely overshadowed by the Judicial Committee of the Privy Council, which served as the highest court of appeal in Canada, and whose decisions on Canadian appeals were binding on all Canadian courts.

The Strong Court continued to face many of the same criticisms previously directed at its predecessor, the Ritchie Court, including concerns about the conduct of its justices, the excessive length and lack of clarity in its rulings, and significant delays in the publication of their decisions.

== Membership ==
The Supreme Court Act, 1875 established the Supreme Court of Canada, composed of six justices, two of whom were allocated to Quebec under law, in recognition of the province's unique civil law system. (Note: The Supreme and Exchequer Court Act, S.C. 1875, c. 11 (The Supreme and Exchequer Court Act at Canadiana)) Early appointments to the court reflected an unwritten regional balance, with two justices from Ontario and two from the Maritimes. There was no representation from the western territories or British Columbia.

On September 25, 1892, Chief Justice William Johnstone Ritchie died at the age of 78 after a relapse of bronchitis. Early speculation suggested that Prime Minister John Abbott might appoint Justice Minister John Sparrow David Thompson as chief justice. At the time, there was a widely held view that the position should not automatically go to the court's longest-serving member. Prominent Conservative senator James Robert Gowan, a key party advisor on legal matters, strongly opposed this possibility. Gowan wrote to Justice Minister Thompson suggesting that Justice Strong be allowed to retire and that the appointment be delayed. He also expressed a lack of confidence in Strong's work ethic. However, three weeks after becoming prime minister, Thompson appointed Strong as the court's third chief justice.

Justices from the Ritchie Court who continued into the Strong Court included Télésphore Fournier and Henri-Elzéar Taschereau from Quebec; as well as John Wellington Gwynne and Christopher Salmon Patterson of Ontario.

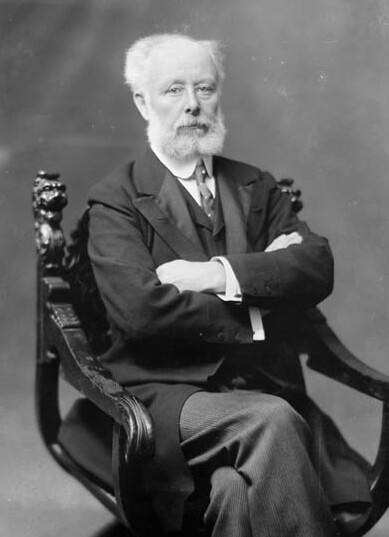
Appointed in 1901, Louis Henry Davies is the only Justice in the history of the Supreme Court appointed from Prince Edward Island.

On February 18, 1893, Prime Minister Thompson appointed Robert Sedgewick, Deputy Minister of Justice and a Nova Scotia lawyer, to the Supreme Court to replace the sole Maritimer, chief justice Ritchie. Sedgewick specialized in equity law, lectured at Dalhousie Law School, and was notably young at the time of his appointment, at age 44.

Justice Christopher Salmon Patterson died on July 24, 1893, and was replaced a few months later, on September 21, by George Edwin King, a former premier of New Brunswick and a justice of the Court of Queen's Bench of New Brunswick. King specialized in commercial and criminal law and was described by chief justice Strong as "probably the best commercial lawyer in the Dominion." The appointment of King, a second Maritimer, to replace the Ontario-based Patterson drew criticism amid ongoing concerns about the lack of representation for Western Canada. King had previously been considered a suitable candidate for the Supreme Court as early as 1888.

=== Growing political involvement in the court's composition ===
During the Strong Court era, the conservative government grew concerned about the increasing age and frequent absences of several justices. At the time, there was no mandatory retirement age. In 1894, the House of Commons passed a motion permitting any justice of the Supreme Court who had reached the age of 70, with at least 15 years of judicial service and five years on the Supreme Court, to retire with a lifetime pension equal to their salary. When this failed to prompt the retirement of Justices Gwynne and Fournier, Justice Minister Charles Tupper wrote to chief justice Strong to inform him that he would ask both justices to retire or introduce a bill in Parliament to compel their retirement. Tupper also asked the court registrar to provide information on the age, attendance, and delayed cases associated with Gwynne and Fournier, though the Registrar provided only a narrow response to the request. Chief Justice Strong was described as "going out of his way" to support and cooperate with Tupper's initiative.

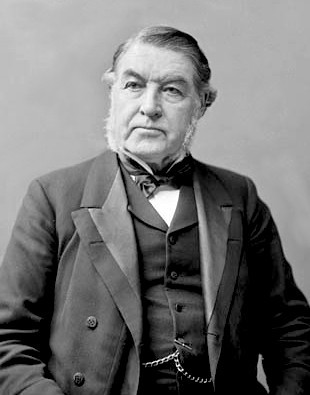
As justice minister and prime minister, Charles Tupper sought to reshape the court by removing the older justices.

Justice Strong replied to Tupper, stating that he did not believe a pension would be sufficient to encourage the retirement of Gwynne or Fournier. Instead, he recommended instituting a mandatory retirement age of 80. Emboldened by Strong's support, Tupper contacted Gwynne and Fournier to request their retirement. Fournier agreed to retire following a leave of absence. Gwynne also reportedly agreed to retire but remained on the bench after the Conservative government failed to identify a suitable replacement.

Justice Télésphore Fournier retired from the court on September 12, 1895, and was succeeded by Désiré Girouard, a former Conservative Member of Parliament and mayor of Dorval, Quebec. Girouard was an author and contributor to legal journals and had been critical of the Supreme Court during his time in Parliament. He had not previously served as a judge and had declined appointments to lower courts, but was praised for his role in addressing the McGreevy-Langevin scandal in Parliament.

When the Liberal government under Prime Minister Wilfrid Laurier came to power in 1896, it adopted a more cautious approach to changing the Supreme Court's membership. This caution persisted despite calls from the Ontario and Quebec Bars for the removal of Justices Strong and Gwynne. Laurier prepared for vacancies by identifying willing nominees in advance, allowing for swift appointments when the opportunity arose. Although David Mills had been selected to succeed Gwynne, the Liberals chose not to pressure or entice Gwynne into retirement, which frustrated Mills.

George Edwin King died on May 7, 1901, and was succeeded in September of that year by Louis Henry Davies, a former Liberal Premier of Prince Edward Island, Member of Parliament, Senator, and Cabinet member in the Laurier's government. Davies became the only justice in the court's history from Prince Edward Island. Despite his high political profile, Davies had little legal experience, having practiced law for only five years before entering politics. His patronage appointment was attributed to his service to the Liberal Party and drew criticism from the legal community.

John Wellington Gwynne had reportedly agreed to retire in 1896, but when the Conservative government failed to find a suitable replacement, he agreed to remain on the court. After the Laurier government came to power, it identified David Mills, a Liberal Member of Parliament and Senator from Ontario, as Gwynne's successor. However, the Laurier declined to pressure Gwynne into retirement. Gwynne died on January 7, 1902, and Mills was appointed to the court on February 8, 1902. Mills lacked significant legal experience, having only begun practising law in the 1880s despite graduating from law school in 1855. His appointment was widely regarded as a patronage reward from Laurier. Mills had long been promised a seat on the Supreme Court and had actively interfered with the appointment of other judges to preserve his place. He also refused offers of appointment to lower courts and government positions. His appointment drew sharp criticism for his age which he was already 71, limited legal practice, and the overtly political nature of his selection.

On November 18, 1902, the Strong Court came to an end when Chief Justice Strong resigned from the court after Justice Minister Charles Fitzpatrick arranged for him to receive both his judicial pension and a salary as chair of a commission to revise and consolidate the statutes of Canada.

=== Timeline ===
Bar key:
Mackenzie appointee Macdonald appointee Thompson appointee Bowell appointee Laurier appointee

== Other branches of government ==
The Strong Court began during the 7th Canadian Parliament, under a majority government led by Conservative Prime Minister John Abbott. Abbott was succeeded by Conservative John Sparrow David Thompson, who served from 1892 until his death in 1894. Mackenzie Bowell was named prime minister, serving until 1896, when Charles Tupper briefly assumed the role for 69-days. Tupper was succeeded by Liberal leader Wilfrid Laurier, who won the 1896 general election.

The Strong Court overlapped with two general elections, in 1896 and 1900, both of which resulted in majority victories for Wilfrid Laurier's Liberals.

== Relationship with the Judicial Committee of the Privy Council ==
From 1867 to 1949, the Judicial Committee of the Privy Council served as the highest court of appeal in Canada, and its decisions on Canadian appeals were binding on all Canadian courts. After the creation of the Supreme Court of Canada, it remained possible—if both parties consented—for appeals to proceed directly from a provincial court of appeal to the Judicial Committee, bypassing the Supreme Court entirely. By 1900, the Privy Council had become dominant in Canadian jurisprudence, often deciding Canadian cases with "little or no restraint or respect" for the decisions of the Canadian courts from which the appeals originated. During the Strong Court, 5.1 per cent of decisions of the Supreme Court were appealed to the Privy Council.

Many important cases continued to bypass the Supreme Court from provincial courts of appeal. In Cunningham v Homma, the Privy Council upheld a British Columbia law that prohibited Japanese Canadians and Chinese Canadians from voting in provincial elections.

In 1895, the Parliament of the United Kingdom amended the constituting documents of the Judicial Committee to allow the Queen to summon a limited number of justices from the colonies. In 1897, Chief Justice Strong became the first Canadian justice to sit on the Judicial Committee. As the position was unpaid, the Canadian government provided Strong with a $1,000 travel allowance. He attended the Committee from 1897 to 1900, remained a member until his death in 1909, sat on 28 reported appeals, and authored eight decisions. Some of these significant decisions include:

- The City of Winnipeg v Barrett (1892): on the Manitoba Schools Question. The Supreme Court of Canada unanimously overturned the decision of the Court of Queen's Bench of Manitoba, and struck down legislation that effectively ended the official status of the French language. However, the Privy Council overturned the Supreme Court's decision, restoring the legislation.
- Reference Re Manitoba Education Statutes (1894): on the Manitoba Schools Question. In a 3–2 majority, the Supreme Court of Canada held that there was no right of appeal under section 93 of the Constitution Act, 1867 or the Manitoba Act to the federal government, and that remedial orders could therefore not be issued. As counsel for Manitoba refused to appear before the court, the Chief Justice appointed Christopher Robinson as amicus curiae to present Manitoba's position. (Note: In Re Statutes of Manitoba relating to Education, 1894 CanLII 80, (1894) 22 SCR 577, Supreme Court (Canada)) The Privy Council overturned the Supreme Court's decision, holding that a right of appeal did exist under the Manitoba Act. (Note: Brophy and others v The Attorney General of Manitoba (Canada) [1895] UKPC 1, [1895] AC 202 (on appeal from Canada))
- Local Prohibition Case (1896): on core principles of the federal peace, order and good government power. In a pair of companion cases, the Supreme Court of Canada delivered conflicting decisions on the validity of an Ontario prohibition law—first upholding it under the double aspect doctrine, and in the subsequent case declaring it ultra vires. (Note: Hudson v Township of South Norwich, 1893 CanLII 2, (1893) 21 SCR 669, Supreme Court (Canada)) (Note: In re Prohibitory Liquor Laws, 1895 CanLII 95, (1895) 24 SCR 170, Supreme Court (Canada)) The Privy Council ultimately held that the provincial legislation was valid. (Note: The Attorney General for Ontario v The Attorney General for the Dominion of Canada, and the Distillers and Brewers' Association of Ontario [1896] UKPC 20, [1897] AC 199 (9 May 1896), P.C. (on appeal from Canada)) The decision marked the end of the centralized, Macdonaldian view of the Constitution.
- Provincial Fisheries Reference (1898): on jurisdictional boundaries of property rights in relation to rivers, lakes, harbors, and fisheries.

== Rulings of the court ==
The Strong Court heard 875 cases between 1892 and 1902, averaging 87.5 cases per year—significantly more than the preceding Ritchie Court. During this period, 55.3 per cent of appeals resulted in the lower court's decision being affirmed, while 31.8 per cent were overturned. There was also a reduced tendency to appeal Supreme Court decisions to the Judicial Committee of the Privy Council, with only 43 such appeals in the 1890s—representing just 4.8 per cent of the court's decisions. Significant rulings include:

- Jellett v Wilkie (1896): on creditor interests in real property. The court established the rule in Western provinces that an execution creditor can only sell the property of his debtor subject to all such charges, liens and equities as the same was subject to in the hands of his debtor. (Note: Jellett v Wilkie, 1896 CanLII 49, (1896) 26 SCR 282, Supreme Court (Canada))
- McCleave v City of Moncton (1902): on potential municipal liability for police negligence. The court held that police officers investigating a crime occupied a public office defined by the common law and statute, but are not members of the executive government. (Note: McCleave v City of Moncton, 1902 CanLII 73, (1902) 32 SCR 106, Supreme Court (Canada))

== Administration of the court ==
The court operated with a panel of six judges, meaning that if there was an equal division (3—3), the appeal would be dismissed. It was also common for each justice to write their own individual reasons for judgment rather than issuing joint judgments. This practice, prevalent in the 1880s, continued into the 1890s. Combined with the frequent dismissal of appeals due to tied votes, the court's practice made it difficult to establish clear legal precedents or to discern whether a coordinated judicial approach existed. As a result, the court primarily resolved disputes by applying existing legal principles, rather than by setting new legal standards. Under the Supreme Court Act, the court held three sessions per year.

Although there were compelling reasons to expand the number of justices, such as avoiding quorum issues and ensuring representation for the growing western provinces, the governments of the time did not appear to seriously consider expanding the court. In 1896, Parliament passed a bill lowering the court’s quorum to four justices. Attempts to allow federal or provincial court justices to sit as ad hoc members failed in negotiations or were withdrawn from Parliament.

In its early years, the court did not sit at a traditional shared bench. Instead, each of the six justices had individual desks. Historians Snell and Vaughan note that this setup coincided with a period in the 1880s marked by deep divisions within the court and a lack of "consultation and cooperation" among the justices. The 1890s saw the introduction of judicial conferences, but their effectiveness was limited, as Justice Gwynne refused to participate. There is evidence that some justices circulated draft judgments for discussion and engaged in private deliberations. Nevertheless, the resulting judgments often gave the impression that there was little communication among the justices.

The court recognized the right of applicants from Quebec to use either English or French. While French-language materials were accepted, they were translated into English at the court's expense. The Supreme Court Act required the court to publish its own decisions rather than relying on private law reporters, an innovation not found elsewhere in the British Empire. This self-publishing model was intended to ensure that decisions would quickly reach legal professionals and lower court judges. Judgments published in the Supreme Court Reports were printed in the language in which they were delivered and were not translated. Despite its promise, the Supreme Court Reports continued to face criticism for numerous shortcomings, including errors, inconsistent editing and citations, a lack of uniform style, poorly written headnotes, and delays from decision to date of publication.

=== Changes to the structure and jurisdiction of the court ===
In 1892, Parliament passed the Criminal Code, (Note: The Criminal Code, 1892, S.C. 1892, c. 29, s. 742, 743 (The Criminal Code, 1892 at HathiTrust)) which limited the Supreme Court's jurisdiction over criminal matters. Specifically, it restricted appeals from decisions of provincial courts of appeal to cases where the conviction was affirmed and a dissenting opinion was issued by the appellate panel. This limitation appeared to contradict the original intent of having the Supreme Court play a significant role in shaping a uniform Canadian criminal law.

In April 1896, under the Conservative government of Prime Minister Mackenzie Bowell, Parliament amended the Supreme and Exchequer Courts Act to create the title "Chief Justice of Canada." (Note: An Act further to amend the Supreme and Exchequer Courts Act, S.C. 1896, c. 14 (An Act further to amend the Supreme and Exchequer Courts Act at Canadiana)) Prior to this amendment, the position was simply referred to as "chief justice." (Note: The Supreme and Exchequer Court Act, S.C. 1875, c. 11, s. 3 (The Supreme and Exchequer Court Act at Canadiana))

With the court's formation in 1875, there was a minimum controversy value of $2,000 (equivalent to $58,293 in 2023) for a civil appeal to be heard from Quebec to prevent frivolous appeals; however, no minimum existed in any other jurisdiction. In 1897, legislative amendments required a minimum controversy value of $1,000 (equivalent to $45,249 in 2023) for appeals from Ontario, (Note: An Act respecting the Supreme Court of Ontario and the Judges thereof, S.C. 1897, c. 34, s. 1) and in 1902, a minimum of $2,000 (equivalent to $73,969 in 2023) was set for appeals from the Yukon. In a 1900 appeal from the Nova Scotia over $80, Justice Taschereau noted "The Maritime Provinces enjoy the costly privilege of bringing appeals to this court upon such paltry amounts ... That such appeals should be possible is a blot upon the administration of justice." (Note: Kent v Ellis, 1900 CanLII 86, (1900) 31 SCR 110, Supreme Court (Canada))

=== Inter-personal issues of the court ===
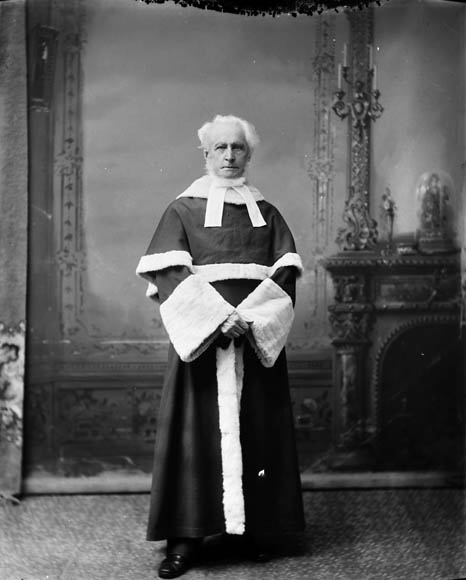
Justice John Wellington Gwynne had a poor relationship with Chief Justice Strong, who actively sought Gwynne's removal from the court on several occasions.

The court under Chief Justice Strong was marked by several interpersonal conflicts, including a strained relationship with Justice Gwynne.

During his time as a puisne justice, Strong became increasingly disillusioned with the court and offered his resignation to Prime Minister John A. Macdonald on several occasions between 1884 and 1888. Although Macdonald eventually accepted his resignation in 1888, Strong ultimately did not follow through with it.

As chief justice, Strong actively supported Justice Minister Charles Tupper's efforts to compel the retirement of justices Gwynne and Fournier. While he spoke positively of Fournier's character and his knowledge of civil law, he noted that Fournier was frequently on leave due to Bright's disease and unlikely to attend the court's upcoming session. In contrast, Strong was critical of Justice Gwynne, particularly his personality and approach to working with colleagues on the bench. In 1901, a lawyer filed assault charges against Chief Justice Strong, alleging that he used violent language in the courtroom and later assaulted the lawyer in a hallway. Strong denied the allegations, and the government chose to ignore the matter.

In 1889, Justice Taschereau offered to draft a Criminal Code for the government, but his proposal was rejected. Instead, the government, led in part by future justice Robert Sedgewick, produced its own draft, which Parliament passed in 1892. Taschereau later publicly criticized the legislation in a letter to the Attorney General, which he made public, describing the Code as poorly drafted, incomplete, and missing several offences. Despite this public disagreement, historians Snell and Vaughan noted there appeared to be no evidence of ongoing animosity between Taschereau and Sedgewick when they served together.

=== Poor administration of the court ===
Historians Snell and Vaughan note that Justice Strong had one of the poorest work ethics on the court. Prior to his appointment as chief justice, the court registrar visited Strong at home and threatened to withhold publication of his decisions in order to compel him to complete his work. Senator James Robert Gowan also criticized Strong's poor work ethic before his appointment and reminded Prime Minister Thompson of Strong's earlier, repeated attempts to resign from the court.

Strong often preferred to deliver oral judgments from the bench without issuing written reasons, a practice Snell and Vaughan described as lazy, leaving lawyers and lower court judges without guidance or explanation. (Note: Fraser v Drew, 1900 CanLII 82, [1900] 30 SCR 241, Supreme Court (Canada)) In one case, Strong delivered a majority oral opinion dismissing an appeal based solely on a single cited case and offered no reasoning, in contrast the dissenting opinion by Justice Gwynne extended to 20 pages. (Note: Ontario Mining Company v Seybold, 1901 CanLII 80, [1901] 32 SCR 1, Supreme Court (Canada))

Hearings before the court were also criticized for the justices' frequent interruptions of counsel, to the point where a law journal observed that it was possible that arguments could not be fairly presented to the court. Justices often conversed among themselves during hearings, and the Chief Justice refused to allow counsel to read excerpts from the record. This practice was viewed as especially unfair by Quebec lawyers, who found it difficult to explain civil law principles to a bench primarily trained in the common law.

=== Costs and salaries of the court ===
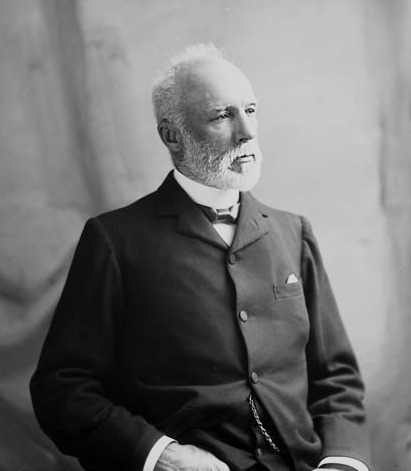
Justice Henri-Elzéar Taschereau filled the role of chief justice during Chief Justice Strong's many health related leaves of absence.

Judicial salaries became a public issue in the 1890s, highlighting the importance of alternative income sources, especially as the government sought to encourage justices to retire. For instance, Justice Gwynne served until his death in office at the age of 87. In 1897, Justice Taschereau requested increased compensation due to the additional responsibilities he assumed during Chief Justice Strong's medical absences. Strong himself only retired after securing both his judicial pension and a salaried position as chair of a commission to revise and consolidate the statutes of Canada.

Salary concerns were longstanding. During the 1880s, Supreme Court justices received an annual salary of $7,000 (equivalent to $230,111 in 2023), with the chief justice receiving an additional $1,000. Even at the time, this was considered low, and rumours circulated that all the justices, except for Chief Justice Ritchie, had taken several months' salary in advance as loans from banks. In the 1890s, Supreme Court justices were the third lowest-paid in the British Empire, ahead of only Tasmania and Natal. The Colony of Victoria offered judicial salaries nearly twice that of Canada's Supreme Court. Pensions were also lacking, offering little security and no protections for widows.

The cost of operating the Supreme Court steadily increased—from $54,530 in 1880 (equivalent to $1,792,564 in 2023), to $60,840 in 1890 (equivalent to $2,208,249 in 2023), and $66,087 in 1900 (equivalent to $2,542,306 in 2023). These rising costs regularly drew criticism from the opposition. Justice Minister and future Supreme Court Justice David Mills remarked that "maintaining [the Court] costs altogether too much for what it does."

=== Expansion of duties of justices ===
During the late 1890s the Supreme Court justices increasingly took on additional roles at the request of government, reflecting the court's evolving stature and growing involvement in public affairs beyond the bench. These political and quasi-judicial roles outside of their duties on the bench reflected a gradual increase in respect for the court.

In 1896, Justice George King was appointed to the Anglo-American arbitration committee tasked with settling claims arising from the Bering Sea Arbitration. In 1902, Chief Justice Strong was appointed president of an arbitration commission to resolve a claim between San Salvador and the United States. Strong ultimately sided with the Americans, but the proceedings became controversial after the Salvadorian representative filed a complaint over Strong's offensive treatment and Strong's criticisms during the hearings.

In 1901, the Laurier government refused to accept the general officer commanding in Halifax as the Administrator of the Government of Canada in the absence of the Governor General. Instead, on the suggestion of the Cabinet, Strong as the Chief Justice of Canada was appointed to the role for the first time. Strong complained to the government that he did not receive a per diem for the additional duties.

== Legal philosophy of the court ==
Justices Henry and Fournier were creative in their decision making process, rather than mechanically applying rules to facts. Similarly, Justice Sedgewick considered the factual matters and socio-economic context of legal disputes, with limited discussion of previous case law.

From a constitutional perspective, Justices Gwynne and Taschereau were believers in the "Macdonaldian constitution", which emphasized a strong federal government with broad jurisdiction and subordinate provincial governments. Justice Sedgewick, in his limited written decisions in Constitutional cases also took a pro-federal government perspective.

== Appraisal ==
Historians Snell and Vaughan described the elevation of Strong to chief justice as a poor choice. Although Strong was highly intelligent and had an interest in French civil law and language, his abrasive personality and poor work ethic undermined his effectiveness as a leader. Strong was not an effective leader of the court, was frequently absent for portions or entire sittings, and often fell behind on his own drafting assignments. Snell and Vaughan argue that the conduct of the justices, and in particular, Chief Justice Strong, was a major cause of the court's poor reputation during this period. The court's inconsistency was exemplified by its conflicting decisions issued on the same day in the Local Prohibition Case companion cases, which historian Ian Bushnell described as creating "a comic self-image." Bushnell notes that while Strong was a dominant presence on the court, he lacked leadership, and as a result, "the Court spiraled downward in the estimation of both the bar and the public."

Contemporary perceptions of the court were similarly negative. In 1896, the Canada Law Journal observed that the Supreme Court did not command the confidence of the legal profession in either English Canada or Quebec. In private correspondence, the journal's editor went further, stating that the court was "held in contempt by the profession." Strong's leadership further damaged the court's reputation in 1898—particularly due to the widespread but inaccurate belief that he had called for the dismissal of a Quebec lower court judge for incompetence, and for dismissing an appeal from Ontario after giving counsel less than 24 hours' notice to appear in Ottawa. Historian Ian Bushnell notes that public criticism of the court reached its peak around 1902 in legal journals, parliament and in the public, although the criticism was mostly out of want for a better final court of appeal, rather than of any particular decision.

Additional criticisms targeted the politically motivated nature of many judicial appointments. While some legal journals occasionally defended the court from criticism in the press, historian Bushnell notes that these defences were motivated more by a desire to uphold the credibility of the legal system as a whole than by support for the Supreme Court itself. By 1902, only two of the six justices on the court had prior judicial experience, and the Canadian Law Times observed that the court's composition was held in the lowest regard in its history.

== See also ==
- Supreme Court of Canada cases
- List of Supreme Court of Canada cases (Richards Court through Fauteux Court)
- List of Canadian appeals to the Judicial Committee of the Privy Council, 1890–1899
- List of Canadian appeals to the Judicial Committee of the Privy Council, 1900–1909
