= Faculté de droit de l'Université Laval =

Law school in Quebec City, Canada

Laval University Faculty of Law
- Faculté de droit de l'université Laval
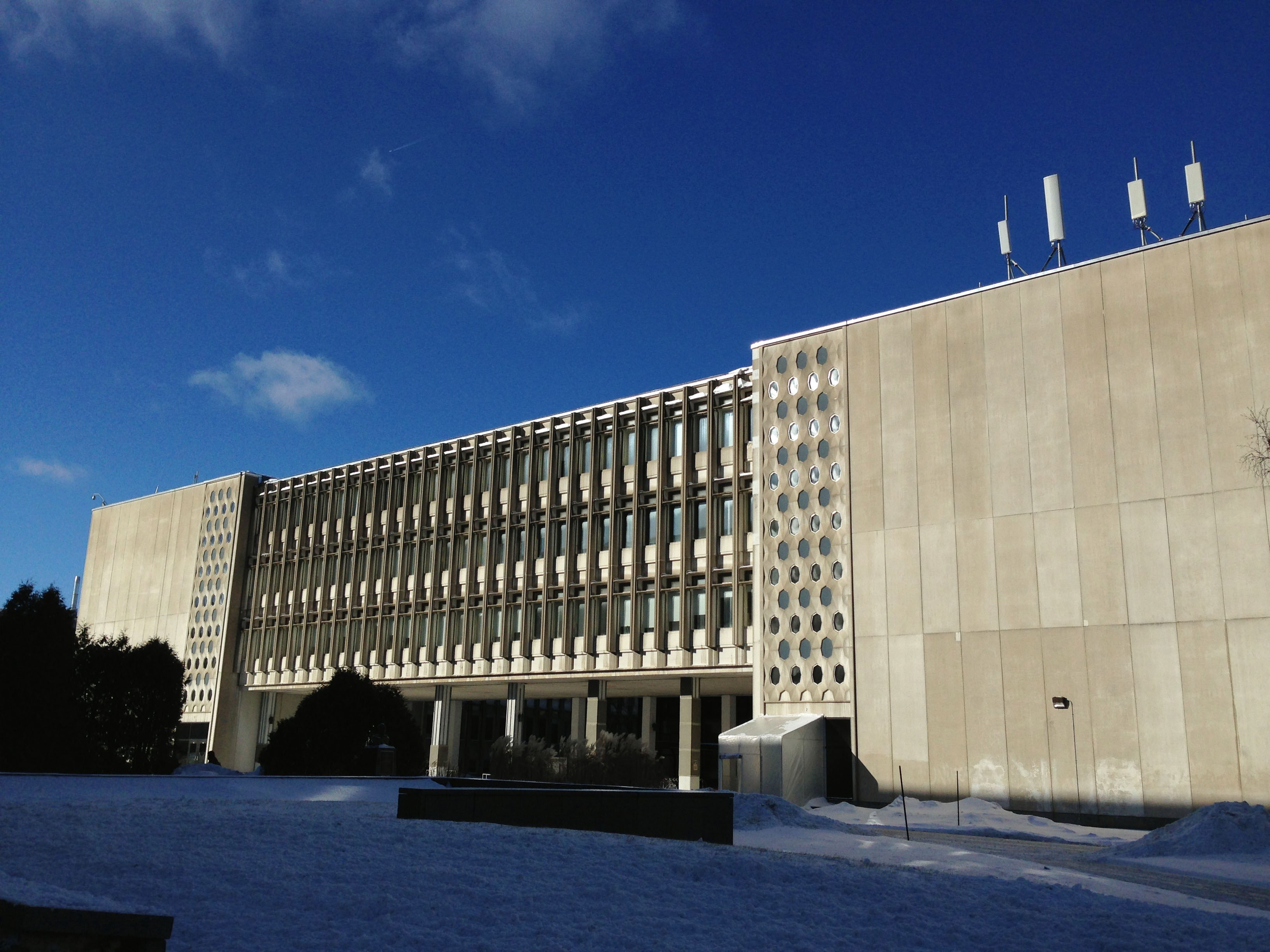
- Faculté de droit
- Motto: Deo favente haud pluribus impar • Avec la grâce de Dieu, à nul autre comparable
- Motto in English: With God's help, to no one equal
- Type: Public
- Established: 1852
- Parent institution: Université Laval
- Dean: Anne-Marie Laflamme
- Academic staff: > 45
- Students: > 1,000
- Location: Pavillon Charles-De Koninck, 1030, avenue des Sciences-Humaines, Quebec City, Quebec, G1V 0A6, Canada; 46°46′53″N 71°16′30″W
- Campus: Urban
- Language: French
- Website: www.fd.ulaval.ca

University rankings

World rankings

Canadian rankings

The Faculté de droit de l'Université Laval is the law school of Université Laval. Founded in 1852, it is one of the oldest institutions of its kind in North America. It hosts more than 1,000 students in its curriculum of first, second, and third years, with more than 45 lecturers teaching and supervising research projects in most areas of law. The research activity is particularly intense in the field of human rights and public freedoms in light of legal issues, economic law, environmental law, public law, and private international trade.

Teaching and research are based on a law library with more than 200,000 documents, which receives subscriptions of several hundred legal periodicals from Quebec, Canada, and internationally.

== Specializations ==
The Laval Faculty of Law allows for specializations in:

- Public law
- Commercial law
- International law
- Corporate law (French: droit de l'entreprise)
- Tax law
- Judicial law
- Criminal law
- Labour law

== Programs of study ==
- Certificate of Law (French: Certificat en droit)
- Bachelor of Laws (French: Baccalauréat en droit) (LL. B.)
- Doctor of Law (French: Doctorat en droit)
- Master of Laws (LL. M.) (French: Maîtrise en droit)

- LL. M. in Business Law
- LL. M. in Environmental Law, Sustainable Development and Food Security
- LL. M. in Fundamental Rights
- LL. M. in International and Transnational Law

- Master of Notarial Law (LL. M.) (French: Maîtrise en droit notarial)

== Alumni ==
The Laval Law School has educated many prominent Canadians. Many alumni have distinguished themselves in English and French Canada, most notably, in the fields of the civil service, politics, the judiciary, and business.

Numerous public figures, including Prime Ministers of Canada, Premiers of Quebec, Supreme Court Justices, federal Cabinet Ministers, Senators, and Lieutenant-Governors attended the Laval Faculty of Law.

=== Supreme Court of Canada justices ===
- Henri Elzéar Taschereau — Justice of the Supreme Court of Canada
- Sir Charles Fitzpatrick — Justice of the Supreme Court of Canada
- Arthur Cyrille Albert Malouin — Justice of the Supreme Court of Canada
- Lawrence Arthur Dumoulin Cannon — Justice of the Supreme Court of Canada
- Robert Taschereau — Justice of the Supreme Court of Canada
- Louis-Philippe Pigeon — Justice of the Supreme Court of Canada
- Yves Pratte — Justice of the Supreme Court of Canada
- Julien Chouinard — Justice of the Supreme Court of Canada
- Louis LeBel — Justice of the Supreme Court of Canada
- Claire L'Heureux-Dubé — Justice of the Supreme Court of Canada
- Suzanne Côté — Justice of the Supreme Court of Canada

=== Politicians ===
- Louis St. Laurent — Prime Minister of Canada
- Brian Mulroney — Prime Minister of Canada
- Jean Chrétien — Prime Minister of Canada
- Pierre Duchesne — Lieutenant-Governor of Quebec
- Edmund James Flynn — Premier of Quebec 1896-1897
- Louis-Alexandre Taschereau — Premier of Quebec 1920-1936
- Jean Lesage — Premier of Quebec 1960-1966
- René Lévesque — (did not graduate) Premier of Quebec 1976-1985
- Lucien Bouchard — Premier of Quebec 1996–2001, Leader of the Bloc Québécois
- Michael Meighen — Senator
- Michael Fortier — Senator
- Raymond C. Setlakwe — Senator

=== Royalty ===
- Jean, Grand Duke of Luxembourg, Monarch of Luxembourg from 1964 to 2000

=== Business ===
- Conrad Black — former media magnate
- Peter White
- William John Jacques Demers

=== Entertainment ===
- Ben Mulroney — television presenter

== See also ==
- List of law schools in Canada
