= John Henderson Lamont =

Canadian politician (1865–1936)

The Honourable John Henderson Lamont
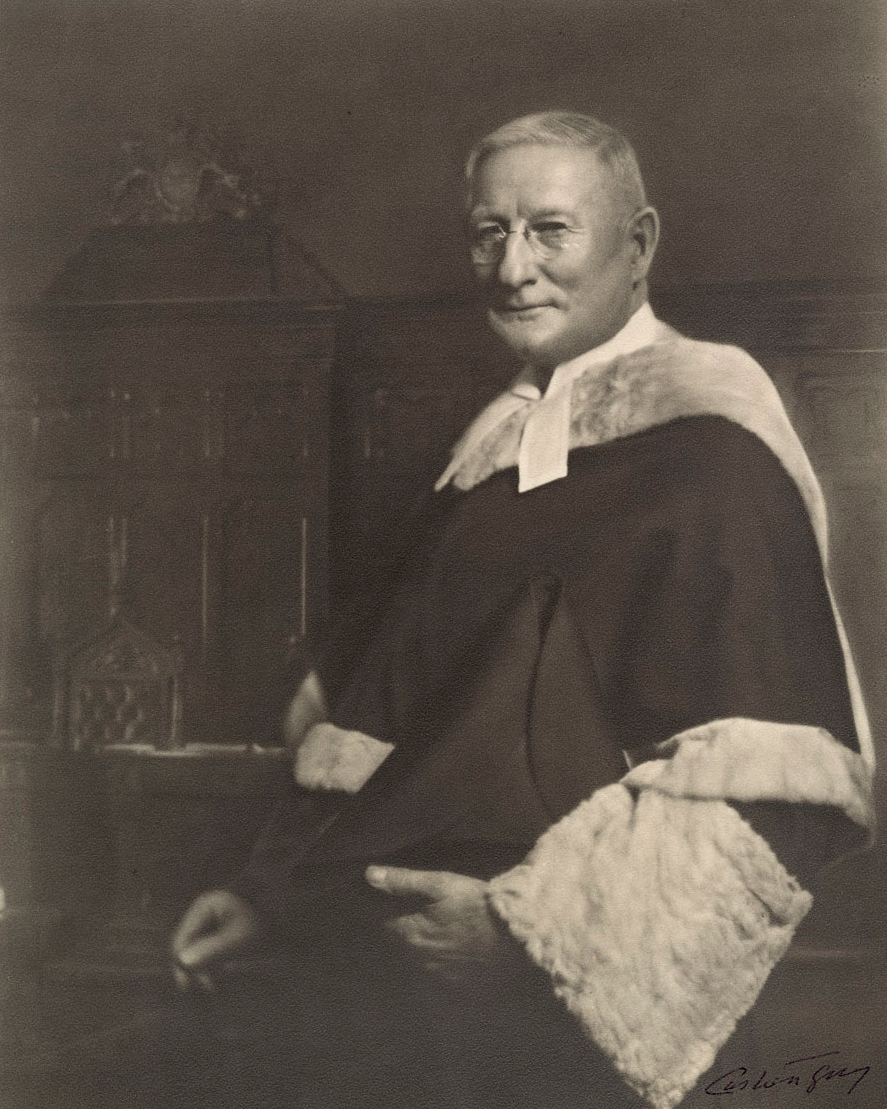

Puisne Justice of the Supreme Court of Canada
- In office April 2, 1927 – March 10, 1936
- Nominated by: William Lyon Mackenzie King
- Preceded by: John Idington
- Succeeded by: Albert Hudson

Member of the Legislative Assembly of Saskatchewan for Prince Albert
- In office December 13, 1905 – September 23, 1907
- Preceded by: None (new position)
- Succeeded by: William Ferdinand Alphonse Turgeon

Member of the Canadian Parliament for Saskatchewan (Provisional District)
- In office November 3, 1904 – September 5, 1905
- Preceded by: Thomas Osborne Davis
- Succeeded by: George Ewan McCraney

Personal details
- Born: November 12, 1865 Horning's Mills, Canada West
- Died: March 10, 1936 (aged 70) Ottawa, Ontario
- Party: Liberal (federal); Liberal (Saskatchewan)
- Education: University of Toronto (BA) (LLB)

John Henderson Lamont (November 12, 1865 – March 10, 1936) was a Canadian lawyer, politician, and judge from Saskatchewan. His short political career lasting three years saw Lamont serve as a member of the House of Commons, the Legislative Assembly of Saskatchewan, and as the first Attorney General of Saskatchewan in the Walter Scott government. As a judge, he was appointed to the Supreme Court of Saskatchewan, Court of Appeal for Saskatchewan, and in 1927 as a puisne justice of the Supreme Court of Canada.

Born in Horning's Mills, Canada West, Lamont attended law school at the University of Toronto, after a short period of practicing in Toronto, he moved to Prince Albert, Saskatchewan to continue his career. Lamont entered federal politics in 1904 as a Liberal, winning election in the Saskatchewan (Provisional District) with a strong majority. He resigned less than a year later to run for the newly established legislative assembly. Lamont was elected, and appointed Saskatchewan's first Attorney General, where he oversaw the establishment of the province’s legal and legislative framework.

He left politics after two years and was appointed to the Superior Court in Saskatchewan. In 1927, he was appointed to the Supreme Court of Canada on the advice of Prime Minister William Lyon Mackenzie King, a role he remained in until his death in 1936. Lamont was the first justice of the Supreme Court from Saskatchewan.

== Early life ==
Lamont was born on November 12, 1865, in Horning's Mills, Canada West (now Ontario), the son of Duncan Carmichael Lamont and Margaret Robson Henderson, who were farmers. His father had emigrated from the Isle of Mull, Scotland. Lamont received his early education at high schools in Brampton and Orangeville, Ontario. He later attended the University of Toronto, where he earned a Bachelor of Arts degree in 1892 and a Bachelor of Laws degree in 1893. He was called to the Ontario bar in 1895.

After being called to the bar, Lamont practised law in Toronto for four years before leaving in 1899 to the Northwest Territories. He settled in Prince Albert, (now Saskatchewan), where he co-founded a law firm and quickly established himself as a prominent member of the local bar. In 1902, he became a Crown Prosecutor, and three years later, in 1905, he was made King's Counsel.

== Political career ==
In 1904, Lamont entered politics as the Liberal candidate for the Saskatchewan (Provisional District) in the federal election. He was elected, securing 62 percent of the vote and defeating Conservative candidate Thomas McKay, the first mayor of Prince Albert in the 1880s. Following Saskatchewan's entry into Confederation as a province on September 1, 1905, Lamont resigned his seat in the House of Commons on September 5, 1905, to contest the first provincial general election.

Lamont ran as a provincial Liberal candidate in Prince Albert City under the leadership of Walter Scott. He was elected with 47 percent of the vote, defeating William Cowan of Frederick Haultain's Provincial Rights Party and Independent candidate William Thomas Gillmor.

A close friend of Scott from their time together in the House of Commons, Lamont was appointed Saskatchewan's first Attorney General. In this capacity, he oversaw the creation of the province's initial legislative framework, the organization of its court system, and the development of municipal law. He also introduced and implemented the Torrens land title system in Saskatchewan, earning recognition for the "initial interpretation and application" of the Torrens system in Canada.

== Early judicial career ==
In September 1907, Lamont resigned as a member of the Legislative Assembly of Saskatchewan and attorney general, to be appointed as a justice of the Supreme Court of Saskatchewan. In Quong Wing v R (1913), Lamont wrote the 2–1 majority opinion upholding the conviction of Quong Wing, a naturalized Canadian citizen originally from China, who tried to hire two white women to work in his restaurant in Moose Jaw. This contravened the provincial statute An Act to prevent the Employment of Female Labour in Certain Capacities, which prohibited white women and girls from working in businesses owned by "Chinamen". (Note: Rex v Quong Sing, 1913 CanLII 117, (1913) 12 DLR 656, Supreme Court of Saskatchewan) The decision was subsequently upheld in a 4–1 majority at the Supreme Court of Canada on division of powers grounds and earlier precedent. (Note: Quong Wing v The King, 1914 CanLII 608, (1914) 49 SCR 440, Supreme Court (Canada)) Historians Snell and Vaughan note that by rationalizing popular racial discrimination, the courts helped entrench legalized discrimination in Canada.

In March 1918, the Saskatchewan courts were reorganized, with the appeal functions were severed from the Supreme Court. Lamont was transferred to the newly established Court of Appeal for Saskatchewan, along with Chief Justice Haultain, and justices Henry William Newlands and Edward Lindsay Elwood.

== Puisne Justice of the Supreme Court of Canada ==
On April 2, 1927, Prime Minister William Lyon Mackenzie King appointed Lamont to the Supreme Court of Canada to replace the vacancy created from the forced resignation of Justice John Idington. Lamont's appointment followed significant lobbying by politicians for representation from the Prairie region, which until then had been represented only briefly by Albert Clements Killam, who served for 18 months from 1903 to 1905. Lamont's appointment established the tradition of reserving a seat on the Supreme Court for the Prairies.

In Montreal Tramways Co. v Léveillé (1933), the Court considered whether an infant had standing to sue for injuries sustained before they were born. Lamont's majority judgement upheld the Quebec Court of Appeal's ruling permitting the lawsuit. Lamont relied on natural justice, but noted that there were limitations in medical science for establishing causation for prenatal injuries that may be overcome in the future. (Note: Montreal Tramways Co. v Léveillé, 1933 CanLII 41, [1933] SCR 456, Supreme Court (Canada))

In his later years on the Court, Lamont had poor health, in 1935, he was granted a leave of absence. On March 10, 1936, Lamont died at the age of 70.

== Legacy ==
Lamont, Alberta is named in his honour.
