= Quong Wing v R =

- Supreme Court of Canada

Hearing: Judgment: February 23, 1914
- Full case name: Quong Wing v The King
- Citations: 1914 CanLII 57 (SCC), (1914) 49 SCR 440, (1914) 18 DLR 121
- Prior history: Rex v Quong Sing, 1913 CanLII 117 (SK CA)

Court membership
- Chief Justice: Charles Fitzpatrick; Puisne Justices: Louis Henry Davies, John Idington, Lyman Duff, Francis Alexander Anglin, Louis-Philippe Brodeur

Reasons given
- Majority: Fitzpatrick C.J.C., Davies J., Anglin J. and Duff J.
- Dissent: Idington J.
- Brodeur J. took no part in the consideration or decision of the case.

Quong Wing v R, (1914), 49 SCR 440, was a decision of the Supreme Court of Canada which ruled that provincial laws that discriminated against naturalized Chinese citizens was valid.

== Background ==
Quong Wing, a naturalized Canadian citizen originally from China, operated a restaurant in Moose Jaw, Saskatchewan. In 1912, he attempted to hire two white women, Mabel Hopham and Nellie Lane, as waitresses. This contravened the provincial statute An Act to prevent the Employment of Female Labour in Certain Capacities, which prohibited white women and girls from working in businesses owned by "Chinamen". The short Act had only one main provision which stated:

1 No person shall employ in any capacity any white woman or girl or permit any white woman or girl to reside or lodge in or to work in or, save as a bona fide customer in a public apartment thereof only, to frequent any restaurant, laundry or other place of business or amusement owned, kept or managed by any Japanese, Chinaman or other Oriental person. (Note: An Act to prevent the Employment of Female Labour in Certain Capacities, S.S. 1912, c. 17, s. 1)

The Act, passed by the 2nd Saskatchewan Legislature, came into force on May 1, 1912. The penalty for violating the Act was a fine not exceeding $100, and if in default of the fine, imprisonment for no more than two months. (Note: An Act to prevent the Employment of Female Labour in Certain Capacities, S.S. 1912, c. 17, s. 2)

=== Case history ===
Wing was convicted by the Moose Jaw police magistrate.

=== Decision of the Supreme Court of Saskatchewan ===
Wing appealed the decision to the Supreme Court of Saskatchewan before a panel of Chief Justice Frederick W. A. G. Haultain, and Justices Henry William Newlands, John Henderson Lamont, and James Thomas Brown. (Note: Rex v Quong Sing, 1913 CanLII 117, (1913) 12 DLR 656, Supreme Court of Saskatchewan) (Note: Prior to 1918, there was no appeal court in Saskatchewan, rather, appeals were conducted by the full court of the Supreme Court of Saskatchewan, consisting of all the judges of the Supreme Court, other than the judge who made the decision under appeal.) Wing was represented by Leader of the Opposition Wellington Willoughby.

The Supreme Court of Saskatchewan upheld the conviction by a 3–1 majority. Chief Justice Frederick W. A. G. Haultain dissented. The panel also included Justice John Henderson Lamont, later appointed to the Supreme Court of Canada in 1927.

== Decision of the Supreme Court of Canada ==
Wing appealed, arguing that the law was outside the power of the province as laws related to morality were considered criminal matters which is the exclusive authority of the federal government. As well, he argued that the law did not intend to include naturalized citizens.

The Supreme Court held in a four to one decision that the law was valid. The Court interpreted the word "Chinaman" as including all those born in China regardless of subsequent nationality. (Note: Quong Wing v The King, 1914 CanLII 57, (1914) 49 SCR 440, Supreme Court (Canada))

Justice John Idington, alone in dissent, was the only one concerned with the justification of the law and held the law to be invalid on the basis that citizenship was a matter of federal jurisdiction and so ultra vires of provincial powers.

The Judicial Committee of the Privy Council refused to hear any further appeal.

== Aftermath ==
In 2024, the Quong Wing Legal Challenge was designated by the Canadian government as a National Historic Event.

== See also ==
- Christie v. York [1940] S.C.R. 139
- Noble v. Alley [1951] S.C.R. 64
