= Université de Montréal Faculty of Law =

Coordinates: 45.49865°N 73.6170°W

Université de Montréal - Faculty of Law
- Coat of Arms
- Motto: Pro Jure Patrio Stamus
- Motto in English: We will defend our rights
- Type: Public
- Established: 1892
- Dean: France Houle
- Academic staff: 56
- Students: 1500
- Location: Montreal, Quebec, Canada
- Language: French and English
- Colours: Blue, White, Gold
- Website: droit.umontreal.ca

The Faculty of Law at Université de Montréal in Canada was officially founded in 1892. In 2018, the Faculty was ranked by Times Higher Education as the best francophone law school in the world. In addition to its civil law degree (LL.B.), the Law School offers a one-year J.D. in common law for Quebec civil law graduates that enables them to take the bar exam in other Canadian provinces and in New York, Massachusetts and California.

University rankings

World rankings
- QS World: 101-150

Canadian rankings

UdeM Faculty of Law is bilingual. The languages of instruction are French for LL.B. and most LL.M. programs, with the J.D. and LL.D. program being bilingual French-English and some programs (such as the LL.M. in Business Law in a Global Context) being in English only.

== History ==
The Faculty was originally a branch of Québec City's Université Laval in Montréal. It became part of the Université de Montréal upon its foundation in 1920. Between 1895 and 1942, the Faculty was located on St. Denis St. in Montréal. In 1945, it moved to Mount-Royal and was relocated in 1968 to its current location, which became the Pavillon Maximilien-Caron in 1978 in honour of a jurist. One of the first full-time law professors in Quebec, Maximillien Caron promoted a reform in the teaching of law that integrated all aspects of life and instituted new pedagogical methods that included sociology, economics and politics. Since the graduation of its first class in 1879, the Faculty has trained the largest number of jurists in Canada. Indeed, approximately 15,000 students have obtained an undergraduate law degree from the Faculty. The Faculty of Law is recognized among leading Canadian law schools and has produced numerous judges, politicians, and academics.

== Law Review ==
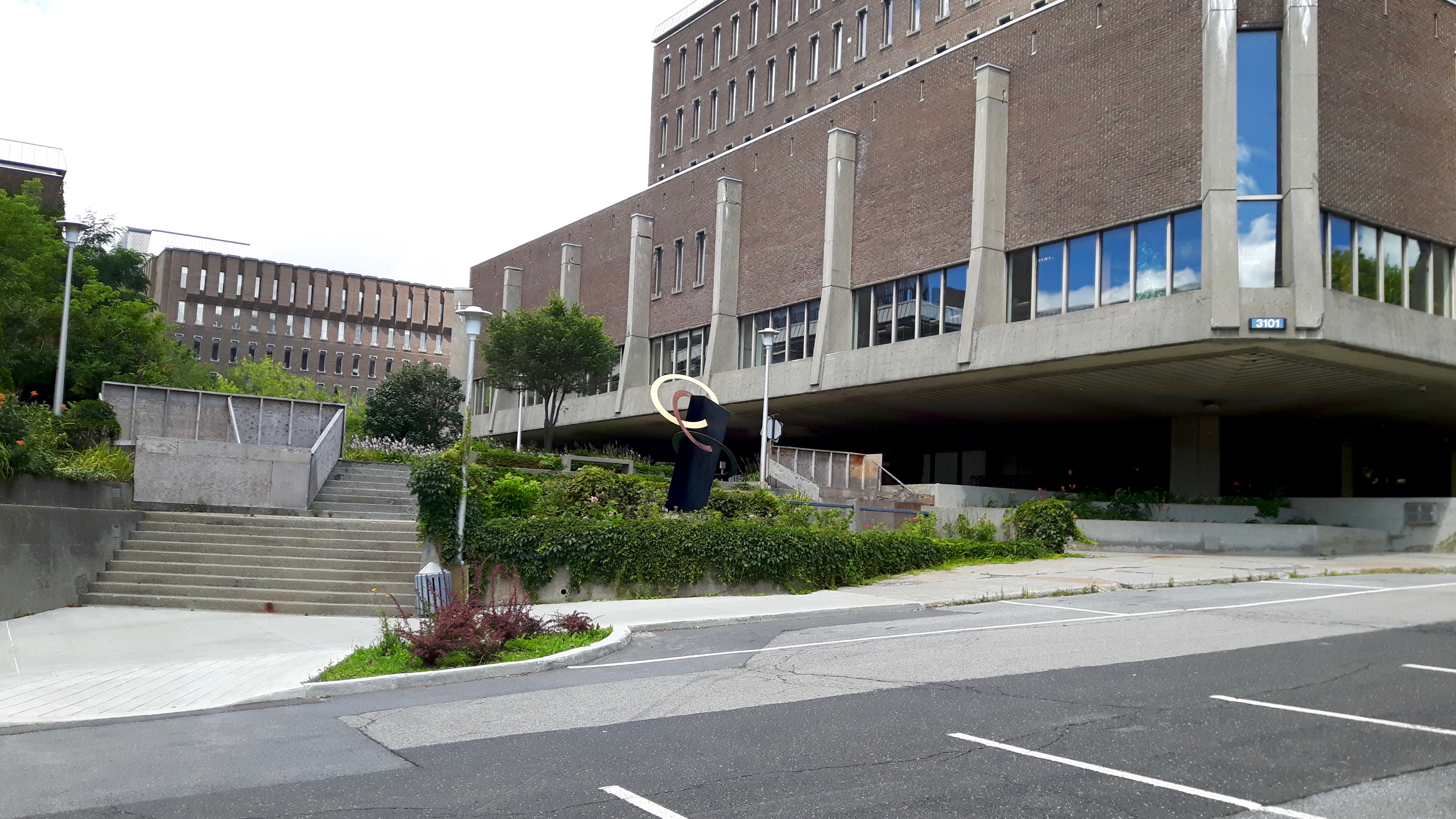
Pavillon Maximilien-Caron, the main building of the law school

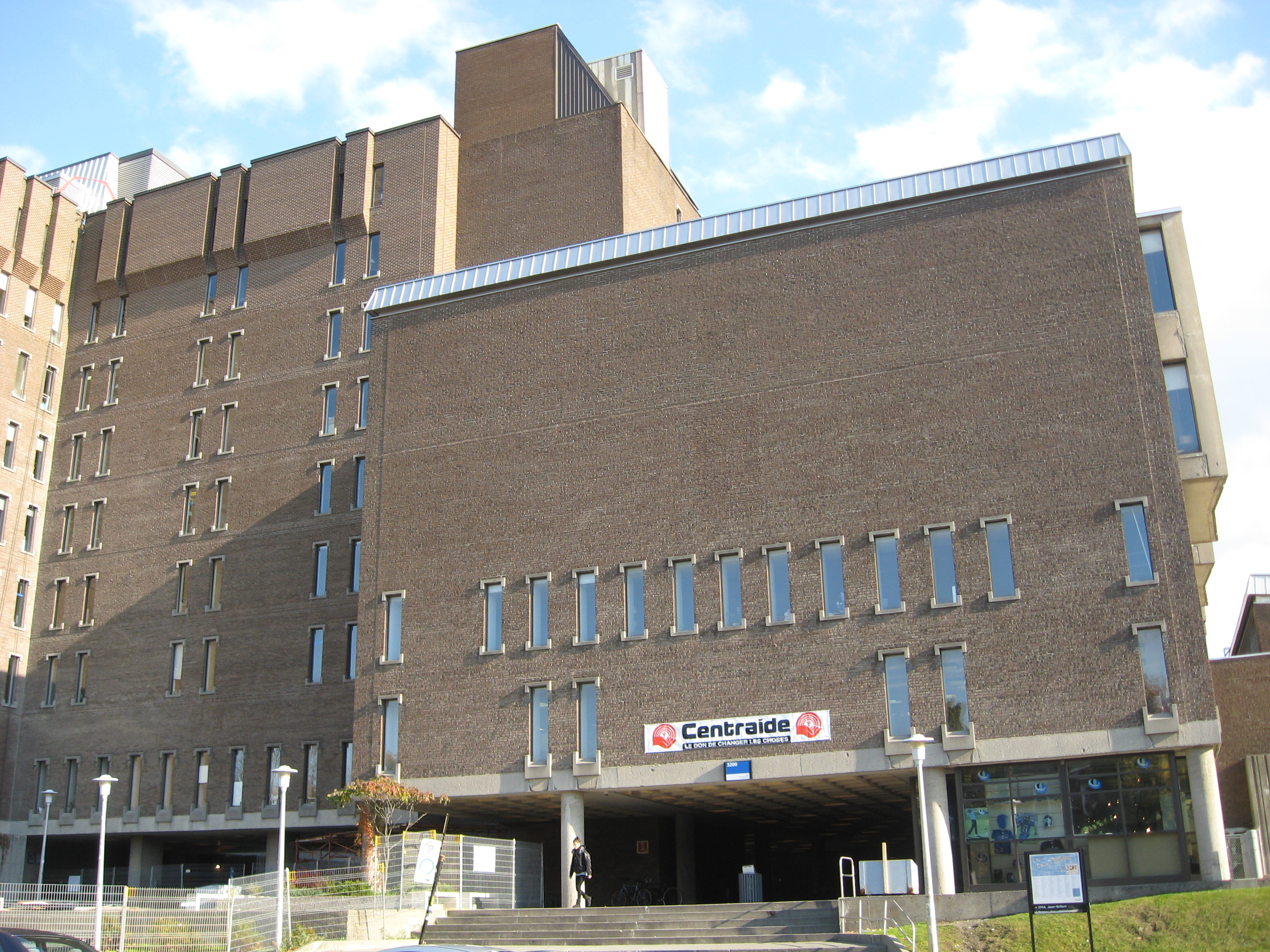
Pavillon 3200 Jean-Brillant, the building in which most of the law school's undergraduate classes take place

For nearly 60 years, the Faculty has published the Revue Juridique Thémis de l'Université de Montréal which was ranked by the Washington and Lee University School of Law as Canada's first primarily French-speaking journal, along with the University of Toronto Law Journal for English-speaking Canada and the Harvard Law Review for the United States. The Revue is published three times a year and touches upon public law, private law and criminal law. It includes contributions from the research centres of the Faculty and letters from international jurists about their legal system.

== Public Law Research Centre ==
Established in 1962, the Public Law Research Centre (Centre de recherche en droit public (CRDP)) is the first and most important legal research centre in Canada. The CRDP is renowned for its interdisciplinary approach and work on contemporary forms of law as well as for maximizing the involvement of students in its extensive research activities. Research concentrates on three main axes: law and new social relations; law and information and communications technologies; and, law, biotechnology and community. Since 1995, the Centre publishes a bilingual electronic review, Lex Electronica, which is an international journal specializing in communications and information technologies law, health and biotechnology law, as well as theories of law and social changes. The Centre relies on the active participation of 15 full-time researchers and 50 students from a dozen countries currently working on over 20 research projects. Among the CRDP's most important recent research projects, one deals with the various dimensions of the status of Aboriginal peoples in Canada, and another one examines questions pertaining to privacy and information security.

== Student life ==
Students of the Faculty belong to two student associations, the Association of Law Students (AED, undergraduate level) and the Association of Graduate Law Students (ACSED, graduate level). These two associations are part of the Federation of Student Associations of the Campus of the Université de Montréal (FAÉCUM). Members of their executive boards sit at Faculty Council as well as on other Faculty committees. In addition to organizing cultural and professional development activities, they coordinate numerous other committees, as the well known Comité du droit des affaires et de gestion (CDAG) and the Comité Droit et Politique, therefore contributing to a dynamic student life. The AED publishes a student newspaper, Le Pigeon Dissident, and both associations have launched websites presenting their activities and addressing other subjects of interest.

== Notable alumni ==
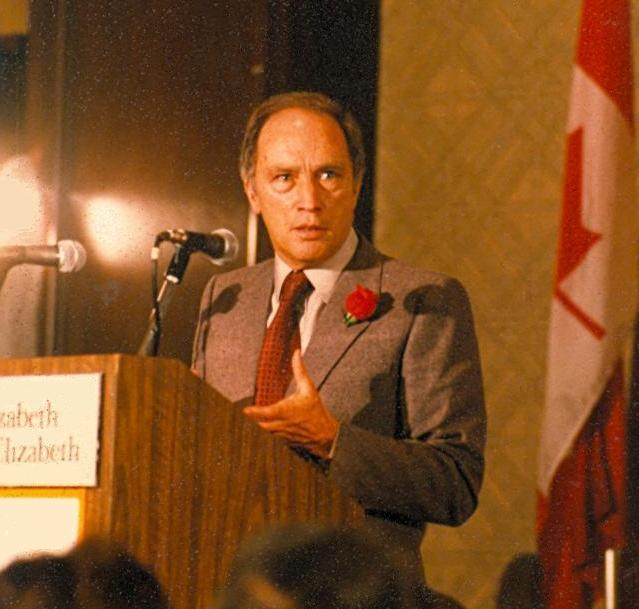
- Pierre Elliott Trudeau, Prime Minister of Canada
  Louise Arbour, Supreme Court of Canada Justice (1999–2004), UN High Commissioner for Human Rights (2004–2008)
- Michel Bastarache, Puisne Justice of the Supreme Court of Canada
- Raymond Bachand, Cabinet Minister of the Québec Liberal Party
- Jean Beetz, Puisne Justice of the Supreme Court of Canada (1974-1988)
- Robert Bourassa, 22nd Premier of Quebec (1970-1976, 1985–1994)
- Marie Deschamps, Supreme Court of Canada Justice (2002–2012)
- Jules Deschênes, Judge of the United Nations International Criminal Tribunal for former Yugoslavia (1993-1997)
- Jean Drapeau, Mayor of Montreal (1954-1957 and 1960-1986)
- Gérald Fauteux, 13th Chief Justice of Canada (1970-1973) and Puisne Justice of the Supreme Court (1949–1970)
- Daniel Johnson, Jr., 25th Premier of Quebec (1994)
- Pierre-Marc Johnson, 24th Premier of Quebec (1985)
- Philippe Kirsch, 1st President of the International Criminal Court (2003-2009)
- Antonio Lamer, 16th Chief Justice of Canada (1990–2000) and Puisne Justice of the Supreme Court (1980–1990)
- Bernard Landry, Premier of Quebec (2001–2003)
- Pierre Karl Péladeau, CEO of Quebecor
- Robert Petit, International Co-Prosecutor for the Extraordinary Chambers in the Courts of Cambodia (2006-2009)
- William Schabas, Professor of International Law at Middlesex University, London
- Pierre Elliott Trudeau, 15th Prime Minister of Canada (1968–1979, 1980-1984)
- Georges P. Vanier, 19th Governor-General of Canada (1959-1967)
- Mélanie Joly, Minister of Canadian Heritage (2015–present)

== Notable faculty ==
- Claude Laferrière — Lecturer in national security law and author of Traité de droit de la sécurité nationale : États-Unis d’Amérique / Canada (Wilson & Lafleur, 2018, 1158 pp, ISBN 978-2896895892) and Five Essays on U.S. National Security Law (Wilson & Lafleur, 2009).
