= John Idington =

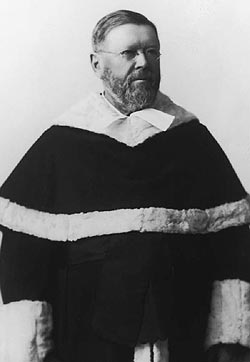
- John Idington in 1914

Puisne Justice of the Supreme Court of Canada
- In office February 10, 1905 – March 31, 1927
- Nominated by: Wilfrid Laurier
- Preceded by: Albert Killam
- Succeeded by: John Lamont

Personal details
- Born: October 14, 1840 Puslinch, Upper Canada
- Died: February 7, 1928 (aged 87) Ottawa, Ontario
- Resting place: Avondale Cemetery, Stratford
- Spouse: Margaret Colcleugh
- Children: 11
- Education: University of Toronto
- Profession: Lawyer

John Idington (October 14, 1840 – February 7, 1928) was a Canadian justice of the Supreme Court of Canada.

== Early life ==
Idington was born on October 14, 1840, in Puslinch, Upper Canada (now Ontario), the eldest child of Peter Idington, a farmer, and his wife Catherine Stewart. His parents were among the Scottish pioneers who settled in Puslinch, south of Guelph. In 1853, the family relocated to a farm in Waterloo County near Fisher's Mills. Idington studied law at the University of Toronto, earning an LLB in 1864, the same year he was called to the Ontario Bar.

== Legal career ==
Idington practised law in Stratford in partnership with politician and fellow Liberal Robert MacFarlane. After MacFarlane's death in 1872, he continued to manage the growing practice. In 1879, Idington was appointed Crown attorney and clerk of the peace for Perth County. In this capacity, he conducted the 1894 prosecution of Almede Chattelle for the murder of thirteen-year-old Jessie Keith in Listowel, Ontario.

In January 1886, Idington was appointed solicitor for the City of Stratford, a position he held until his elevation to the bench in 1904. The following year he was elected the first president of the Perth County Law Society. From 1891 to 1904, he served as a bencher of the Law Society of Upper Canada, and in 1894–95 he was president of the Western Bar Association. As a bencher, Idington supported Clara Brett Martin's admission to the law society. On September 13, 1892, Idington made the motion that would have admitted Martin as the first female member of the society, but it was defeated by a vote of 9–4. Throughout his legal career, Idington was able to get experience in criminal and municipal law.

A believer in the need for proportional representation, in 1898 he was chairman of the Proportional Representation Committee of Ontario.

In 1904, Prime Minister Wilfrid Laurier appointed Idington to the High Court of Justice of Ontario.

== Justice of the Supreme Court of Canada ==
On February 10, 1905, Prime Minister Wilfrid Laurier appointed Idington to the Supreme Court of Canada, to replace Justice Albert Clements Killam who resigned to become Chief Commissioner of the Board of Railway Commissioners. Idington had only been on the Ontario bench for a year before his appointment to the Supreme Court. His appointment, which replaced the Court's only western representative with another justice from Ontario, surprised the legal community and western Canada, and prompted speculation that it was difficult to persuade judges to accept an appointment to the Supreme Court.

As a justice, Idington was critical of the appeal to the Judicial Committee of the Privy Council, noting that "A later generation may laugh [when struggling with its results] ... but, meantime, we must accept it with becoming respect as a proper interpretation of the B.N.A. Act." and "[the Supreme Court] might better be described as a legal sifting machine for sorting out claims on their road to the Judicial Committee of the Privy Council which is the only final court of appeal in our system."

His notable decisions include his dissent in Quong Wing v The King, (Note: Quong Wing v The King, 1914 CanLII 608, (1914) 49 SCR 440, Supreme Court (Canada)) in which he disagreed with the effects of racist legislation, on the basis that the use of the term "Chinaman" could not have been meant to refer to naturalized Canadians of Chinese origin.

In 1924, following the death of Sir Louis Henry Davies, Idington was passed over for the position of Chief Justice of Canada, even though he was the senior Puisne Justice on the Court.

=== Health issues and retirement ===
In his later years, Idington's mental capacity declined, leading Prime Minister William Lyon Mackenzie King to describe him as "senile." He missed the entire 1925 spring term and all but one day of the next two terms due to health issues, and continued to be absent for significant portions of the Court's sittings until his retirement. In February 1926, Minister of Justice Ernest Lapointe formally asked him to step down. The King government had been advocating for mandatory judicial retirement since at least 1924. In 1927, Parliament amended the Supreme Court Act to expand the Court to seven judges and to introduce a mandatory retirement age of 75. (Note: An Act to amend the Supreme Court Act, S.C. 1927, c. 38 (An Act to amend the Supreme Court Act at Archive.org)) As a result, Idington was removed from office on March 31, 1927, at the age of 86, when the amendments came into force.

== Later life ==
On October 5, 1927, his wife Margaret Colcleugh died. Idington died shortly after his retirement on February 7, 1928, at the age of 87 in Ottawa. He is buried in Avondale Cemetery in Stratford.

== Legacy ==
Idington was created a provincial QC in 1876 and a dominion QC in 1885.

Supreme Court historians James Snell and Frederick Vaughan describe Idington's refusal to resign despite his health issues and incapacity to sit as a justice as "pathetic". However, Snell and Vaughan note that Idington's refusal to resign was important for the King government to secure bipartisan support for introducing a mandatory retirement age for the Supreme Court. Ian Bushnell describes Idington as an "individualist and renegade", whose jurisprudence declined over the years eventually becoming "erratic and petty." he took a progressive civil rights approach in Quong Wing (1914) and Gray (1918). When considering civil law cases from Quebec, Idington is described as running "roughshod" over the civil law, taking a strong common law approach and favored uniformity in Canadian law.

Biographer Gordon Bale notes that Idington had several partners in private practice, and that he may have been difficult to work with.
