= Robert Sedgewick (judge) =

Canadian judge (1848–1906)

The Honourable Robert Sedgewick
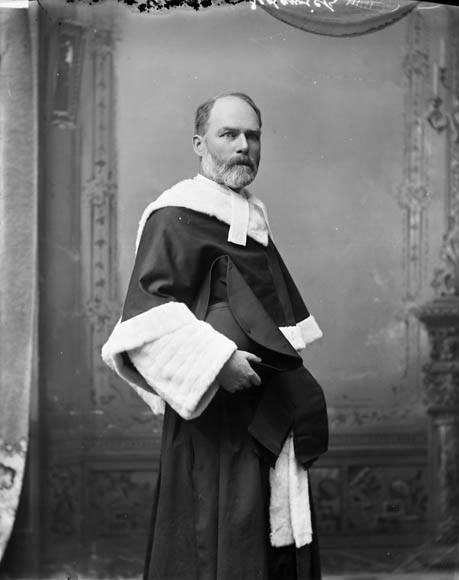
- The Honourable Mr. Justice Robert Sedgewick, May 1896

Puisne Justice of the Supreme Court of Canada
- In office February 18, 1893 – August 4, 1906
- Nominated by: John Sparrow David Thompson
- Preceded by: Samuel Henry Strong
- Succeeded by: Lyman Duff

Personal details
- Born: May 10, 1848 Aberdeen, Scotland
- Died: August 4, 1906 (aged 58) Chester, Nova Scotia
- Education: Dalhousie University

Robert Sedgewick (May 10, 1848 – August 4, 1906) was a Justice of the Supreme Court of Canada.

== Early life and education ==
Born in Aberdeen, Scotland, Sedgewick's family immigrated to Nova Scotia while he was still an infant. He was educated at Dalhousie University in Halifax, graduating in 1867. He articled in Cornwall, Ontario, in the private practice of John Sandfield Macdonald, who was at that time both the Premier and the Attorney General of Ontario. Sedgewick was called to the bar in Ontario in 1872, and in Nova Scotia in 1873 following his return to the province.

== Career ==
Sedgewick established a private practice in Halifax, and subsequently played an essential role in the establishment of the law school at Dalhousie in 1883. He was created a Dominion Queen's Counsel in 1881.

Beginning in the 1870s, Sedgewick became active in the Conservative Party of Canada. The connections thus established would serve him well, as his friend and former Halifax colleague John Sparrow David Thompson, who had become the federal Minister of Justice, appointed Sedgewick as Deputy Minister of Justice in February 1888. In this capacity, he played an important role in the establishment of the first national Criminal Code, which was enacted in 1892. Thompson, who had by then become the Prime Minister of Canada, also appointed Sedgewick to the Supreme Court of Canada on 18 February 1893, a position he was to hold until his death in 1906. He was a member of the North British Society.

On November 12, 1898, Sedgewick administered the oath of office to the 8th Governor General of Canada, the Earl of Minto.
