= Albert Clements Killam =

Canadian politician and Supreme Court judge

The Honourable Albert Clements Killam
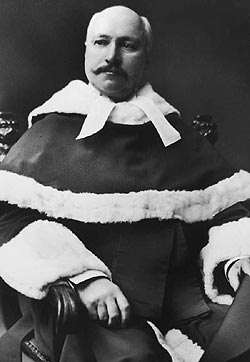

Puisne Justice of the Supreme Court of Canada
- In office August 8, 1903 – February 6, 1905
- Nominated by: Wilfrid Laurier
- Preceded by: John Douglas Armour
- Succeeded by: John Idington

Personal details
- Born: September 18, 1849 Yarmouth, Nova Scotia
- Died: March 1, 1908 (aged 58) Ottawa, Ontario

Albert Clements Killam, QC (September 18, 1849 – March 1, 1908) was a Canadian lawyer, politician, judge, railway commissioner, and Puisne judge of the Supreme Court of Canada. He was the first judge from Western Canada to be appointed to the Supreme Court.

Born in Yarmouth, Nova Scotia, the son of George Killam and Caroline Clements, he received a Bachelor of Arts degree in 1872 from the University of Toronto. He articled with the firm of Crooks, Kingsmill, and Cattanach of Toronto and was called to the Ontario bar in 1877. He practised for two years in Windsor. In 1879, he moved to Winnipeg and was called to the Manitoba bar.

In 1881 he became an examiner of the Law Society of Manitoba, and he served as a bencher of the society from 1882 to 1885. He was appointed QC by the Governor General, Lord Lansdowne on 9 May 1884.

In 1883, he was elected as a Liberal to the Legislative Assembly of Manitoba for the riding of Winnipeg South. He resigned in 1885, when he was appointed to the Court of Queen's Bench of Manitoba. In 1899, he was named Chief Justice of Manitoba and was appointed to the Supreme Court of Canada in 1903. He resigned in 1905 to become Chief Commissioner of the Board of Railway Commissioners. He died in 1908.

Killam, Alberta is named in his honour.
