= Munro v National Capital Commission =

Judgement of the Supreme Court of Canada

- Supreme Court of Canada

Hearing: May 2, 3, 4, 1966 Judgment: June 28, 1966
- Full case name: Harold Munro v National Capital Commission
- Citations: [1966] SCR 663
- Prior history: Judgment for the National Capital Commission in the Exchequer Court of Canada.
- Ruling: Appeal dismissed.

Holding
- It is within the powers of Parliament to authorize expropriation of land in the National Capital Region by the National Capital Commission for purposes defined in the National Capital Act.

Court membership

Reasons given
- Unanimous reasons by: Cartwright J

Laws applied
- Alberta (AG) v Canada (AG) [1943]; Quebec (AG) v Canada (AG) [1932]; Johannesson v West St Paul (Rural Municipality of) [1952]; Ontario (AG) v Canada Temperance Federation [1946]; Saskatchewan (AG) v Canada (AG) [1949]; Gold Seal Limited v Dominion Express Company [1921]

Munro v National Capital Commission, [1966] S.C.R. 663 is a leading Supreme Court of Canada decision on the federal peace, order, and good government power, where the Court held that the zoning, expropriation and renovation of land within the National Capital Region, in the vicinity of Ottawa, is a matter under the authority of the federal government.

Typically, matters of city improvement, zoning and bylaws are in the exclusive power of the provincial government under the property and civil rights power of the Constitution Act, 1867. However, the unique nature of the City of Ottawa in relation to the federal government was the basis of giving authority to the federal government. The interpretation of the "national concern" branch of the peace, order, and good government clause is a significantly broad one.

The National Capital Commission, a federal body, sought approval from the Governor General to expropriate land for the creation of a green belt around Ottawa. The proposal was challenged as being beyond the power of the NCC.

A unanimous Court held that the NCC plan falls within the "national concern test" of the peace, order, and good government clause. To reach this conclusion, the Court examined the pith and substance of the empowering legislation and found that the law was in relation to establishing the national capital region “in order that the nature and character of the seat of the Government of Canada may be in accordance with its national significance.” The Court then allocated the matter to a Constitutional head of power but found that it did not come within either section 92 (the provincial head of power) or section 91(1) (the federal head of power). Instead the Court held that it fell within Section 91 and the "national concern" branch of POGG as it deals with a “single matter of national interest” as in Ontario (AG) v Canada Temperance Federation.

== See also ==
- List of Supreme Court of Canada cases
