= Ontario (AG) v Canada Temperance Federation =

Canadian constitutional decision of the Judicial Committee of the Privy Council

- Court: Judicial Committee of the Privy Council
- Decided: 21 January 1946
- Citation: [1946] UKPC 2, [1946] AC 193

Case history
- Appealed from: Court of Appeal of Ontario

Court membership
- Judges sitting: Viscount Simon, Lord Thankerton, Lord Roche, Lord Greene, Lord Goddard

Case opinions
- Decision by: Viscount Simon

Ontario (AG) v Canada Temperance Federation was a famous Canadian constitutional decision of the Judicial Committee of the Privy Council and was among the first cases to examine the peace, order, and good government power of the Constitution Act, 1867. It was the first decision to bring back the "national concerns" branch of peace, order and good government since it was first suggested in the Local Prohibitions case.

== Background ==
In June 1939, the Ontario government posed the following reference question to the Court of Appeal of Ontario:

Are Parts I, II and III of the Canada Temperance Act constitutionally valid in whole or in part, and if in part, in what respect?

In presenting its case, Ontario argued:

1. While the Act had been declared valid in Russell v. The Queen, Viscount Haldane had commented in the later case of Toronto Electric Commissioners v. Snider that Russell could be supported now only on the ground that it was dealing with a matter that was "a menace to the national life of Canada" at that time (an emergency).
2. When the revised Act was enacted in 1927, having been originally enacted in 1878 and revised in 1886, there were no circumstances that enabled the Parliament of Canada to legislate anew.

== Court of Appeal of Ontario ==
In September 1939, the majority of the Court of Appeal (Riddell, Fisher, McTague and Gillanders JJA) gave the following answer:

This Court is of opinion (Mr Justice Henderson dissenting) that Parts I, II and III of the Canada Temperance Act... are within the legislative competence of the Parliament of Canada.

Ontario appealed the ruling to the Privy Council.

== Privy Council ==
The ruling was upheld by the Board. As to the arguments raised by Ontario,

1. While the Board was not bound by its previous decisions, it noted that nowhere in the British North America Act is it mentioned that the peace, order and good government power can be invoked only in cases of emergency. It also noted that Snider did not explicitly state that Russell was wrongly decided, and Haldane's explanation was "too narrowly expressed." In addition, Russell had become a significant foundation for subsequent jurisprudence not only at the Board but also in the House of Lords.
2. Once it was decided that the 1878 Act was valid, any subsequent Act replacing it through consolidating subsequent amending Acts must be equally valid.

Viscount Simon for the Council also suggested that the federal power relating to peace, order and good government could be invoked for matters of "national concern:"

In their Lordships' opinion, the true test must be found in the real subject matter of the legislation: if it is such that it goes beyond local or provincial concern or interests and must from its inherent nature be the concern of the Dominion as a whole (as, for example, in the Aeronautics case and the Radio case), then it will fall within the competence of the Dominion Parliament as a matter affecting the peace, order and good government of Canada, though it may in another aspect touch on matters specially reserved to the provincial legislatures.

This became the foundation of the "national dimensions" test.

== Impact ==
Many decisions to follow struggled to reconcile the case with that of Russell and seem to give contradictory interpretations of the nature of "peace, order and good government." Though not expressly stated by Simon, the decision effectively overturned Russell.

The "national concern" test was subsequently applied and elaborated on in Johannesson v. West St. Paul, Munro v. National Capital Commission, and R. v. Crown Zellerbach.

== See also ==
- List of Judicial Committee of the Privy Council cases
- List of Judicial Committee of the Privy Council Cases Originating in Canada
- Ontario Temperance Act
