= Toronto Electric Commissioners v Snider =

1925 case on Canadian federal labour powers

- Court: Judicial Committee of the Privy Council
- Full case name: The Toronto Electric Commissioners v Colin G Snider and others
- Decided: 20 January 1925
- Citation: [1925] UKPC 2, [1925] AC 396 (P.C.)

Case history
- Prior actions: Toronto Electric Commissioners v. Snider, 55 O.L.R. 454
- Appealed from: Ontario Court of Appeal

Court membership
- Judges sitting: Viscount Haldane, Lord Dunedin, Lord Atkinson, Lord Wrenbury, Lord Salvesen

Case opinions
- Decision by: Viscount Haldane

Keywords
- Canadian federalism, Labour relations, Property and civil rights

Toronto Electric Commissioners v Snider is a Canadian constitutional decision of the Judicial Committee of the Privy Council where the Council struck down the federal Industrial Disputes Investigation Act, precursor to the Canada Labour Code. The Court identified matters in relation to labour to be within the exclusive competence of the province in the property and civil rights power under section 92(13) of the Constitution Act, 1867. This decision is considered one of the high-water marks of the council's interpretation of the Constitution in favour of the provinces.

== Background ==
In 1923, the employees for the Toronto Electric Commission, through the Canadian Electrical Trades Union, went on strike over working conditions and wages. The union applied under the Industrial Disputes Investigation Act to establish a dispute resolution board. The Commission asserted that this was in conflict with Ontario's Trade Disputes Act, and so applied to have the Act declared ultra vires as being beyond federal jurisdiction.

In a 4-1 decision by Ferguson J.A., the Ontario Court of Appeal held that the federal Act was constitutional, as it derived from the s. 91 powers relating to peace, order and good government, trade and commerce, and criminal law. Hodgins J.A. dissented, stating that the Act could not stand, as it did not deal with a case of:

- emergency,
- general Canadian interest or importance, or
- with any of the powers listed in s. 91.

== Opinion of the Council ==
The Ontario decision was reversed on appeal to the Privy Council. Viscount Haldane, agreeing with Hodgins' dissenting opinion, held that the Act could not be upheld under:

- the federal peace, order and good government power, as "the mere fact that Dominion legislation is for the general advantage of Canada or is such that it will meet a mere want which is felt throughout the Dominion" will not make an Act valid
- the federal trade and commerce power, as it does not extend to the regulation of a licensing system
- the criminal law power, as it does not make striking itself a crime

== Aftermath ==
After Snider, the Parliament of Canada revised the Industrial Disputes Investigation Act to restrict its application to federally incorporated companies and federally regulated industries, but also allowed it to be extended to any province by Act of its legislature. Six provinces exercised that option by 1928, and by 1932 all provinces other than Prince Edward Island had done so.

In World War II, federal jurisdiction was restored under the Wartime Labour Relations Regulations, which lasted until 1947. Afterwards, the provinces asserted their jurisdiction, and labour relations subsequently became regulated province by province, with federal authority only extending to federally regulated industries.

== Subsequent jurisprudence ==
In 1979, the Supreme Court of Canada, in Northern Telecom v. Communications Workers summarized post-Snider jurisprudence into the following principles:

1. Parliament has no authority over labour relations as such nor over the terms of a contract of employment; exclusive provincial competence is the rule.
2. By way of exception, however, Parliament may assert exclusive jurisdiction over these matters if it is shown that such jurisdiction is an integral part of its primary competence over some other single federal subject.
3. Primary federal competence over a given subject can prevent the application of provincial law relating to labour relations and the conditions of employment but only if it is demonstrated that federal authority over these matters is an integral element of such federal competence.
4. Thus, the regulation of wages to be paid by an undertaking, service or business, and the regulation of its labour relations, being related to an integral part of the operation of the undertaking, service or business, are removed from provincial jurisdiction and immune from the effect of provincial law if the undertaking, service or business is a federal one.
5. The question whether an undertaking, service or business is a federal one depends on the nature of its operation.
6. In order to determine the nature of the operation, one must look at the normal or habitual activities of the business as those of "a going concern", without regard for exceptional or casual factors; otherwise, the Constitution could not be applied with any degree of continuity and regularity.
