= Local Prohibition Case =

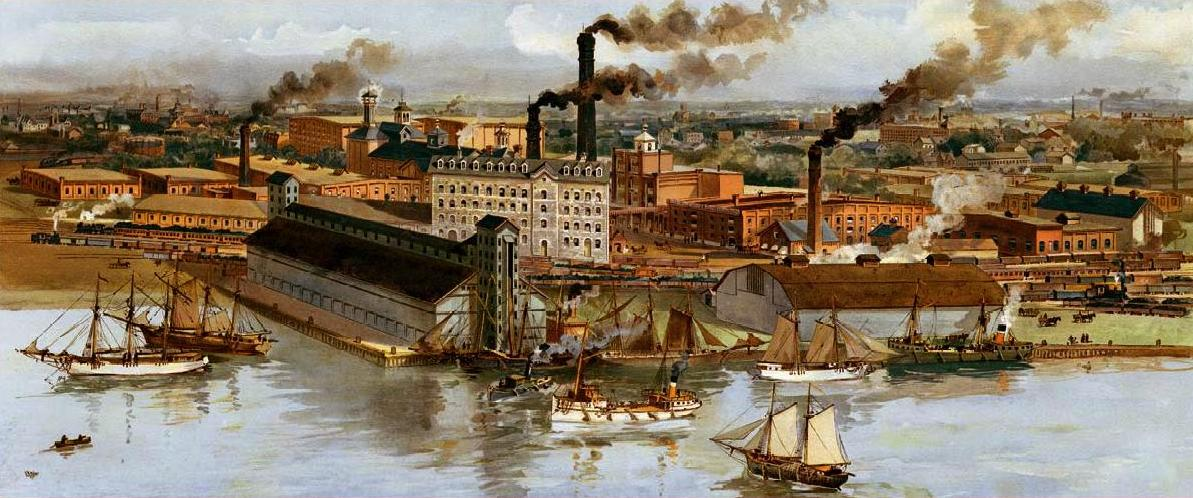
- Gooderham & Worts, Distillers of Rye Whiskey, Toronto, late 19th century
- Court: Judicial Committee of the Privy Council
- Full case name: The Attorney General for Ontario v The Attorney General for the Dominion of Canada, and the Distillers and Brewers' Association of Ontario
- Decided: 9 May 1896
- Citation: [1896] UKPC 20, [1896] AC 348

Case history
- Appealed from: Supreme Court of Canada

Court membership
- Judges sitting: The Earl of Halsbury, Lord Chancellor; Lord Herschell; Lord Watson; Lord Davey; Sir Richard Couch

Case opinions
- Decision by: Lord Watson

Ontario (AG) v Canada (AG), also known as the Local Prohibition Case, is a significant Canadian constitutional decision by the Judicial Committee of the Privy Council, at that time the highest court in the British Empire, including Canada. It was one of the first cases to enunciate core principles of the federal peace, order and good government power.

== Background ==
In addition to the scheme provided by the Canada Temperance Act for prohibiting the sale of liquor, the Legislative Assembly of Ontario passed the Local Option Act, which was virtually identical in content. In 1895, the Supreme Court of Canada issued two conflicting judgments on the matter:

- Hudson v. South Norwich (Township), where the Ontario law was upheld under the doctrine of double aspect because of provincial jurisdiction over municipal institutions, but a province could not go so far as to prohibit its manufacture and importation.
- Reference Re Provincial Jurisdiction to Pass Prohibitory Liquor Laws, where the same Act was held to be ultra vires provincial jurisdiction, as there was no authority for a province to enact prohibitory legislation.

In both cases, the majority opinions did not question the ability of the Parliament of Canada to enact legislation under its powers relating to peace, order and good government or to trade and commerce.

While both Hudson and the reference decisions were issued on the same day, the cases were heard by the Supreme Court on different dates with different members of the Court. The Court heard Hudson in May 1893, and was heard by Justices Strong, Fournier, Taschereau, Gwynne, and Sedgewick, with Justice Patterson absent. The federal government requested the reference case in October 1893, so the Court delayed issuing the Hudson decision. The reference was heard in May 1894, with newly appointed Justice King hearing the reference, and Justice Taschereau, who had a well known adversion to reference cases not sitting. Justice King became the swing vote, shifting the 3–2 majority in Hudson of Justices Strong, Fournier, Taschereau, to a 3–2 majority in the reference with Justices Gwynne, Sedgewick, and King.

Ontario appealed to the Privy Council by arguing:

1. It had jurisdiction over municipal institutions, and such institutions in Ontario possessed the power of prohibition prior to Confederation.
2. The double aspect doctrine, as articulated in Hodge v. The Queen, meant there was no conflict as the provincial law could not apply if the federal law was in force.
3. The federal power over trade and commerce had to be confined to its regulation, and not to its prohibition, thereby isolating the federal aspect to the residual clause recognized in Russell.

== Judicial Committee ==
At the Privy Council, Canada was represented by Deputy Minister of Justice and future Supreme Court of Canada Justice Edmund Leslie Newcombe, while Ontario was represented by future Privy Councillor Richard Burdon Haldane.

The Board ruled:

1. Provinces had the power to prohibit trade, but it was based on their jurisdiction over property and civil rights.
2. The double aspect doctrine applied, subject to the doctrine of paramountcy.
3. The federal power to regulate trade did not include a power to prohibit it altogether, as no specific head of power in Section 91 could encroach under any head of power assigned to the provinces under Section 92. However, such a power of prohibition could arise under the federal residual power for peace, order and good government.

Lord Watson held that the federal government's residual power allowed it to enact laws that "ought to be strictly confined to such matters as are unquestionably of Canadian interest and importance and ought not to trench upon provincial legislation with respect to any of the classes of subjects enumerated in section 92."

However, he was hesitant to apply that power, as it had the potential to destroy the autonomy of the provinces. He speculated:

If it were once conceded that the Parliament of Canada has authority to make laws applicable to the whole Dominion, in relation to matters which in each province are substantially of local or private interest, upon the assumption that these matters also concern the peace, order, and good government of the Dominion, there is hardly a subject enumerated in s. 92 upon which it might not legislate, to the exclusion of the provincial legislatures.

Lord Watson formulated a situation in which the residual power could be applied in what would become known as the "national dimensions doctrine."

Their Lordships do not doubt that some matters, in their origin local and provincial, might attain such dimensions as to affect the body politic of the Dominion, and to justify the Canadian Parliament in passing laws for their regulation or abolition in the interest of the Dominion. But great caution must be observed in distinguishing between that which is local or provincial, and therefore within the jurisdiction of the provincial legislatures, and that which has ceased to be merely local or provincial, and has become matter of national concern, in such sense as to bring it within the jurisdiction of the Parliament of Canada.

== Aftermath ==
There has been controversy as to whether it was necessary for Lord Watson to have issued such a broad ruling in this case, and to have defined the federal trade and commerce power in such a restrictive way. It has been suggested that it arose from the views of John Locke on economic liberalism, popular in the 19th century, according to which the power of the state should be focused on ensuring, by regulation, that property is being used productively. Therefore, any measure to prohibit a trade or commerce is to be discouraged.

The Supreme Court's role in issuing such conflicting decisions at the onset likely did not assist in enhancing the Supreme Court's legitimacy so shortly after its establishment in 1875.

The "national dimensions doctrine" was largely ignored for the following 40 years until it arose in its modern form in Ontario v. Canada Temperance Federation.
