= Edmund Leslie Newcombe =

Supreme Court of Canada judge (1859–1931)

The Honourable Edmund Leslie Newcombe CMG
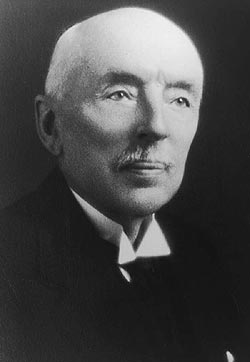

Puisne Justice of the Supreme Court of Canada
- In office September 16, 1924 – December 9, 1931
- Nominated by: William Lyon Mackenzie King
- Preceded by: Francis Alexander Anglin
- Succeeded by: Oswald Smith Crocket

Deputy Minister of Justice and Deputy Attorney General
- In office March 13, 1893 – September 15, 1924
- Preceded by: Robert Sedgewick
- Succeeded by: William Stuart Edwards

Personal details
- Born: February 17, 1859 Cornwallis, Nova Scotia
- Died: December 9, 1931 (aged 72)
- Spouse: Annie Elizabeth Freeman (m. 1887)
- Education: Dalhousie University; University of Halifax
- Profession: Lawyer, civil servant

Edmund Leslie Newcombe, CMG (February 17, 1859 – December 9, 1931) was a Canadian lawyer, civil servant, and Puisne Justice of the Supreme Court of Canada.

== Early life ==
Edmund Leslie Newcombe was born on February 17, 1859, in Cornwallis, Nova Scotia, the son of John Cumming Newcombe and Abigail H. Calkin. His father was a farmer and deacon of the Reformed Presbyterian Church who died in 1866 when Edmund was six years old. His sister, Margaret Florence Newcombe, later became the first woman to graduate from Dalhousie University and served as principal of the Halifax Ladies' College from 1911 to 1918. The Edmund could trace his family from Acadians expelled from Connecticut a century earlier.

Newcombe received a Bachelor of Arts degree from Dalhousie University in 1878 and a Master of Arts in 1881. He also earned a Bachelor of Laws degree from the short-lived University of Halifax in 1881.

== Legal career ==
Newcombe was called to the bar in January 1883. He later joined the Halifax firm of Meagher, Drysdale, and Newcombe. He remained active at Dalhousie, serving on the board of governors of Dalhousie University from 1887 to 1893, and taught a course on marine insurance at the Dalhousie Law School from 1891 to 1893.

In March 1893, Prime Minister and Minister of Justice Sir John Sparrow David Thompson, a Nova Scotian Conservative, appointed Newcombe as Deputy Minister of Justice and Deputy Attorney General, succeeding Robert Sedgewick following his appointment to the Supreme Court of Canada. That same year, Newcombe was called to the bar of Ontario and appointed Queen's Counsel.

Newcombe served as Deputy Minister of Justice for 31 years, a tenure that spanned the administrations of 11 ministers of justice and seven prime ministers. As Deputy Minister, he "was responsible for all the legal work of the government of Canada". He frequently appeared in person in front of the Supreme Court of Canada and the Judicial Committee of the Privy Council, appearing in more than thirty cases in front of the latter. Newcombe represented Canada at the Privy Council in the Local Prohibition Case (1896) across from the Ontario lawyer Richard Burdon Haldane. (Note: The Attorney General for Ontario v The Attorney General for the Dominion of Canada, and the Distillers and Brewers' Association of Ontario [1896] UKPC 20, [1896] AC 348 (9 May 1896), P.C. (on appeal from Canada)) The Privy Council ruled in favour of Ontario and provincial rights, and Newcombe would later make unsuccessful arguments before Haldane after his appointment the Privy Council.

He was appointed a Companion of the Most Distinguished Order of St Michael and St George (CMG) in 1909.

== Justice of the Supreme Court of Canada ==
On September 16, 1924, Prime Minister William Lyon Mackenzie King appointed Newcombe to the Supreme Court at the age of 65, filling the vacancy created by Chief Justice Louis Henry Davies' death. Historian Ian Bushnell notes that Newcombe was not a strong representative of the Maritimes, having resided in Ottawa for at least three decades before the appointment.

Newcombe was considered as a replacement for Chief Justice Louis Henry Davies, and his appointment was backed by Minister of Justice Ernest Lapointe. However, Prime Minister King rejected the proposal, noting that Newcombe was a conservative and there were "plenty of good men in our own [Liberal] ranks." Snell and Vaughan note that, although he was rejected for the Chief Justiceship due to his Conservative affiliations, he nonetheless enjoyed strong support within King's Liberal cabinet for appointment as a puisne justice. The appointment was generally well received, though Chief Justice of Ontario William Mulock privately criticized Newcombe for his lack of practical legal experience and that he displayed an excessively dogmatic approach to law.

Newcombe recused himself from the Persons case (1928), a reference on whether women were "persons" for the purpose of appointment to the Senate of Canada. Newcombe had written an opinion on the matter as Deputy Minister of Justice in 1921 advising the government at the time that women were not qualified under for appointment to the Senate. In the Aeronautics Reference (1930), Newcombe relied on ad coelum (property holders have rights not only to the plot of land itself, but also the air above), to hold that aviation was a matter of provincial jurisdiction. On appeal, the Privy Council held aviation as an exclusively federal matter.

Following the death of his wife in January 1931, Newcombe's health began to deteriorate. He suffered a stroke in November, and died in office three weeks later on December 9, 1931, at the age of 72. His Maritime seat on the Court was filled with the appointment of Oswald Smith Crocket of New Brunswick by Prime Minister R. B. Bennett.

== Personal life ==
On June 6, 1887, Newcombe married Annie Elizabeth Freeman in Liverpool, Nova Scotia. They had one son, Edmund Freeman Newcombe. His son suffered severe injuries during the First World War, and upon returning to Canada, he established himself as a prominent lawyer in Ottawa. Annie Newcombe died on January 28, 1931.

== Legacy ==
Newcombe's legacy is primarily rooted in his 31 years as Deputy Minister of Justice. Hector McInnes observed that "the deputy ministers really govern[ed] Canada,… for years the phrase 'Newcombe advises this' settled many a question of administrative action." His biographer, Philip Girard, described him as a highly influential figure who administered the Department of Justice in a "somewhat autocratic manner." Newcombe was not regarded as an innovative administrator.

As a justice of the Supreme Court of Canada, Newcombe's judicial philosophy was "unimaginative," however, it reflected a period of the Supreme Court described by historian Ian Bushnell as "the sterile years," where the Court's reasoning during this period was largely formulaic and conservative, likely because it still regarded itself as an intermediate appellate body to the Privy Council. In constitutional cases involving the division of powers, Newcombe slightly favoured federal government authority.

== Selected judgments ==
- Reference re Validity of the Combines Investigation Act and of s. 498 of the Criminal Code, [1929] SCR 409
