= Social Union Framework Agreement =

The Social Union Framework Agreement (SUFA) was an agreement made in Canada in 1999 between Prime Minister Jean Chrétien and the premiers of the provinces and territories of Canada, except Quebec Premier Lucien Bouchard. It concerns equality of opportunity, social programs, mobility rights and other rights.

== Background ==
According to Professor Alain Noël, the idea of a Canadian "social union" was a "fairly recent" one at the time of his writing in 1998. It emerged in the 1990s to describe economic and social policies in Canada. However, Noël notes some politicians and academics believed the social union in Canada was older, having been established at Canadian Confederation or after World War II.

Entrenching a social union into the Constitution of Canada was discussed in 1992 with a package of ultimately rejected amendments called the Charlottetown Accord. This social union was proposed by the New Democratic Party of Ontario. The social charter emphasized having common standards of social programs across Canada. Prime Minister Chrétien, coming to power in 1993, was not interested in constitutional reform, but became interested in a social union to repair Canadian federalism after the 1995 Quebec referendum on sovereignty.

== The Agreement ==
The agreement reached in 1999 recognized a number of principles and rights of Canadians, including common quality for social programs across Canada, and health care in Canada with "comprehensiveness, universality, portability, public administration and accessibility." The agreement reaffirmed mobility rights for Canadian citizens, and the governments of Canada pledged to establish "no new barriers to mobility" through "new social policy initiatives". The Agreement also stated that "nothing in this agreement abrogates or derogates from any Aboriginal, treaty or other rights of Aboriginal peoples including self-government."

Under the Agreement, new cross-Canada social programs with federal financial support may also be established with the agreement of the federal government and a majority of the provincial governments. As scholar Jennifer Smith notes, "There is no additional requirement of a population minimum" of the provinces supporting the programs. While theoretically the federal government could easily achieve new programs by appealing to "poorer provinces", particularly in Atlantic Canada, Smith notes that this view "assumes... that the poorer provinces are indiscriminate program takers."
