= Fort Frances Pulp and Paper v Manitoba Free Press =

1923 Canadian constitutional law case

- Court: Judicial Committee of the Privy Council
- Full case name: The Fort Frances Pulp and Paper Company Limited v The Manitoba Free Press Company Limited and others
- Decided: 25 July 1923
- Citation: [1923] UKPC 64, [1923] A.C. 695

Case history
- Appealed from: Appellate Division of the Supreme Court of Ontario

Court membership
- Judges sitting: Viscount Haldane, Lord Buckmaster, Lord Sumner, Lord Parmoor, Lord Phillimore

Case opinions
- Decision by: Viscount Haldane

Keywords
- emergency powers

Fort Frances Pulp and Paper v Manitoba Free Press is a decision on the Canadian Constitution by the Judicial Committee of the Privy Council on the "emergency doctrine" of the peace, order and good government power in the British North America Act, 1867.

== Background ==
During World War I, through orders in council under the War Measures Act, the Canadian government maintained strict control on the supply and price of goods. After the war had ended, the controls were continued in certain key sectors, including newsprint, under an order in council made on 20 December 1919. Controls on the supply and price of paper had been vested in the Paper Control Tribunal under an order in council made on 16 September 1918, and the Canadian Parliament passed an act in 1919 to place the Tribunal on a statutory footing for it to complete its work on all outstanding issues arising prior to the declaration of peace.

The Manitoba Free Press, a Winnipeg newspaper publisher, purchased paper from Fort Frances Pulp and Paper. Orders made by the Paper Control Tribunal on 8 July 1920 provided for a reduction of the price that had been paid, representing margins in excess of the regulated price. The Manitoba Free Press brought an action against Fort Frances in the Supreme Court of Ontario to recover the specified amount. Fort Frances counterclaimed for an amount equal to the market price of the paper, less sums that had already been paid.

== Lower courts ==
At the Trial Division, Riddell J gave judgment for the plaintiffs by holding that the orders of the Tribunal were valid. The counterclaim was consequentially dismissed. He also noted that "all the powers of the Minister, Controller and Tribunal were intra vires and valid, even in a state of profound peace."

The trial judge's ruling was upheld on appeal to the Appellate Division although it considered that the question was one of contract, as Fort Frances had issued invoices at the specified prices and the Free Press had paid them on the basis that the prices were provisional and subject to orders to be made by the Paper Control Tribunal. As a result, it was not necessary to question the validity of those orders.

Fort Frances appealed the ruling to the Privy Council.

== Privy Council ==
The judgment was upheld although the Board noted that it preferred the trial judge's reasoning to that of the appeal court. However, it did not necessarily agree with Riddell J's view as to how far the federal power could extend.

Viscount Haldane held that it was not in the Board's power to determine if there was a "national emergency" and that it was entirely in the authority of the Canadian Parliament to determine its existence. Relying on its recent ruling in the Board of Commerce case, he stated that an emergency is determined by common sense and that since World War I was clearly a "national emergency," there was sufficient reason to invoke the "emergency doctrine:"

That the basic instrument on which the character of the entire constitution depends should be construed as providing for such centralised power in an emergency situation follows from the manifestation in the language of the Act of the principle that the instrument has among its purposes to provide for the State regarded as a whole, and for the expression and influence of its public opinion as such.

Nonetheless, any use of the emergency power must be temporary. However, it was for the federal government to decide when the state of emergency was over:

...very clear evidence that the crisis has wholly passed away would be required to justify the judiciary, even when the question raised was one of ultra vires which it had to decide, in overruling the decision of the Government that exceptional measures were still requisite.

In that regard, the Board agreed with a recent ruling of the US Supreme Court on the question, which is notable as being the first of only two times that the Board cited the decisions of that court.

== Impact ==
This decision, like many others of its time, completely ignored the "national concern" doctrine established earlier in Russell v. The Queen, but it was significant in explaining how far the "emergency doctrine" could extend in times of emergency and effectively incorporating the principle of salus populi est suprema lex. Haldane noted:

•...it does not follow that in a very different case, such as that of sudden danger to social order arising from the outbreak of a great war, the Parliament of the Dominion cannot act under other powers which may well be implied in the constitution. The reasons given in the Board of Commerce Case recognize exceptional cases where such a power may be implied.

Therefore, in time of an emergency, provincial powers can be overridden for the peace, order and good government of Canada as a whole. In addition, the discretion given to the Parliament of Canada as to how long an emergency continues was exercised again in the period after World War II.
