= Radio Reference =

Canadian constitutional case in the JCPC

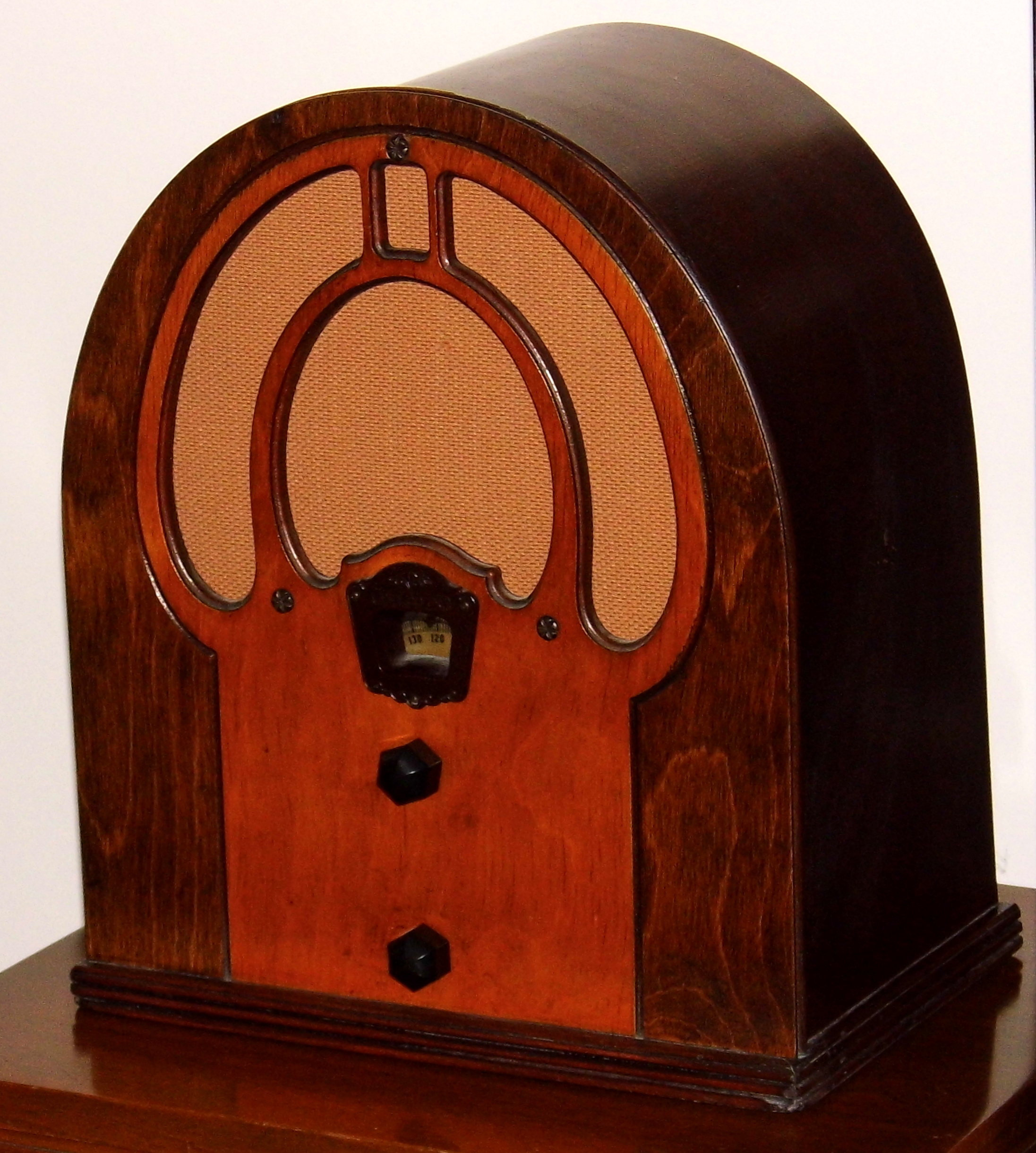
- A radio from the 1930s
- Court: Judicial Committee of the Privy Council
- Full case name: The Attorney General of Quebec v The Attorney General of Canada and others
- Decided: 9 February 1932
- Citations: [1932] UKPC 7 (BAILII), [1932] AC 304, [1932] 2 DLR 81, [1932] 1 WWR 563, 39 CRC 49

Case history
- Prior actions: Reference re Regulation and Control of Radio Communication, 1931 CanLII 83, [1931] SCR 541 (30 June 1931)
- Appealed from: Supreme Court of Canada

Court membership
- Judges sitting: Viscount Dunedin, Lord Blanesburgh, Lord Merrivale, Lord Russell of Killowen, Sir George Lowndes

Case opinions
- Decision by: Viscount Dunedin

Keywords
- Broadcasting

Quebec (AG) v Canada (AG), also known as the Radio Reference, is a decision of the Judicial Committee of the Privy Council that determined that broadcasting fell within the jurisdiction of the Parliament of Canada under the British North America Act, 1867.

== Background ==
When the British North America Act, 1867 was originally drafted, broadcasting had not yet been invented. By the 1920s, Canada had already entered into international agreements on the subject, and there was intense debate as to which level of government in Canada had jurisdiction to regulate this field. Quebec decided to pose reference questions to its appellate court on the matter, and the federal government decided to preempt that hearing by posing the following questions to the Supreme Court of Canada:

1. Has the Parliament of Canada jurisdiction to regulate and control radio communication, including the transmission and reception of signs, signals, pictures and sounds of all kinds by means of Hertzian waves, and including the right to determine the character, use and location of apparatus employed?
2. If not, in what particular or particulars or to what extent is the jurisdiction of Parliament limited?

== Initial ruling by the Supreme Court of Canada ==
In a 3–2 decision, the SCC held that radio communication is subject to the legislative jurisdiction of the Dominion Parliament. In his opinion, Anglin C.J.C. supported the statement by Newcombe J. that:

I interpret the reference as meant to submit the questions for consideration in the light of the existing situation and the knowledge and use of the art, as practically understood and worked, and, having regard to what is stated in the case, assumed as the basis for the hearing. Therefore I proceed upon the assumption that radio communication in Canada is practically Dominion-wide; that the broadcasting of a message in a province, or in a territory of Canada, has its effect in making the message receivable as such, and is also effective by way of interference, not only within the local political area within which the transmission originates, but beyond, for distances exceeding the limits of a province, and that, consequently, if there is to be harmony or reasonable measure of utility or success in the service, it is desirable, if not essential, that the operations should be subject to prudent regulation and control.

and thus noted:

On the other hand, if the Act is to be viewed, as recently suggested by their Lordships of the Privy Council in Edwards v. Attorney-General of Canada as a living tree, capable of growth and expansion within its natural limits, and if it should be on all occasions interpreted in a large, liberal and comprehensive spirit, considering the magnitude of the subjects with which it purports to deal in very few words, and bearing in mind that we are concerned with the interpretation of an Imperial Act, but an Imperial Act creating a constitution for a new country, every effort should be made to find in the B.N.A. Act some head of legislative jurisdiction capable of including the subject matter of this reference. If, however, it should be found impossible to assign that subject matter to any specifically enumerated head of legislative jurisdiction, either in section 91 or in section 92 of the B.N.A. Act, it would seem to be one of the subjects of residuary power under the general jurisdiction conferred on the Dominion by the opening paragraph of section 91.

Therefore, radio broadcasting could not be considered to be a matter of a local or private nature, but more properly fell within the definition of "telegraphs" in Section 92(10).

Smith J. also concurred. In dissenting opinions, Rinfret J. and Lamont J. held that the Parliament of Canada did not have jurisdiction to legislate on the subject of radio communication in every respect. It fell within the primary legislative jurisdiction of the provinces either under property and civil rights or under local works and undertakings of section 92 of the B.N.A. Act, except in cases where the Dominion Parliament has superseding jurisdiction under some of the heads of section 91 and under section 132 (relating to treaties) of the B.N.A. Act.

== Appeal to the Privy Council ==
The Privy Council, in a ruling delivered by Viscount Dunedin, held that the reasoning of the majority at the SCC was correct. He noted the following reasons why the minority opinions failed:

- unlike in the Aeronautics Reference, the treaty power under section 132 was not relevant, as the international agreements in question were not treaties of the British Empire, but only entered into by Canada
- Canada's obligations under its agreements in this field required it to pass legislation that would apply to all the dwellers in Canada
- no distinction can be made between the operation of the transmitting and receiving instruments
- radio broadcasting could be seen to be similar to "telegraphs" and to "other Works and Undertakings connecting the Province with any other or others of the Provinces, or extending beyond the Limits of the Province", both of which are excepted matters reserved to federal jurisdiction under section 92(10)
- as the Section 91 claims were preeminent, it was unnecessary to consider whether broadcasting could fall under property and civil rights or matters of a local or private nature under Section 92

Accordingly, the appeal was dismissed.

== Impact ==
Federal jurisdiction over radio broadcasting was later held to include television broadcasting and cable television systems. However, broadcasting has been held not to include the operations of internet service providers.

The question of whether federal jurisdiction over broadcasting includes control of the content of broadcasting has also been answered by the courts. In Re C.F.R.D. and Attorney-General of Canada et al., Justice Kelly affirmed the federal government's authority to regulate programme content. Chief Justice Laskin delivered the opinion of the Supreme Court in Capital Cities Communications v. CRTC. The Court concluded that programme content regulation is inseparable from regulating the undertaking through which programmes are received and sent on as part of the total enterprise.

It appears, therefore, that the decision handed down in the Radio Reference case has subsequently been interpreted to include federal government authority to regulate all facets of the broadcasting industry, including content. Parliament, through its regulatory agency, has used this power in an attempt to create and maintain a national broadcasting system that would"contribute to the development of national unity and provide for a continuing expression of Canadian identity" The Canadian content regulations are merely one aspect of the means accepted to achieve that end.
