= Hodge v The Queen =

Canadian constitutional law case – 1883

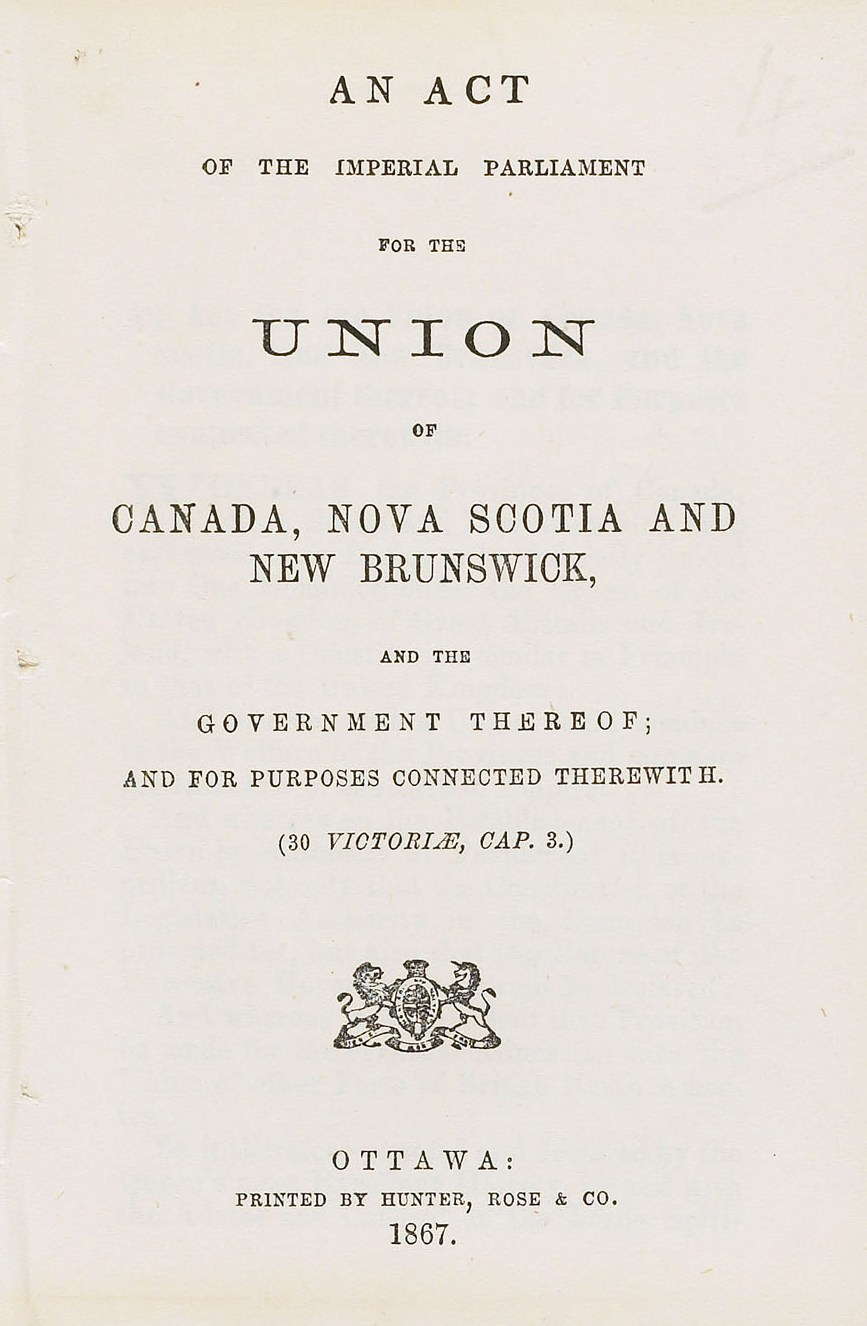
- Cover page of the British North America Act, 1867
- Court: Judicial Committee of the Privy Council
- Decided: 15 December 1883
- Citation: [1883] UKPC 59, 9 AC 117

Case history
- Appealed from: Court of Appeal of Ontario

Court membership
- Judges sitting: Lord FitzGerald; Sir Barnes Peacock; Sir Robert P. Collier; Sir Richard Couch; Sir Arthur Hobhouse

Case opinions
- Decision by: Sir Barnes Peacock

Keywords
- Plenary provincial legislative power; double aspect, matters of a local or private nature

Hodge v The Queen is a Canadian constitutional law decision of the Judicial Committee of the Privy Council in 1883, at that time the highest court of appeal in the British Empire, including Canada. It was decided under the British North America Act, 1867, now known as the Constitution Act, 1867.

The case was the first time that the Judicial Committee considered the constitutional status of the provincial legislatures as a general matter of principle, rather than the case-by-case analysis that had been used up to that point. The Judicial Committee held that the provincial legislatures, and the federal Parliament, both had extremely broad powers of legislation within their respective areas, on par with the British Parliament itself. The legislatures and Parliament were not mere delegates of the British Parliament, but plenary legislative bodies, subject only to the limits on their powers set out in the British North America Act, 1867.

The case is also significant because it was the first time the Judicial Committee set out the constitutional principle of double aspect under the division of powers between the federal Parliament and the provincial legislatures. The "double aspect" doctrine recognises that an activity may have some aspects that come within federal jurisdiction, while other aspects of the activity may come within provincial jurisdiction. Both federal and provincial laws can therefore apply to that activity, provided the laws remain within their respective constitutional boundaries.

As a result, the Judicial Committee upheld the provincial law in issue, the Liquor Licence Act of Ontario, and confirmed the conviction of Archibald Hodge under that act.

== Background ==
In 1876, the Ontario Legislature passed the Liquor Licence Act. The sale of alcohol was a hotly contested issue at the time, with strong advocates for prohibition (the "drys"), and equally strong advocates for the public sale of alcohol (the "wets"). The act transferred control over alcohol sales from the municipalities to provincially appointed local licence commissioners. It was a controversial change, and the act became known as the Crooks Act, after the Provincial Treasurer, Adam Crooks, who piloted the act through the Legislative Assembly. The act gave the liquor commissioners the power to set extensive terms and conditions on the sale of alcohol.

The liquor licence commissioners appointed for the city of Toronto passed regulations under the Act. One of the conditions was that billiard tables could not be used in the premises during the time when the sale of liquor was prohibited, namely from 7 o'clock on Saturday evening until 6 o'clock in the morning on the following Monday.

Archibald Hodge was licensed to sell liquor in his tavern, and was also licensed to operate a billiard saloon. In May 1881, he was convicted by a magistrate for allowing a billiard table to be used during the hours when the sale of liquor was prohibited, after 7 o'clock in the evening on a Saturday, contrary to the act and regulations. He was fined $20 and required to pay $2.50 to the informant. Failing payment of the fines, the sheriff could execute the fines by distress on his goods and chattels, and if that was not sufficient to cover the fines, he was liable to 15 days of imprisonment in the "common gaol" of the city of Toronto, with hard labour.

== Decisions of the Canadian courts ==
=== Ontario Court of Queen's Bench ===
Hodge then sued in the Court of Queen's Bench to have the conviction quashed, on the grounds that:

1. the resolution of the Licence Commissioners was illegal and unauthorized,
2. the Licence Commissioners had no authority to pass such a resolution, and
3. the Liquor Licence Act was ultra vires provincial jurisdiction.

In June 1881, the Court of Queen's Bench, in a unanimous ruling, quashed the conviction. In his judgment for the court, Chief Justice Hagarty held, with Justices Armour and Cameron concurring, commented that the Legislature of Ontario was "not acting under an original jurisdiction, but under the special authority given to it by the Confederation Act". He concluded that the Legislature could not delegate the authority to create offences to another body, in this case the liquor licence commissioners, because the delegation exceeded the "special power" granted by the British North America Act, 1867.

=== Court of Appeal for Ontario ===
The Crown appealed to the Court of Appeal for Ontario, raising two questions: whether the Legislature of Ontario have the authority to enact the provisions in issue, including the penalties, and whether it could delegate those powers to the Board of Commissioners. In June 1882, the Court of Appeal reversed the Queen's Bench decision and affirmed the conviction. The decision of the court was set out in reasons by Chief Justice Spragge and Justice Burton, with Justices Patterson and Morrison concurring. The Court of Appeal held that the Assembly had jurisdiction to legislate in the matter and that it could delegate its authority to another body.

== Decision of the Judicial Committee ==
=== Hearing before the Judicial Committee ===
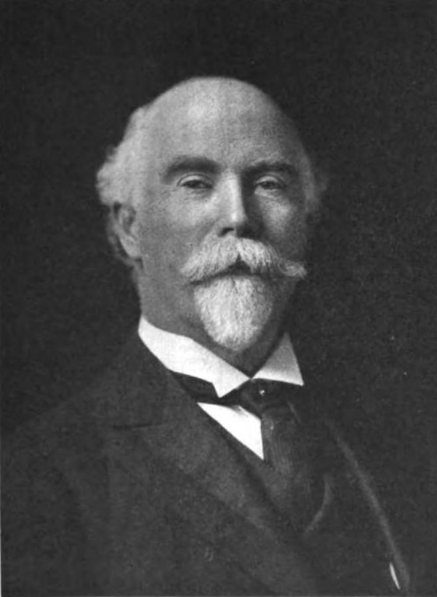
James Kerr, QC, who acted for Hodge

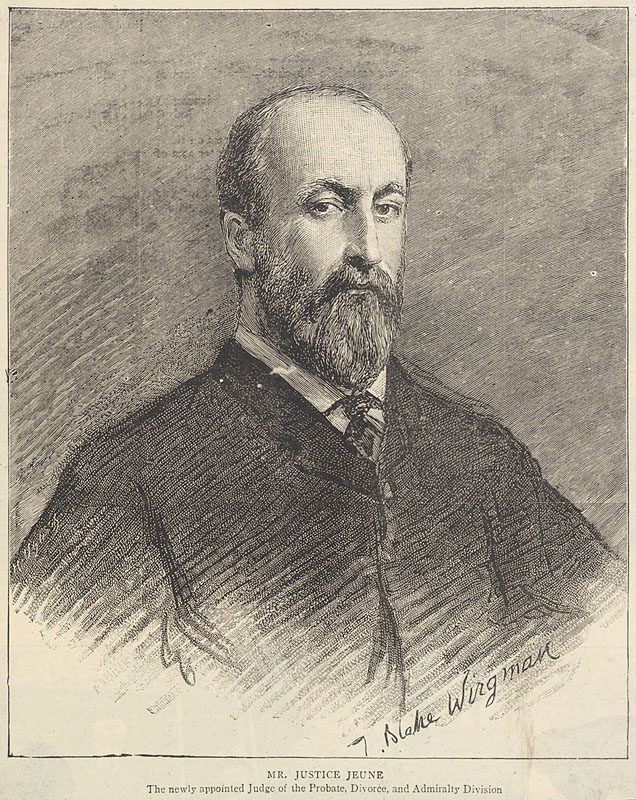
Francis Jeune, also acting for Hodge

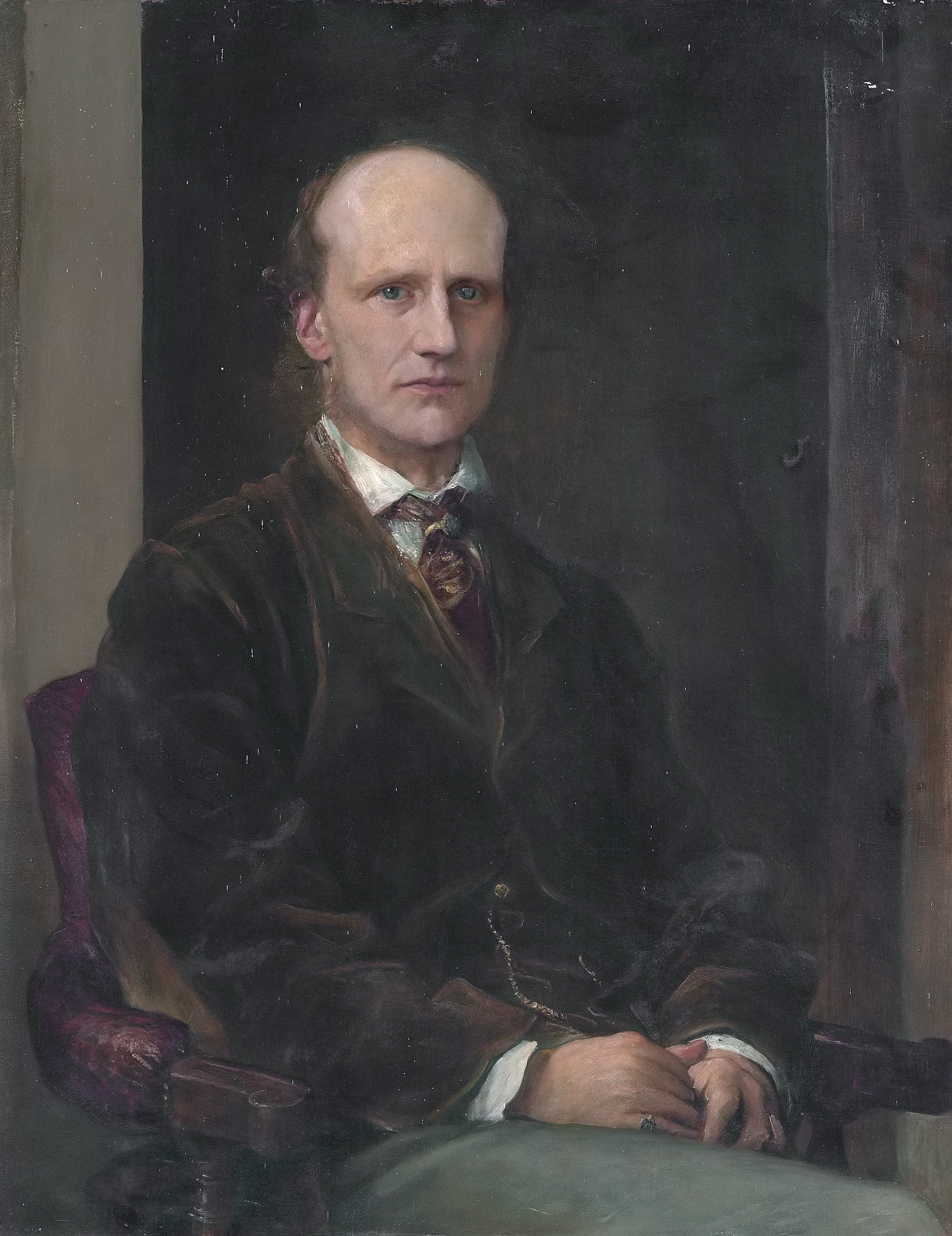
Horace Davey, QC, lead counsel for the Crown

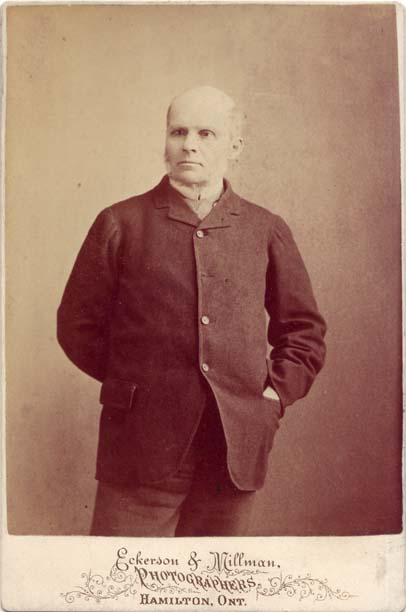
Æmilius Irving, QC, also acting for the Crown

Hodge appealed to the Judicial Committee of the Privy Council, bypassing the Supreme Court of Canada. At that time, the Judicial Committee was the final court of appeal for the British Empire, including Canada. Hodge was represented by James Kirkpatrick Kerr, QC, of the Ontario bar, and Francis Jeune of the English bar. The Crown as respondent was represented by Horace Davey, QC, of the English bar, and Æmilius Irving, QC, of the Ontario bar, with the assistance of an English junior counsel.

The Judicial Committee heard the appeal over three days (November 14, 15, 16, 1883) and gave its decision on December 15, 1883. The committee upheld the decision of the Ontario Court of Appeal. The decision was given by Sir Barnes Peacock. As was the practice of the Judicial Committee at that time, there were no dissenting reasons from other members of the committee.

=== Status of the provincial legislature ===
Peacock first addressed the question whether the Legislature could delegate the power to make regulations to the liquor commissioners. This issue was important because of the legal principle that a delegate of powers cannot then sub-delegate those powers, summarised by the legal maxim, delegatus non potest delegare ("one to whom power is delegated cannot himself further delegate that power"). That in turn required consideration of the nature of the grant of legislative authority to the provincial legislature in the Constitution Act, 1867. Hodge's counsel argued that the legislature was simply a delegate of the British Parliament, and therefore could not sub-delegate its legislative powers to the liquor commissioners.

Peacock rejected that argument, and held that the provincial legislatures, and also the federal Parliament, were not delegates of the British Parliament:

It appears to their Lordships, however, that the objection thus raised by the appellants is founded on an entire misconception of the true character and position of the provincial legislatures. They are in no sense delegates of or acting under any mandate from the Imperial Parliament. When the British North America Act enacted that there should be a legislature for Ontario, and that its legislative assembly should have exclusive authority to make laws for the Province and for provincial purposes in relation to the matters enumerated in sect. 92, it conferred powers not in any sense to be exercised by delegation from or as agents of the Imperial Parliament, but authority as plenary and as ample within the limits prescribed by sect. 92 as the Imperial Parliament in the plenitude of its power possessed and could bestow. Within these limits of subjects and area the local legislature is supreme, and has the same authority as the Imperial Parliament, or the Parliament of the Dominion, would have had under like circumstances to confide to a municipal institution or body of its own creation authority to make by-laws or resolutions as to subjects specified in the enactment, and with the object of carrying the enactment into operation and effect.

=== Double aspect doctrine ===
Peacock examined the pith and substance of the law that delegated the power to the commission. It was noted that:

the powers intended to be conferred by the Act in question, when properly understood, are to make regulations in the nature of police or municipal regulations of a merely local character for the good government of taverns... and such as are calculated to preserve, in the municipality, peace and public decency, and repress drunkenness and disorderly and riotous conduct.

The Act, however, also touched on powers that were exclusively in the authority of the federal government, as had been recently determined in Russell v. The Queen. Peacock distinguished that fact with what is now the doctrine of double aspect: "subjects which in one aspect and for one purpose fall within sect. 92, may in another aspect and for another purpose fall within sect. 91."

Consequently, when a law has some overlapping characteristics between the two heads of power, it may still be valid.

== Significance of the decision ==
This case is included in the three volume set of significant decisions of the Judicial Committee on the construction and interpretation of the British North America Act, 1867 (now the Constitution Act, 1867), prepared on the direction of the then Minister of Justice and Attorney General, Stuart Sinclair Garson, QC. He directed that the Department of Justice prepare the collection "for the convenience of the Bench and Bar in Canada", following the abolition of Canadian appeals to the Judicial Committee. This case was included in the first volume of the set.

The decision in Hodge was viewed favourably by those within the provincial rights movement, and lieutenant governor of Ontario John Beverley Robinson was reported to have stated at the opening of the legislature that the Privy Council had safeguarded the autonomy of the provinces with Hodge.

== See also ==
- List of Canadian appeals to the Judicial Committee of the Privy Council, 1880–1889
