= Russell v The Queen =

1882 Canadian constitutional law case

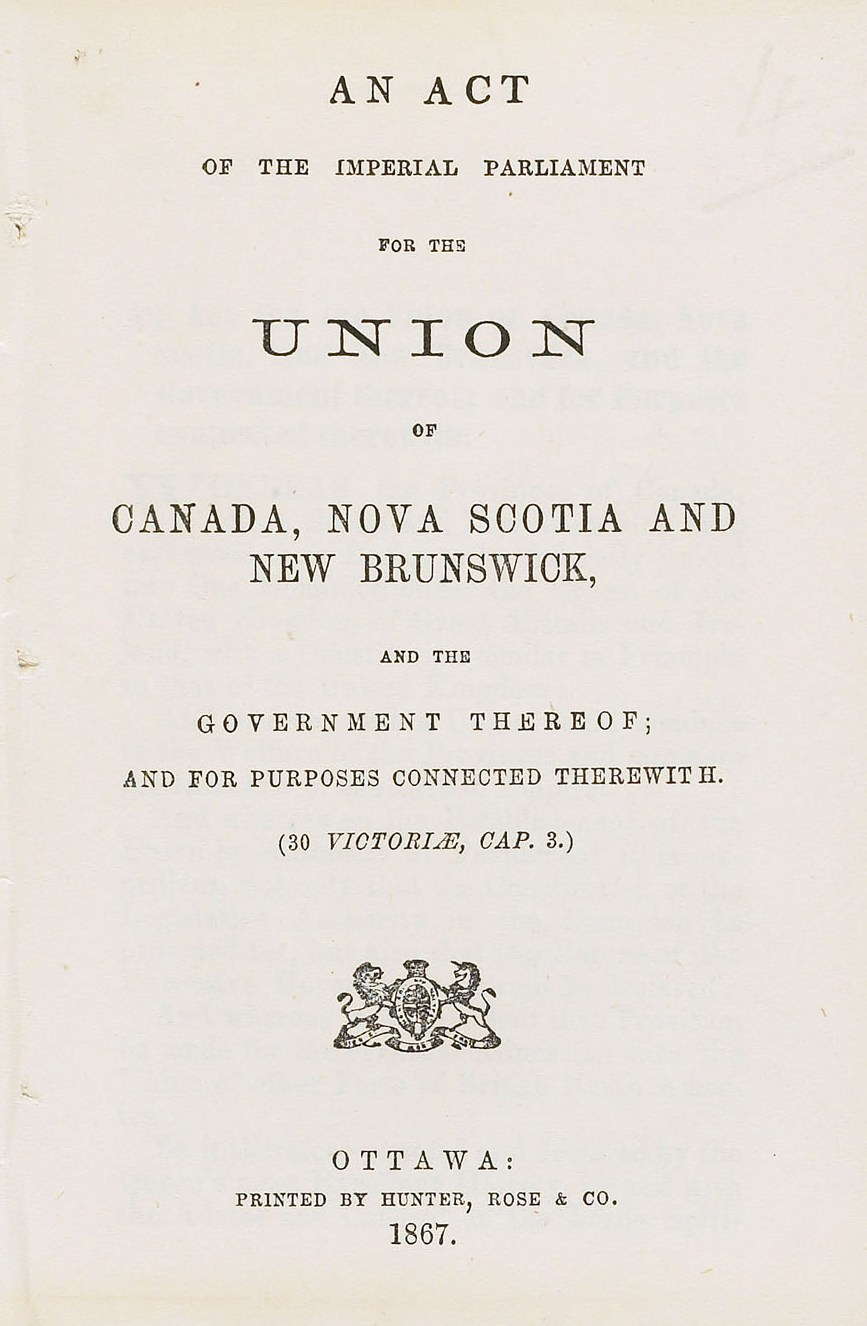
- First case considering the federal "peace, order and good government" power
- Court: Judicial Committee of the Privy Council
- Full case name: Charles Russell v The Queen
- Decided: 23 June 1882
- Citations: [1882] UKPC 33, 7 App.Cas. 829, 8 CRAC 502

Case history
- Prior actions: City of Fredericton v The Queen (1880), 3 SCR 505, 2 Cart 27
- Appealed from: Supreme Court of New Brunswick

Court membership
- Judges sitting: Sir Barnes Peacock; Sir Montague Smith; Sir Robert P. Collier; Sir James Hannen; Sir Richard Couch

Case opinions
- Decision by: Sir Montague Smith

Keywords
- temperance, peace, order and good government, constitutional interpretation

Russell v The Queen is a Canadian constitutional law decision dealing with the power of the federal Parliament. The case was decided in 1882 by the Judicial Committee of the Privy Council, at that time the highest court in the British Empire, including Canada. The Judicial Committee held that the Canada Temperance Act was valid federal legislation under the peace, order and good government power, set out in section 91 of the Constitution Act, 1867. The case expanded upon the jurisprudence that was previously discussed in Citizen's Insurance Co. v. Parsons.

The underlying issue in the case was whether alcohol regulation was a matter of importance to the country as a whole, and therefore under federal jurisdiction, or whether it was a local matter, subject to provincial jurisdiction. The Canada Temperance Act asserted federal jurisdiction, but implemented on a local basis. The Judicial Committee upheld the validity of the federal statute.

Russell has been criticised by commentators over the past century as being an outlier in the case-law regarding the "peace, order and good government" power, but has never been formally overruled. The case is included in a collection of significant constitutional decisions from the Judicial Committee, published by the federal Department of Justice.

== Background ==
In 1878, the Parliament of Canada passed the Canada Temperance Act which allowed a province or city to hold a plebiscite on banning the sale of alcohol. Fredericton, New Brunswick, held such a plebiscite, which carried successfully.

In 1880, the Supreme Court of Canada decision in City of Fredericton v The Queen held that the law was intra vires under the federal trade and commerce power. That decision was not appealed.

In a separate case two years later, Charles Russell, a local pub owner, was convicted under the Canada Temperance Act of selling alcohol. The prosecution had been brought by a private prosecutor, who was not an agent of the Attorney General of New Brunswick. The conviction was affirmed by the New Brunswick Supreme Court en banc, which followed the decision of the Supreme Court of Canada and held that the act was constitutionally valid.

== Appeal to the Judicial Committee ==
Russell then appealed to the Judicial Committee of the Privy Council in Britain, the highest court of the British Empire. At that time, appeals could go directly to the Judicial Committee from the provincial appellate courts, bypassing the Supreme Court of Canada.

Russell was represented by Judah Benjamin (former Attorney General of the Confederate States of America). Benjamin argued that Parliament cannot delegate its powers to any other part of government. The law could best be characterized as either falling into the provincial power to legislate on matters related to taverns and saloons (section 92(9) of the Constitution Act, 1867), property and civil rights (section 92(13)), or matters of a local or private nature (section 92(16)).

Sir Montague Edward Smith gave the decision for the Judicial Committee. He rejected these submissions, saying:

Their Lordships cannot concur in this view. The declared object of Parliament in passing the Act is that there should be uniform legislation in all the provinces respecting the traffic in intoxicating liquors, with a view to promote temperance in the Dominion. Parliament does not treat the promotion of temperance as desirable in one province more than in another, but as desirable everywhere throughout the Dominion.

Smith upheld the law as a valid exercise of federal power under the doctrine of "peace, order and good government" which means that any law that cannot be found to be allocated to the provincial head of power under section 92 must necessarily fall into the residual power granted to the federal government. The law was found to be in relation to public order and safety, and thus was a matter of general concern to all of Canada. As to the manner of its operation, Smith noted:

The manner of bringing the prohibitions and penalties of the Act into force, which Parliament has thought fit to adopt, does not alter its general and uniform character. Parliament deals with the subject as one of general and uniform concern to the Dominion, upon which uniformity of legislation is desirable, and the Parliament alone can so deal with it.

As the issue was decided to fall under the general nature of the "peace, order and good government" power, it was considered unnecessary to determine whether it could have come under a more specific head of federal power. In the closing paragraph of the decision, Smith stated the fact that he did not comment on the reasons of the Supreme Court in the earlier case did not mean that the Committee disagreed with the Supreme Court's reasons.

As was the practice of the Judicial Committee at that time, Smith gave the decision for the entire committee, with no reasons from any of the other judges.

== Impact ==
Although the Canada Temperance Act was upheld, the effect of Russell was to restrict the manner in which the more specific heads of federal power were to be interpreted. In the subsequent case of Hodge v. The Queen, followed by others from the Privy Council, the influence of the Supreme Court of Canada diminished and that of the provinces was significantly expanded.

Russell continued to govern the interpretation of the peace, order and good government power until it was effectively overturned by Ontario (Attorney General) v. Canada Temperance Federation in 1946.

This case is included in the three volume set of significant decisions of the Judicial Committee on the construction and interpretation of the Constitution Act, 1867, prepared on the direction of the then Minister of Justice and Attorney General, Stuart Sinclair Garson. Following the abolition of Canadian appeals to the Judicial Committee, Garson directed that the Department of Justice prepare the collection "for the convenience of the Bench and Bar in Canada". This case was included in the first volume of the set.

== See also ==
- List of Canadian appeals to the Judicial Committee of the Privy Council
