= Reference Re Canada Assistance Plan (BC) =

- Supreme Court of Canada

Hearing: December 11, 12, 1990 Judgment: August 15, 1991
- Citations: [1991] 2 S.C.R. 525
- Docket No.: 22017

Court membership
- Chief Justice: Antonio Lamer; Puisne Justices: Bertha Wilson, Gérard La Forest, Claire L'Heureux-Dubé, John Sopinka, Charles Gonthier, Peter Cory, Beverley McLachlin, William Stevenson

Reasons given
- Unanimous reasons by: Sopinka J.

Reference Re Canada Assistance Plan (BC), [1991] 2 S.C.R. 525 is a leading constitutional decision of the Supreme Court of Canada. The Court held that courts have a residual discretion to refuse to answer reference questions where there is insufficient legal content or where the court would be unable to provide a complete and accurate answer.

== Background ==
Under the Canada Assistance Plan (a federal-provincial fiscal arrangement) the Parliament of Canada was contributing 50 per cent of the costs for social assistance and welfare in the province of British Columbia. sec. 8 of the Plan provided that the agreements entered between the federal Govt and the provinces to this respect would continue in force as long as the relevant provincial law was in operation, subject to termination by consent, or unilaterally by either party on a year's notice.

In 1990, Federal Government introduced a bill that provided a cap on Ontario, BC and Alberta. The Lieutenant Governor in Council of British Columbia, referred to the British Columbia Court of Appeal two constitutional questions to determine:

1. whether the Government of Canada has any authority to limit its obligation under the Plan and its Agreement with British Columbia;
2. whether the terms of the Agreement, the subsequent conduct of the Government of Canada pursuant to the Agreement and the provisions of the Plan give rise to a legitimate expectation that the Government of Canada would introduce no bill into Parliament to limit its obligation under the Agreement or the Plan without the consent of British Columbia.

The Court of Appeal answered the first question in the negative and the second question in the affirmative.

== Reasons of the court ==
The Court held that the issue was justiciable as there was a legal component to it. On the facts the Court found that the federal policy was constitutionally valid. The Court held that the power to enact, repeal, or amend Acts is well within the Parliamentary sphere. The Court also looked at the Interpretation Act which explicitly states these powers. Ultimately, the Court relied on the Interpretation Act in its decision, although it stated that the Parliament would not have been precluded from exercising its powers in the absence thereof.

== Procedural fairness ==
It was argued by the Province that the Federal Government created a legitimate expectation by the language in the statute. The province alleged that an amendment required Provincial consent before a change was made to the statute. Justice Sopinka held that requiring the consent of the Province before allowing Parliament to amend the statute would produce a substantive outcome. The doctrine of legitimate expectations can only operate to provide procedural remedies.

== See also ==
- List of Supreme Court of Canada cases (Lamer Court)
