= Aeronautics Reference =

Canadian constitutional law case in the JCPC

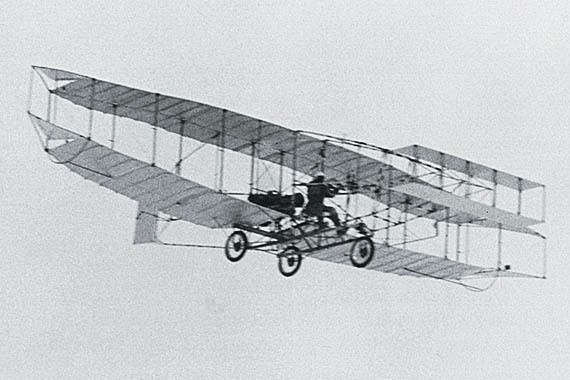
- Court: Judicial Committee of the Privy Council
- Full case name: The Attorney-General Canada v The Attorney-General of Ontario and others
- Decided: 22 October 1931
- Citations: [1931] UKPC 93 (BAILII), [1932] AC 54, [1932] 1 DLR 58, [1931] 3 WWR 625, 39 CRC 108

Case history
- Prior actions: Reference re legislative powers as to regulation and control of aeronautics in Canada, 1930 CanLII 79, [1930] SCR 663 (7 October 1930)
- Appealed from: Supreme Court of Canada

Court membership
- Judges sitting: The Lord Chancellor, Viscount Dunedin, Lord Atkin, Lord Russell of Killowen, Lord Macmillan

Case opinions
- Decision by: The Lord Chancellor

Keywords
- Aeronautics

Canada (AG) v Ontario (AG), also known as In re the Regulation and Control of Aeronautics in Canada and the Aeronautics Reference, is a decision of the Judicial Committee of the Privy Council on the interpretation of the Canadian Constitution. Lord Sankey decided in the case that the federal government has the authority to govern the subject of aeronautics, including licensing of pilots, aircraft, and commercial services and regulations for navigation and safety.

== Background ==
As part of the negotiations at the Paris Peace Conference, the Paris Convention of 1919 set up an international framework for regulation of aerial navigation. It was drawn up and signed by all parties, including Canada. It was ratified on behalf of the British Empire in 1922, and the Parliament of Canada subsequently passed legislation on the matter. In a federal-provincial conference in 1927, questions were raised as to whether there really was federal jurisdiction to regulate this field.

The following reference questions were posed to the Supreme Court of Canada:

1. Have the Parliament and Government of Canada exclusive legislative and executive authority for performing the obligations of Canada, or of any province thereof, under the Convention entitled Convention relating to the Regulation of Aerial Navigation?
2. Is legislation of the Parliament of Canada providing for the regulation and control of aeronautics generally within Canada, including flying operations carried on entirely within the limits of a province, necessary or proper for performing the obligations of Canada, or of any province thereof, under the Convention aforementioned, within the meaning of section 132 of the British North America Act, 1867?
3. Has the Parliament of Canada legislative authority to enact, in whole or in part, the provisions of section 4 of the Aeronautics Act, chapter 3, Revised Statutes of Canada, 1927?
4. Has the Parliament of Canada legislative authority to sanction the making and enforcement, in whole or in part of the regulations contained in the Air Regulations, 1920, respecting—

(а) The granting of certificates or licences authorizing persons to act as pilots, navigators, engineers or inspectors of aircraft and the suspension or revocation of such licences;
(b) The regulation, identification, inspection, certification, and licensing of all aircraft; and
(c) The licensing, inspection and regulation of all aerodromes and air stations?

== Reference to the Supreme Court of Canada ==
In its ruling, the SCC answered the questions as follows:

1 & 2. The Parliament of Canada did not gain exclusive authority to regulate the matter under s. 132, but its authority to enforce the Convention's obligations is paramount. It also possesses incidental power to regulate aeronautics under the powers relating to trade and commerce, postal services, defence, and naturalization and aliens, but not under navigation and shipping. The provinces have authority to regulate intraprovincial aviation under s. 92.

3 & 4. Yes, in part

The Attorney General of Canada appealed the ruling with respect to Questions 1, 3 and 4. Question 2 was not formally appealed because of its political nature, but it was conceded in argument that the ruling on the other questions would be sufficient to answer it.

== Appeal to the Privy Council ==
The SCC ruling was reversed on appeal, and the Privy Council answered "Yes" with respect to all three questions. The relevant clauses in the British North America, 1867 that were held to cover the entire field of aeronautics were:

- s.91(2), relating to trade and commerce,
- s.91(5), regarding postal services,
- s.91(7), on militia and defence, and
- s.132, for enforcing international obligations arising from a treaty by the British Empire.

The Privy Council also observed that the real object of the British North America Act, 1867 was to "give the central Government those high functions and almost sovereign powers to which uniformity of legislation might be secured on all questions which were of common concern to all the Provinces as members of a constituent whole." The division of responsibilities between federal and provincial jurisdictions was summarized as follows by Lord Sankey:

1. The legislation of the Parliament of the Dominion, so long as it strictly relates to subjects of legislation expressly enumerated in section 91, is of paramount authority, even if it trenches upon matters assigned to the Provincial Legislature by section 92.
2. The general power of legislation conferred up on the Parliament of the Dominion by section 91 of the Act in supplement of the power to legislate upon the subjects expressly enumerated must be strictly confined to such matters as are unquestionably of national interest and importance, and must not trench on any of the subjects enumerated in section 92, as within the scope of Provincial legislation, unless these matters have attained such dimensions as to affect the body politic of the Dominion.
3. It is within the competence of the Dominion Parliament to provide for matters which though otherwise within the legislative competence of the Provincial Legislature, are necessarily incidental to effective legislation by the Parliament of the Dominion upon a subject of legislation expressly enumerated in section 91.
4. There can be a domain in which Provincial and Dominion legislation may overlap, in which case, neither legislation will be ultra vires if the field is clear, but if the field is not clear and the two legislations meet, the Dominion legislation must prevail.

== Aftermath ==
Although the underlying Convention was denounced and replaced by a new international convention in 1944 that was not a treaty of the British Empire, it was held in Johannesson v West St. Paul that, in accordance with Ontario v Canada Temperance Federation, the field continued to be within federal jurisdiction under the power relating to peace, order and good government, as by then it had attained a national dimension.

== See also ==
- History of aviation in Canada
