= R v Crown Zellerbach Canada Ltd =

- Supreme Court of Canada

Hearing: June 26, 1986 Judgment: March 24, 1988
- Citations: [1988] 1 SCR 401, 49 DLR (4th) 161
- Prior history: Act found ultra vires at trial, BCCA dismissed appeal
- Ruling: Act is intra vires, appeal allowed

Holding
- All matters relating to polluting the ocean are within the exclusive jurisdiction of the federal government owing to the national concern branch of the "peace, order, and good government" clause.

Court membership
- Chief Justice: Brian Dickson; Puisne Justices: Jean Beetz, Willard Estey, William McIntyre, Julien Chouinard, Antonio Lamer, Bertha Wilson, Gerald Le Dain, Gérard La Forest

Reasons given

R v Crown Zellerbach Canada Ltd [1988] 1 S.C.R. 401, is a leading constitutional decision of the Supreme Court of Canada. A deeply-divided Court upheld the validity of the Ocean Dumping Act, now part of the Canadian Environmental Protection Act, by finding that all matters related to polluting the ocean are within the exclusive jurisdiction of the federal government owing to the national concern branch of the "peace, order, and good government" clause in the British North America Act, 1867 (now known as the Constitution Act, 1867).

The majority opinion was written by Le Dain J (joined by Dickson CJ, and McIntyre and Wilson JJ) and hinged on the "singleness, distinctiveness, and indivisibility" of the national concern that the Ocean Dumping Act addressed. The minority opinion was written by La Forest J (joined by Beetz and Lamer JJ).

== See also ==
- List of Supreme Court of Canada cases (Dickson Court)
