= Wartime Labour Relations Regulations =

The Wartime Labour Relations Regulations, adopted under the War Measures Act on 17 February 1944, were introduced in Canada during World War II by the government of Prime Minister William Lyon Mackenzie King. Drafted loosely on the American Wagner Act, it was the first federal legislation in Canada to legally protect the formation of unions and to force employers to negotiate with organized workers. It was a foundational framework for legislation of union rights in Canada. The provisions of the order were later replicated by Acts of all the provincial legislatures.

== History ==
=== Context ===
There was labour unrest during the later years of the Second World War. The Canadian Congress of Labour was less politically active than its American counterpart, the American Federation of Labor. The American Wagner Act passed in 1935, brought in protections for labour bargaining and forcing employer negotiations with certified labour unions. Similar protections did not exist in Canada, and labour relations were governed through the Industrial Disputes Investigation Act, which had limited protections for strikes, only applied in certain workplaces, and did not cover labour disputes related to union formation.

At the onset of the war, the Canadian government amended the Criminal Code, adding Section 502A that made it a criminal offense for an employer to fire a lawful member of a trade union. However, without a good legislative definition of what a lawful union was, the offense was of limited effect. The onset of the war also saw an extension of the Industrial Disputes Investigation Act through regulation by extending it to activities with respect to "munitions of war and supplies" and "defence projects", effectively increasing its coverage from 15% of Canada's industry to approximately 85%.

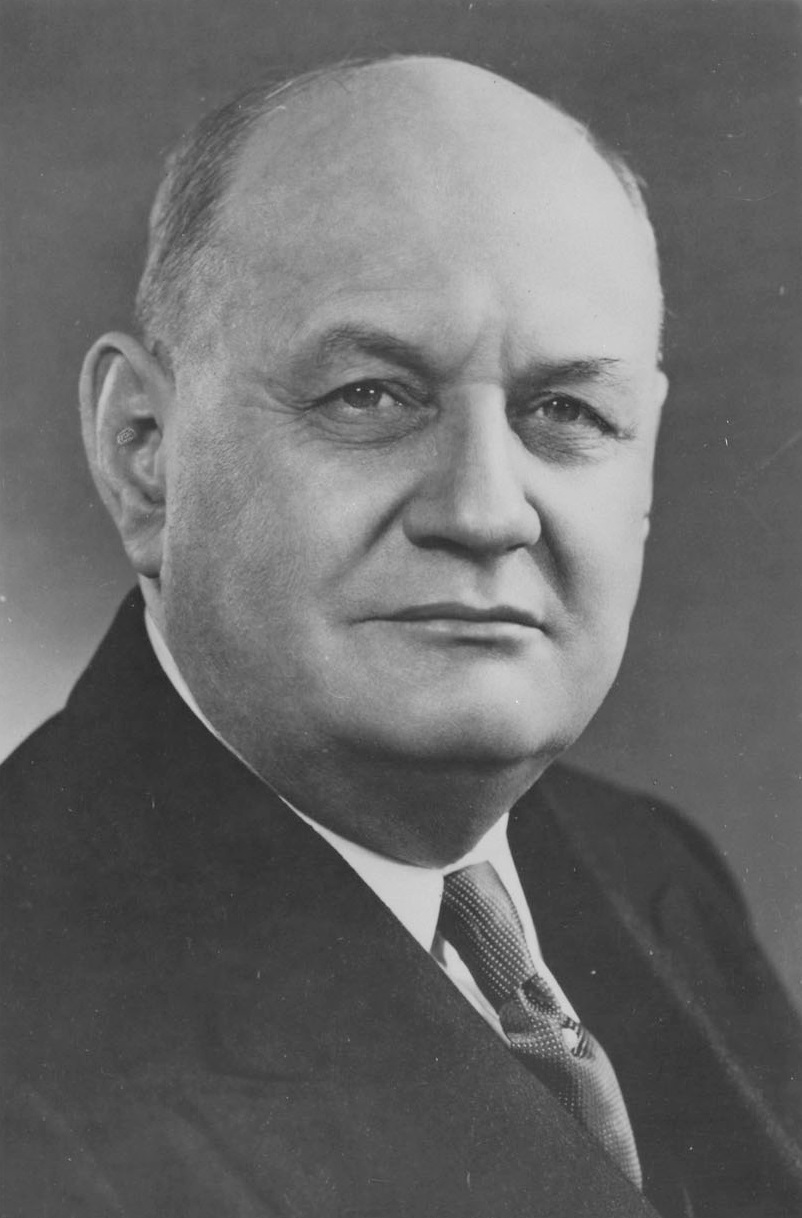
Humphrey Mitchell, trade unionist Liberal-Labour, and Minister of Labour during the creation of the order.

In 1940, labour leaders had begun to approach labour minister Norman McLarty. Organized labour's approach to wartime labour was one of conciliatory approaches to labour disputes in order to support the war effort, and the minister signaled that he did not wish to see this goodwill lead to exploitation of labour. As a result, 1940 saw the government make a declaration that employees should be free to join unions, which was welcomed by organized labour leaders, but some shortcomings in behaviour by the Canada Board of Munitions and Supply led to the Canadian Congress of Labour to call for a Wagner-style law to be passed. The government responded by strengthening regulations, but did not adopt legislation.

In 1941, the Board of Conciliation under the Industrial Disputes Investigation Act, found that National Steel Car refused to allow unionization votes, identifying the lack of punitive measures in current regulations. In 1941, a cabinet shuffle moved McLarty to Secretary of State and Registrar General, and bringing in Humphrey Mitchell as the new Minister of Labour.

The province of Ontario introduced a collective bargaining act in 1943, that won acclaim from both labour and employers with regards to its ability to prevent work stoppages.

In February 1943, an investigation by a newly formed National War Labour Board sought to inquire broadly into pay and labour issues. The Board ultimately endorsed the adoption of a national labour relations board, analogous to the American equivalent, with the power to sanction infractions of wartime labour violations. The report further called for the suspension of the Industrial Disputes Investigation Act for the duration of the war, and instead ban strikes and lockouts.

=== Development and Adoption ===
The report of the National War Labour Board was tabled in the House of Commons in January 1944. The Prime Minister affirmed the right of the federal government to govern industrial relations during wartime and stated that "the Code of labour Relations will be enacted in the near future."

The Regulations were adopted by Order-in-Council 1003 in early February 1944 as an emergency wartime measure. The order's preamble highlighted the interest of the country's defense in mutual negotiations between labour and business.

=== Provisions ===
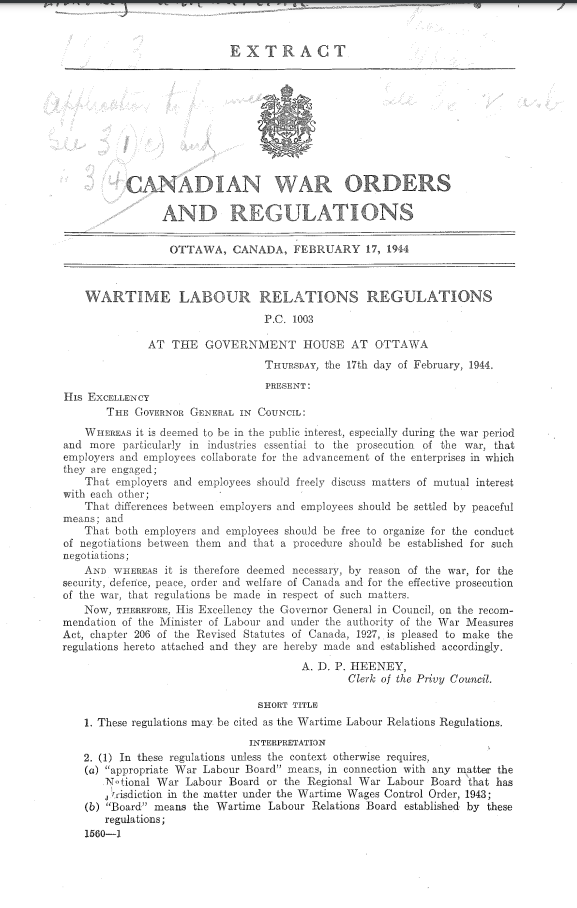
The first page of the Wartime Labour Relations Regulations P.C. 1003

The Regulations included some issues not covered by the Wagner Act, such as assigning government responsibility to aid negotiations. The order did not cover the issues of specific standards for the substance of labour agreements, instead focusing on the process by which bargaining is protected and agreements are ratified and enforced. The order did not cover foremen or "professional" employees.

The regulations required "good faith" bargaining, but did not enable compulsory arbitration.

Both positive and negative consequences resulted for workers and unions. A core mechanism of the order was to give an absolute right to all non-managerial workers in most sectors to be part of a trade union, protected workers from anti-union intimidation, protected the selection of union bargaining representatives, and establish a right to a bargaining process. The sectors covered by the order were attached as an appendix, and predominantly included primary industry and manufacturing. Bargaining was encouraged to be divided into multiple unions within a company, though it also permitted company-wide unions. The policy also functionally banned open company unionism. The regulations did not institute mandatory dues, which were later added in a 1946 arbitration award.

Collective agreements had to be for a minimum 1-year length, with a required 10-day notice before any lockout or strike. There were further limitations against striking without first undergoing a bargaining process, which restricted the rights of labour, while also protecting them from sudden lockouts without bargaining. The order similarly banned deliberate work slowdowns.

A new government agency, the Wartime Labour Relations Board (not to be confused with the National War Labour Board of 1943) was established to enforce the regulations. The Board was tasked with overseeing Boards of Conciliation struck by the minister between employers and labour unions, and was to oversee disputes, including giving the board the right of first instance/original jurisdiction, meaning disputes had to be seen before the board prior to litigation in the court. The order provided defined $500/day penalties for employers, $200/day for unions and $20/day penalties for employees who caused unauthorized strikes or lockouts.

=== Transition from wartime ===
The War Measures Act under which the Regulations were made was in force until 31 December 1945, following which the National Emergency Transitional Powers Act, 1945 continued specified regulations until 31 March 1947. The Continuation of Transitional Measures Act, 1947 extended the regulations until 30 April 1951.

Organized labour attempted to convert the Regulations into permanent legislation.

The reversion of industrial relations to provincial jurisdiction was characterized by multiple academics as having the wartime regulations form the basis for ensuing provincial legislation.

== Legacy ==
It was widely characterised as being the fundamental template for the Canadian labour legislative ecosystem. Union density increased dramatically following the end of World War II.

The order has been characterised as being insufficiently focused on uplifting labour rights of women and that the approach of the order focusing on individual workplaces eventually leading to the tendency of Canadian governments to be able to roll back public-sector labour protections. Further criticism has been levied on the understanding that with this heavily legally protected position, unions became extremely bureaucratic and less radical. This was reinforced by the fact that the order laid the groundwork for replication of the provisions that banned wildcat and sympathy strikes, meaning unionized workers had to follow an orderly fashion to engage in striking with no striking during periods of collective bargaining.
