= Johannesson v West St Paul (Rural Municipality of) =

Judgement of the Supreme Court of Canada

Johannesson v West St Paul (Rural Municipality of) [1952] 1 S.C.R. 297 is a leading Supreme Court of Canada decision on the federal jurisdiction over aeronautics. This was also the first Supreme Court case to analyze the peace, order, and good government provision of the Constitution and was the beginning of its modern interpretation.

== Background ==
Konnie Johannesson bought a plot of land near the Red River to build a landing strip. The neighbourhood brought an action against him to prevent him from building the strip on the basis that it violated a new specially-enacted municipal law that regulated the building of aerodromes.

== Decision ==
The majority held that aeronautics was a distinctive matter of national importance and so should reside within the exclusive jurisdiction of the federal government under the "peace, order, and good government" power.

In examining the test set out in Ontario v. Canada Temperance Federation, the Court found that the matter went "beyond local or provincial concern or interests and must from its inherent nature be the concern of the Dominion as a whole."

== Aftermath ==
In 1949, Johannesson built the landing strip and ran it until his death in 1968. It was then sold and eventually ended up as a housing development. No trace of the airstrip exists today.
