= Section 92(13) of the Constitution Act, 1867 =

Section 92(13) of the Constitution Act, 1867, also known as the property and civil rights power, grants the provincial legislatures of Canada the authority to legislate on:

13. Property and Civil Rights in the Province.

It is one of three key residuary powers in the Constitution Act, 1867, together with the federal power of peace, order and good government and the provincial power over matters of a local or private nature in the province.

== Extent ==
Provincial jurisdiction over property and civil rights embraces all private law transactions, which includes virtually all commercial transactions. Note that "civil rights" in this context does not refer to civil rights in the more modern sense of political liberties. Rather, it refers to private rights enforceable through civil courts. This power is generally balanced against the federal trade and commerce power and criminal law power. With respect to the former, In the Insurance Reference, Viscount Haldane noted that:

the authority to legislate for the regulation of trade and commerce does not extend to the regulation by a licensing system of a particular trade.

It is the most powerful and expansive of the provincial constitutional provisions, and is capable of being applied in general matters and in specific cases, as noted by the Judicial Committee of the Privy Council:

There appears to be no authority and no reason for the opinion that legislation in respect of property and civil rights must be general in character and not in respect of a particular right. Such a restriction would appear to eliminate the possibility of special legislation aimed at transferring a particular right or property from private hands to a public authority for public purposes. The Legislature is supreme in these matters, and its actions must be assumed to be taken with regard for justice and good conscience. They are not in any case subject to control by the courts.

The power has even been used to dissolve specific injunctions, such as one issued against the KVP Company in 1948 for discharging noxious effluent into the Spanish River.

Property and civil rights include:

- rights arising from contract
- certain powers to prevent crime
- powers to control transactions taking place wholly within the province, even if the products themselves are imported and, generally,
- regulation of trade and industry within the province, including

- labour relations and the regulation of professions,
- trading in securities, and
- manufacturing,

By themselves, incidental effects of provincial regulations on a federal sphere of influence do not change their true nature. Moreover, the fact that a valid provincial regulation may affect an export trade or the cost of doing business is similarly not conclusive of determining whether it is made "in relation to" that power.

If a provincial law affects rights of individuals outside the province:

- if it is, in pith and substance, provincial, ancillary effects on the rights of individuals outside the province are irrelevant, but
- where it is, in pith and substance, legislation in relation to the rights of individuals outside the province, it will be ultra vires the province
