= Canadian constitutional law =

Canadian constitutional law (French: droit constitutionnel du Canada) is the area of Canadian law relating to the interpretation and application of the Constitution of Canada by the courts. All laws of Canada, both provincial and federal, must conform to the Constitution and any laws inconsistent with the Constitution have no force or effect.

In Reference re Secession of Quebec, (Note: Reference re Secession of Quebec, 1998 CanLII 793, [1998] 2 SCR 217 (20 August 1998)) the Supreme Court characterized four fundamental and organizing principles of the Constitution (though not exhaustive): federalism; democracy; constitutionalism and the rule of law; and protection of minorities.

== Reviewable matters and legal standing ==
Under the authority of section 52(1) of the Constitution Act, 1982, courts may review all matters of law. Accordingly, the courts have a broad scope of competence. Constitutional issues come before the court through disputes between parties as well as through reference questions. The court has the discretion to hear any constitutional issues as long as there is a sufficient legal component. (Note: Re: Objection by Quebec to a Resolution to amend the Constitution, 1982 CanLII 219 at p. 805, [1982] 2 SCR 793 (6 December 1982)) The U.S. constitutional political questions doctrine was rejected and so a political dimension to the issue does not bar it from court. (Note: Operation Dismantle v. The Queen, 1985 CanLII 74, [1985] 1 SCR 441 (9 May 1985))

Courts must be careful when considering reference questions. They are required to be careful to only answer questions that are not speculative, of a purely political nature, or unripe. When answering the questions the court must retain its proper role within the constitutional framework. (Note: Reference Re Canada Assistance Plan (B.C.), 1991 CanLII 74, [1991] 2 SCR 525 (15 August 1991))

A party must have standing (locus standi) to bring a constitutional challenge to the courts. Those who wish to challenge a law can do so in one of several ways. A party who is directly affected by the law that purports to be unconstitutional has standing as of right. Likewise, rights holder may challenge any law that will limit any of their rights. Those who are not protected by a right but are nonetheless prosecuted by that law may challenge it as well. (Note: R. v. Big M Drug Mart Ltd., 1985 CanLII 69, [1985] 1 SCR 295 (24 April 1985), Supreme Court (Canada))

Public interest groups may also gain standing if they satisfy the requirements of the Borowski test. (Note: Minister of Justice (Can.) v. Borowski, 1981 CanLII 34, [1981] 2 SCR 575 (1 December 1981), subsequently clarified in Canadian Council of Churches v. Canada (Minister of Employment and Immigration), 1992 CanLII 116, [1992] 1 SCR 236 (23 January 1992)) The group must demonstrate that the law raises a serious constitutional issue, the group has a genuine interest in the matter, and that there is no other reasonable and effective manner in which the issue may be brought before the Court.

== Unwritten aspects of constitutional law ==
In rare cases, the courts have developed substantive rules of constitutional law that are not expressly set out in constitutional texts but rather implied by a number of different principles.

In Hunt v T&N plc, (Note: Hunt v. T&N plc, 1999 CanLII 43, [1993] 4 SCR 289 (18 November 1993)) the Supreme Court of Canada found that "the integrating character of our constitutional arrangements as they apply to interprovincial mobility" called for the courts of each province to give "full faith and credit" to the judgments of courts of other provinces – even though Canada's constitution does not have an express Full Faith and Credit Clause. This development was criticized by at least one academic.

In the Provincial Judges Reference, (Note: Ref re Remuneration of Judges of the Prov. Court of P.E.I.; Ref re Independence and Impartiality of Judges of the Prov. Court of P.E.I., 1997 CanLII 317, [1997] 3 SCR 3 (18 September 1997)) the Supreme Court found that there was an unwritten constitutional principle that protected a right to judicial salary commissions for provincial court judges.

== Concepts in interpretation ==
=== A "living tree" ===
Since the 1929 ruling in Edwards v Canada (AG), the courts have interpreted the Constitution within the context of society to ensure that it adapts and reflects changes. As Viscount Sankey stated, "The British North America Act planted in Canada a living tree capable of growth and expansion within its natural limits." (Note: Henrietta Muir Edwards and others v The Attorney General of Canada [1929] UKPC 86, [1930] A.C. 124 (18 October 1929), P.C. (on appeal from Canada))

=== Purposive ===
The Canadian courts have adopted a liberal approach to the approach of statutory and constitutional interpretation, best expressed in the statement, "Today there is only one principle or approach, namely, the words of an Act are to be read in their entire context and in their grammatical and ordinary sense harmoniously with the scheme of the Act, the object of the Act, and the intention of Parliament."

=== Dialogue ===
In Charter jurisprudence, the "dialogue principle" is where judicial review of legislation is said to be part of a "dialogue" between the legislatures and the courts. It specifically involves governments drafting legislation in response to court rulings and courts acknowledging the effort if the new legislation is challenged.

== Charter compliance ==
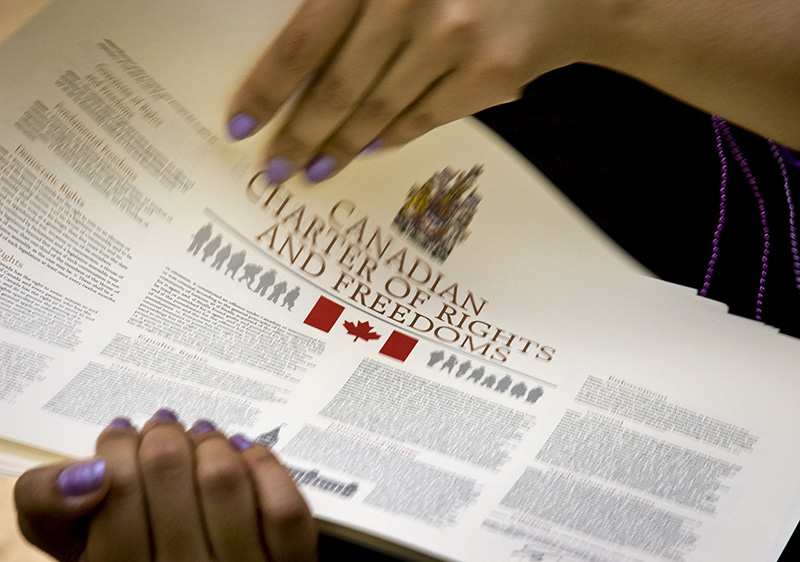
Canadian Charter of Rights and Freedoms

In 1982 the Canadian Charter of Rights and Freedoms was brought into effect. This was not meant to affect the workings of federalism, though some content was moved from section 91 to section 4 of the Charter. Mainly, the Charter is meant to decrease powers of both levels of government by ensuring both federal and provincial laws respect Charter rights, under section 32.

The relationship between federalism and the Charter is directly dealt with in section 31, which declares that neither the federal nor provincial governments gain powers under the Charter.

In R v Big M Drug Mart Ltd, it was found that legislation whose purpose is found to violate the Charter cannot be saved even if its effects were found to be inoffensive. If a provision of law cannot be seen to constitute a reasonable limit, demonstrably justifiable in a free and democratic society, it cannot be saved pursuant to section 1 of the Charter. The determination of s. 1 validity follows the Oakes test first expressed in R v Oakes, which follows four parts, of which the last three have been named as the "proportionality test": (Note: R. v. Oakes, 1986 CanLII 46 at par. 68–71, [1986] 1 SCR 103 (28 February 1986))

1. the reason for the rights violation must be "pressing and substantial"
2. there must be a "rational connection" between the rights-infringing measure and the objective
3. the measure must be the least restrictive means for realizing the objective
4. the deleterious effects of the measure must be proportionate to the importance of the objective

Although modified in subsequent jurisprudence to relax its strictness, (Note: R. v. Edwards Books and Art Ltd., 1986 CanLII 12, [1986] 2 SCR 713 (18 December 1986)) (Note: Irwin Toy Ltd. v. Quebec (Attorney General), 1989 CanLII 87, [1989] 1 SCR 927 (27 April 1989)) Oakes continues to be of valid application.

However, the provincial education power under Section 93 of the Constitution Act, 1867 is plenary, and is not subject to Charter attack, so long as it does not extend beyond the confines of Section 93's mandate to fund Roman Catholic separate schools and public schools. (Note: Adler v. Ontario, 1996 CanLII 148, 30 OR (3d) 642; 140 DLR (4th) 385 (21 November 1996), Supreme Court (Canada))

== Legislative competence ==
In order to rationalize how far each jurisdiction may use its authority, certain doctrines have been devised by the courts:

- pith and substance, including the nature of any ancillary powers and the colourability of legislation,
- double aspect,
- paramountcy,
- Crown immunity, and
- interjurisdictional immunity

There are also differences in legislative competence in each of the Provinces, as each had entered Confederation on somewhat different terms. As Viscount Simon of the Privy Council noted in 1953:

Every province created or to be created must, of course, be a province in the Dominion of Canada, but the Act of 1867 contained no such definition of province as would involve any conflict between that Act and the 1871 Act. There is no complete equality of powers between the four original provinces.

=== Pith and substance ===
The pith and substance doctrine is founded on the recognition that it is in practice impossible for a legislature to exercise its jurisdiction over a matter effectively without incidentally affecting matters within the jurisdiction of another level of government.

Also, some matters are by their very nature impossible to categorize under a single head of power: they may have both provincial and federal aspects. The double aspect doctrine, which applies in the course of a pith and substance analysis, ensures that the policies of the elected legislators of both levels of government are respected, by recognizing that both Parliament and the provincial legislatures can adopt valid legislation on a single subject depending on the perspective from which the legislation is considered (i.e., depending on the various aspects of the matter in question).

In certain circumstances, however, the powers of one level of government must be protected against intrusions, even incidental ones, by the other level. For this purpose, the courts have developed the doctrines of interjurisdictional immunity and federal paramountcy.

The Parliament of Canada has power to bind Her Majesty both in right of Canada and of any province, but provincial statutes do not of their own force bind the federal Crown. (Note: Gauthier v. The King, 1918 CanLII 85 at p. 194, 56 SCR 176 (5 March 1918)) There is considerable debate as to whether interprovincial sovereign immunity exists.

In Re Upper Churchill Water Rights Reversion Act, an Act of the Newfoundland legislature was held to be unconstitutional because of colourability. While its stated purpose was to cancel a long-term lease and to expropriate power generation assets located in the province, its real purpose was to interfere with civil rights existing outside the province. As noted by Mr Justice McIntyre:

Where the pith and substance of the provincial enactment is in relation to matters which fall within the field of provincial legislative competence, incidental or consequential effects on extraprovincial rights will not render the enactment ultra vires. Where, however, the pith and substance of the provincial enactment is the derogation from or elimination of extraprovincial rights then, even if it is cloaked in the proper constitutional form, it will be ultra vires. A colourable attempt to preserve the appearance of constitutionality in order to conceal an unconstitutional objective will not save the legislation. (Note: Re Upper Churchill Water Rights Reversion Act, at p. 332)

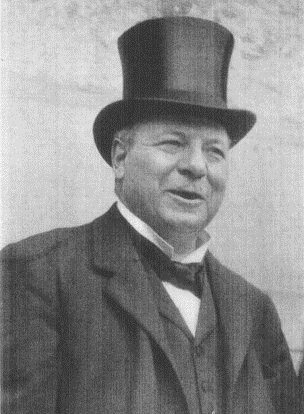
Lord Haldane

Certain measures that would be constitutionally valid if enacted on their own are invalid if they are combined with other measures that invade unconstitutionally into the other jurisdiction. This is held to be overreach. As noted by Viscount Haldane:

Within the spheres allotted to them by the (B.N.A.) Act the Dominion and the Provinces are rendered on general principle co-ordinate governments. As a consequence where one has legislative power the other has not, speaking broadly, the capacity to pass laws which will interfere with its exercise. What cannot be done directly cannot be done indirectly. (Note: The Great West Saddlery Company Limited and others v The King [1921] UKPC 27, [1921] AC 91 (25 February 1921), Privy Council (on appeal from Canada), at p. 100)

- In Reference re Assisted Human Reproduction Act, (Note: Reference re Assisted Human Reproduction Act, 2010 SCC 61, [2010] 3 SCR 457 (22 December 2010)) the federal use of the criminal law power was found in certain key aspects to overreach too far into the provincial hospitals power, as well as into the more familiar sphere of property and civil rights.
- In Reference re Securities Act, (Note: Reference re Securities Act, 2011 SCC 66, [2011] 3 SCR 837 (22 December 2011)) a proposed federal law for establishing a national securities regulator was held to overreach, as a whole, too far into the property and civil rights power, and was thus wholly unconstitutional.

=== "Double aspect" under Multiple Access ===
Multiple Access Ltd v McCutcheon (Note: Multiple Access Ltd. v. McCutcheon, 1982 CanLII 1705, [1982] 2 SCR 161 (9 August 1982)) held that, even when federal and provincial laws have been enacted on the same matter by virtue of the double aspect doctrine, the doctrine of paramountcy does not necessarily have to be invoked. In that regard, Mr Justice Dickson observed:

The conflict ... lies in large measures upon the opinion ... that the paramountcy doctrine became applicable because a plaintiff could resort to one set of provisions only and, having done so, there would be no scope for the other to have operational effect. That is unquestionably an important consideration but it is not, in my view, conclusive. The provincial legislation merely duplicates the federal; it does not contradict it. The fact that a plaintiff may have a choice of remedies does not mean that the provisions of both levels of government cannot "live together" and operate concurrently.

Therefore, paramountcy should only be invoked where there is a conflict between the federal and provincial laws in question. There is no danger of double recovery being possible where the laws are not in conflict, as no court would permit it.

=== Canadian Western Bank principles ===
The current approach to determining the constitutionality of legislation is founded in Canadian Western Bank v Alberta, (Note: Canadian Western Bank v. Alberta, 2007 SCC 22, [2007] 2 SCR 3 (31 May 2007)) where the Supreme Court of Canada summarized the following principles:

- the pith and substance of the provincial law and the federal law should be examined to ensure that they are both validly enacted laws and to determine the nature of the overlap, if any, between them.
- the applicability of the provincial law to the federal undertaking or matter in question must be resolved with reference to the doctrine of interjurisdictional immunity.
- only if both the provincial law and the federal law have been found to be valid pieces of legislation, and only if the provincial law is found to be applicable to the federal matter in question, then both statutes must be compared to determine whether the overlap between them constitutes a conflict sufficient to trigger the application of the doctrine of federal paramountcy.

The burden of proof falls on the party that is alleging paramountcy. As Mr Justice Binnie and Mr Justice LeBel noted:

To sum up, the onus is on the party relying on the doctrine of federal paramountcy to demonstrate that the federal and provincial laws are in fact incompatible by establishing either

- that it is impossible to comply with both laws or
- that to apply the provincial law would frustrate the purpose of the federal law.

Where the constitutionality of legislation is being questioned in relation to the division of powers under the Constitution Act, 1867, an analysis of its pith and substance must be undertaken. This analysis consists of an inquiry into the true nature of the law in question for the purpose of identifying the matter to which it essentially relates.

- If its pith and substance can be related to a matter that falls within the jurisdiction of the legislature that enacted it, the courts will declare it intra vires.
- If, however, it can more properly be said to relate to a matter that is outside the jurisdiction of that legislature, it will be held to be invalid owing to this violation of the division of powers.
- The corollary to this analysis is that legislation whose pith and substance falls within the jurisdiction of the legislature that enacted it may, at least to a certain extent, affect matters beyond the legislature’s jurisdiction without necessarily being unconstitutional. At this stage of the analysis, the dominant purpose of the legislation is still decisive.
- Merely incidental effects will not disturb the constitutionality of an otherwise intra vires law.

=== Ancillary powers under Lacombe ===
In Quebec (AG) v Lacombe, the nature of any ancillary powers arising from the pith and substance of a matter was considered. As noted by Chief Justice McLachlin, the Chief Justice: (Note: Quebec (Attorney General) v. Lacombe, 2010 SCC 38 at par. 41–48, [2010] 2 SCR 453 (15 October 2010))

- The degree of integration required increases in proportion to the seriousness of the encroachment.
- Where the impugned measure encroaches only slightly on the jurisdiction of the other level of government, a rational, functional connection is required.
- As the degree of intrusion grows more serious, the required degree of integration tends toward a test of necessity.
- To meet the test, a prima facie invalid measure must complement rather than merely supplement the legislative scheme. It must, both rationally and in its function, further the purposes of the valid legislative scheme of which it is said to be part.

=== Interjurisdictional immunity under COPA and PHS Community Services ===
In Quebec (AG) v Canadian Owners and Pilots Assn ("COPA"), Chief Justice McLachlin outlined a two-step test that must be undertaken to determine if interjurisdictional immunity comes into play: (Note: Quebec (Attorney General) v. Canadian Owners and Pilots Association, 2010 SCC 39 at par. 27, [2010] 2 SCR 536 (15 October 2010))

1. Does the provincial law trench on the protected "core" of a federal competence?
2. Is the provincial law's effect on the exercise of the protected federal power sufficiently serious to invoke the doctrine of interjurisdictional immunity?

Though there remains some debate, it has generally been accepted that interjurisdictional immunity applies equally to both the federal and provincial governments. Nevertheless, virtually all of the case law concerns situations where provincial laws encroach on federal matters. In Canada (AG) v PHS Community Services Society, the Supreme Court expressed caution in employing the doctrine in future cases because: (Note: Canada (Attorney General) v. PHS Community Services Society, 2011 SCC 44 at par. 62–64, [2011] 3 SCR 134 (30 September 2011))

1. It is in tension with the dominant approach that permits concurrent federal and provincial legislation with respect to a matter.
2. It is in tension with the emergent practice of cooperative federalism.
3. It may overshoot the federal or provincial power in which it is grounded and create legislative "no go" zones where neither level of government regulates.

As Chief Justice McLachlin explained in that decision:

[70] In summary, the doctrine of interjurisdictional immunity is narrow. Its premise of fixed watertight cores is in tension with the evolution of Canadian constitutional interpretation towards the more flexible concepts of double aspect and cooperative federalism. To apply it here would disturb settled competencies and introduce uncertainties for new ones. Quite simply, the doctrine is neither necessary nor helpful in the resolution of the contest here between the federal government and the provincial government.
