= Marine Services International Ltd v Ryan Estate =

- Supreme Court of Canada

Hearing: 15 January 2013 Judgment: 2 August 2013
- Full case name: Marine Services International Limited and David Porter v Estate of Joseph Ryan, by its Administratrix, Yvonne Ryan, Yvonne Ryan, in her own right, Stephen Ryan, a Minor, by his Guardian ad litem, Yvonne Ryan, Jennifer Ryan, a Minor, by her Guardian ad litem, Yvonne Ryan, Estate of David Ryan, by its Administratrix, Marilyn Ryan, Marilyn Ryan, in her own right, David Michael Ryan, a Minor, by his Guardian ad litem, Marilyn Ryan, J and Y Fisheries Inc. and D and M Fisheries Inc., bodies corporate, trading and operating as Ryan's Fisheries Partnership, Universal Marine Limited and Attorney General of Canada
- Citations: 2013 SCC 44
- Docket No.: 34429
- Prior history: APPEAL from Newfoundland (Workplace Health, Safety and Compensation Commission) v. Ryan Estate, 2011 NLCA 42 (15 June 2011), affirming Ryan Estate v. Universal Marine, 2009 NLTD 120 (28 July 2009).
- Ruling: Appeal allowed.

Holding
- Interjurisdictional immunity and federal paramountcy do not apply, as the federal and provincial Acts can operate side by side without conflict.

Court membership
- Chief Justice: Beverley McLachlin; Puisne Justices: Louis LeBel, Marie Deschamps, Morris Fish, Rosalie Abella, Marshall Rothstein, Thomas Cromwell, Michael Moldaver, Andromache Karakatsanis, Richard Wagner

Reasons given
- Unanimous reasons by: LeBel and Karakatsanis JJ

Marine Services International Ltd v Ryan Estate, 2013 SCC 44 is a leading case of the Supreme Court of Canada concerning the coexistence of Canadian maritime law with provincial jurisdiction over property and civil rights, and it marks a further restriction upon the doctrine of interjurisdictional immunity in Canadian constitutional jurisprudence.

== Background ==
The sea took the lives of two fishermen off the coast of Newfoundland and Labrador.

--SCC, par. 1

In September 2004, the Newfoundland fishing vessel Ryan's Commander departed Bay de Verde for a trip to its home port of St. Brendan's, but it never arrived. In heavy seas off Cape Bonavista the vessel capsized, forcing the crew of five to abandon ship. Despite the efforts of search and rescue technicians, brothers Joe and David Ryan did not survive. Their widows and dependants (the "Ryan Estates") applied for and received compensation under the provincial Workplace Health, Safety and Compensation Act.

Proceeding under the federal Marine Liability Act, the Ryan Estates also commenced an action in 2006 against Universal Marine Limited, Marine Services International Limited and its employee David Porter, alleging negligence in the design and construction of the Ryan's Commander, which had been commissioned by the Ryan brothers in 2003. The action was also brought against the Attorney General of Canada, alleging negligence in the inspection of the vessel by Transport Canada.

Marine Services and Porter applied to the Workplace Health, Safety and Compensation Commission for a determination of whether the Ryan Estates' action was statute-barred under s. 44 of the provincial Act. The Commission declared that it was, holding:

- the Ryan brothers had died in the course of their employment,
- Universal Marine, Marine Services, and the Attorney General of Canada were "employers" and David Porter was a "worker" within the meaning of s. 2 of the Act, and
- the constitutional doctrines of interjurisdictional immunity and federal paramountcy did not apply.

The Ryan Estates applied to the Trial Division of the Supreme Court of Newfoundland and Labrador for judicial review of the decision in the nature of certiorari to quash the decision

== The courts below ==
At trial, Hall J overturned the commission's decision, ruling:

- the provincial Act was, in pith and substance, an insurance scheme, while liability in the marine context fell within the exclusive federal jurisdiction over Navigation and Shipping, and the right to make a claim under the federal Act was a core feature of that power.
- interjurisdictional immunity applied, as the statute bar under the provincial Act impaired the ability to pursue a claim under the federal Act.
- federal paramountcy applied because the Ryan Estates could not comply with both Acts.

The Court of Appeal, in a 2-1 ruling, dismissed the appeal. The majority held that:

- the provincial Act was a valid exercise of the provincial power over property and civil rights, but interjurisdictional immunity applied because s. 44 trenches on maritime negligence law, which sits at the core of the federal power over navigation and shipping.
- federal paramountcy applied, and even if dual compliance was possible, the operation of s. 44 frustrated the purpose of the federal Act by denying access to the federal maritime tort regime to the dependants of persons who die in maritime incidents.

In dissent, Welsh JA stated that neither doctrine applied, as the provincial Act did not trench on the core of the federal power over navigation and shipping (being a workers' compensation scheme which does not engage issues of negligence), and the fact that s. 44 restricts the scope of the right granted under s. 6(2) of the MLA was not sufficient to establish the frustration of a federal purpose.

Leave to appeal was sought from the Supreme Court of Canada, which was granted in April 2012.

== At the Supreme Court ==
In a unanimous decision, the Court of Appeal's decision was overturned. In their joint ruling, LeBel and Karakatsanis JJ focused on two key issues:

1. Does s. 44 of the provincial Act apply on the facts of this case?
2. If it applies, is it constitutionally applicable and operative?

=== Application of s. 44 ===
The parties did not dispute the commission's findings that under the provincial Act: (a) the Ryan brothers were injured in the course of employment; (b) Marine Services was an "employer"; and (c) Porter was a "worker". The dispute was whether the injury that led to the Ryan brothers' death "occurred otherwise than in the conduct of the operations usual in or incidental to the industry carried on by the employer" as stated in s. 44(2).

The commission had exclusive jurisdiction under s. 19 to determine matters under the Act, and the standard of reasonableness under Dunsmuir v. New Brunswick holds that the commission's findings were entitled to deference.

=== Constitutional questions ===
Under Canadian Western Bank v. Alberta, an analysis is required to assess whether interjurisdictional immunity or federal paramountcy apply:

1. An analysis of the pith and substance must be undertaken, which consists of "an inquiry into the true nature of the law in question for the purpose of identifying the 'matter' to which it essentially relates". Two aspects of the law or of the impugned provision are analyzed: the purpose of the enacting body in adopting it, and the legal effect of the law or provision. In this case, the validity of the two Acts was not contested and a full pith and substance analysis was not required.
2. At the end of a pith and substance analysis, a court should generally consider interjurisdictional immunity only if there is "prior case law favouring its application to the subject matter at hand". The doctrine "is of limited application and should in general be reserved for situations already covered by precedent". In view of Ordon v. Grail, the SCC had to consider whether interjurisdictional immunity applied.
3. In COPA, a two-pronged test was devised to determine whether the doctrine of interjurisdictional immunity applied: (1) whether the provincial law trenches on the protected "core" of a federal competence, (2) if it does, whether the provincial law's effect on the exercise of the protected federal power is sufficiently serious to invoke the doctrine. The standard to be used is that of impairment, and "impairment" is a higher standard than "affects", as in "an era of cooperative, flexible federalism, application of the doctrine of interjurisdictional immunity requires a significant or serious intrusion on the exercise" of a head of power.
4. The first prong of the test was met, but not the second. While federal jurisdiction over navigation and shipping "encompasses those aspects of navigation and shipping that engage national concerns which must be uniformly regulated across the country, regardless of their territorial scope", it has been acknowledged since 1919 that workers' compensation schemes apply to the maritime context.
5. While Ordon held that interjurisdictional immunity applies where a provincial statute of general application has the effect of indirectly regulating a maritime negligence law issue, it predates Canadian Western Bank and COPA, which clarified the two-step test for interjurisdictional immunity and set the necessary level of intrusion into the relevant core at "impairs" instead of "affects". Accordingly, Ordon does not apply the two-step test for interjurisdictional immunity developed in Western Bank and COPA nor the notion of impairment of the federal core which is now necessary to trigger the application of interjurisdictional immunity.
6. "The doctrine of paramountcy applies where there is a federal law and a provincial law which are (1) each valid and (2) inconsistent." The doctrine does not apply to an inconsistency between the common law and a valid legislative enactment. Upon a proper reading of the federal Act, the doctrine did not apply.

The Court declared:

[76] In our view, the WHSCA and the MLA can operate side by side without conflict. Indeed, s. 6(2) of the MLA provides that a dependant may bring a claim "under circumstances that would have entitled the person, if not deceased, to recover damages". We agree with Welsh JA at the Court of Appeal that this language suggests that there are situations where a dependant is not allowed to bring an action pursuant to s. 6(2) of the MLA. Such a situation occurs where a statutory provision — such as s. 44 of the WHSCA — prohibits litigation because compensation has already been awarded under a workers' compensation scheme.

== Impact ==
Interjurisdictional immunity and federal paramountcy do not apply in this case.

--SCC, par. 85

The case has attracted extensive comment in the Canadian legal profession:

1. While Beetz J had suggested in obiter in Bisaillon v. Keable that the paramountcy doctrine could apply to conflicts between federal common law and provincial statute law, the Court in Ryan Estate noted that "we are aware of no case in which the doctrine was applied to common law". However, the Court did not directly deal with whether paramountcy can apply where a federal statute is inconsistent with a provincial rule of common law. Such conflicts have given rise to a significant body of case law in the United States, where courts have frequently held that state tort laws may be "pre-empted" where they conflict with federal enactments.
2. While the decision may be surprising to those who practise in the area of maritime law (with some considering the lower courts to have reached the correct decision), to conclude differently would have created uncertainty, (a) for marine employers who may have paid into their respective provincial funds but, ultimately, would not be entitled to the limited liability benefits thereof; and (b) for employees injured or killed in a marine context who would not, based on their specific fact scenario, have a claim in tort against their employer and thus would have no ability to obtain compensation.
3. In Ryan Estate, the SCC also tried to clarify what exactly it means to impair a core legislative power. The SCC considered (1) extent of federal power (in this case over navigation and shipping), (2) the lack of uniformity in Canadian maritime law, and (3) the history of other workers' compensation schemes in a maritime context. The SCC's considerations, however, may cause future confusion. It is difficult to quantify, for example, the "breadth of federal power" in a legislative area and how that relates to the potential impairment.
