= Canadian maritime law =

Canadian maritime law is based on the field of "Navigation and Shipping" vested in the Parliament of Canada by virtue of s. 91(10) of the Constitution Act, 1867.

== Scope of jurisdiction ==
Canada has adopted an expansive definition of its maritime law, which goes beyond traditional admiralty law. The original English admiralty jurisdiction was called "wet", as it concerned itself with things done at sea, including collisions, salvage and the work of mariners, and contracts and torts performed at sea. Canadian law has added "dry" jurisdiction to this field, which includes such matters as:

- stevedoring,
- marine insurance,
- warehousing and security services,
- contracts of agency, and
- contracts of carriage.

This list is not exhaustive of the subject matter.

== History ==
Canadian jurisdiction was originally consolidated in 1891, with subsequent expansions in 1934 following the passage of the Statute of Westminster 1931, and in 1971 with the extension to "dry" matters.

The scope of Canada's jurisdiction was crystallized in 1971 in legislation creating the Federal Court of Canada:

2. ..."Canadian maritime law" means the law that was administered by the Exchequer Court of Canada on its Admiralty side by virtue of the Admiralty Act, chapter A-1 of the Revised Statutes of Canada, 1970, or any other statute, or that would have been so administered if that Court had had, on its Admiralty side, unlimited jurisdiction in relation to maritime and admiralty matters, as that law has been altered by this Act or any other Act of Parliament;...

...

42. Canadian maritime law as it was immediately before June 1, 1971 continues subject to such changes therein as may be made by this Act or any other Act of Parliament.

== Canadian jurisprudence ==
This has been held by the Supreme Court of Canada, most recently in Ordon Estate v. Grail, to cover a very broad field:

71...These cases establish a number of basic principles and themes regarding the sources and content of Canadian maritime law, the role of provincial law in relation thereto, and the scope for gradual change and development in maritime law. These general principles and themes, insofar as they are relevant to the instant appeals, may be summarized as follows:

1. "Canadian maritime law" as defined in s. 2 of the Federal Court Act is a comprehensive body of federal law dealing with all claims in respect of maritime and admiralty matters. The scope of Canadian maritime law is not limited by the scope of English admiralty law at the time of its adoption into Canadian law in 1934. Rather, the word "maritime" is to be interpreted within the modern context of commerce and shipping, and the ambit of Canadian maritime law should be considered limited only by the constitutional division of powers in the Constitution Act, 1867. The test for determining whether a subject matter under consideration is within maritime law requires a finding that the subject matter is so integrally connected to maritime matters as to be legitimate Canadian maritime law within federal competence...
2. Canadian maritime law is uniform throughout Canada, and it is not the law of any province of Canada. All of its principles constitute federal law and not an incidental application of provincial law...
3. The substantive content of Canadian maritime law is to be determined by reference to its heritage. It includes, but is not limited to, the body of law administered in England by the High Court on its Admiralty side in 1934, as that body of law has been amended by the Canadian Parliament and as it has developed by judicial precedent to date...
4. English admiralty law as incorporated into Canadian law in 1934 was an amalgam of principles deriving in large part from both the common law and the civilian tradition. It was composed of both the specialized rules and principles of admiralty, and the rules and principles adopted from the common law and applied in admiralty cases. Although most of Canadian maritime law with respect to issues of tort, contract, agency and bailment is founded upon the English common law, there are issues specific to maritime law where reference may fruitfully be made to the experience of other countries and specifically, because of the genesis of admiralty jurisdiction, to civilian experience...
5. The nature of navigation and shipping activities as they are practised in Canada makes a uniform maritime law a practical necessity. Much of maritime law is the product of international conventions, and the legal rights and obligations of those engaged in navigation and shipping should not arbitrarily change according to jurisdiction. The need for legal uniformity is particularly pressing in the area of tortious liability for collisions and other accidents that occur in the course of navigation...
6. In those instances where Parliament has not passed legislation dealing with a maritime matter, the inherited non-statutory principles embodied in Canadian maritime law as developed by Canadian courts remain applicable, and resort should be had to these principles before considering whether to apply provincial law to resolve an issue in a maritime action...
7. Canadian maritime law is not static or frozen. The general principles established by this Court with respect to judicial reform of the law apply to the reform of Canadian maritime law, allowing development in the law where the appropriate criteria are met...

This has had the effect of displacing many provincial statutes that were previously being used in maritime liability cases, and the implications are still being worked out.

In the 2006 case of Isen v Simms, the Court endorsed a summary given by Décary JA on what does not fall within federal jurisdiction:

The accident occurred on land. The injury was caused on land by a person who was neither on the boat nor in the water. There is no contract for carriage of goods by sea. There are no goods at issue. Nothing has happened on water which could be said to be directly or even indirectly related to the accident. There is no issue as to the seaworthiness of the ship, the issue at best being one as to the roadworthiness of a boat being prepared on land for road transportation. There are no in rem proceedings. There are no concerns of good seamanship. There are no specialized admiralty laws, rules, principles or practices applicable. The accident has nothing to do with navigation nor with shipping. There is no practical necessity for a uniform federal law prescribing how to secure the engine cover from flapping in the wind when a pleasure craft is transported on land in a boat trailer. The sole factor possibly connected to maritime law is that the pleasure craft had just come out of the water and was still being secured on the trailer when the accident happened. This, clearly, is not enough to constitute an integral connection with navigation and shipping and an encroachment of civil rights and property.

The scope of maritime law has been refined by the SCC in subsequent jurisprudence:

- In 2012, in Tessier Ltée v. Quebec, it was declared that federal jurisdiction over shipping is not absolute, and must be construed in conjunction with the power to regulate works and undertakings, where the provinces are entitled to regulate transportation within their boundaries, while the federal government has jurisdiction over transportation that transcends provincial boundaries and connects the provinces with each other or with other countries.
- In 2013, in Marine Services International Ltd. v. Ryan Estate, Ordon's effect was restricted insofar as provincial jurisdiction may be affected by paramountcy and interjurisdictional immunity, as it was decided prior to the SCC's subsequent decisions on those fields in Canadian Western Bank and COPA.

== Relevant statutes ==
- Canada Marine Act (S.C. 1998, c. 10)
- Canada Shipping Act, 2001 (S.C. 2001, c. 26)
- Marine Insurance Act (S.C. 1993, c. 22)
- Marine Liability Act (S.C. 2001, c. 6)
- Pilotage Act (R.S.C., 1985, c. P-14)
