= Labour Conventions Reference =

- Court: Judicial Committee of the Privy Council
- Full case name: The Attorney General of Canada v The Attorney General of Ontario and others
- Decided: 28 January 1937
- Citations: [1937] UKPC 6 (BAILII), [1937] AC 326, 156 LT 302, [1937] 1 DLR 673, [1937] 1 WWR 299

Case history
- Prior actions: Reference re legislative jurisdiction of Parliament of Canada to enact the Minimum Wages Act (1935, c. 44), 1936 CanLII 24, [1936] SCR 461 (17 June 1936)
- Appealed from: Supreme Court of Canada

Court membership
- Judges sitting: Lord Atkin; Lord Thankerton; Lord Macmillan; Lord Wright; Sir Sidney Rowlatt

Case opinions
- Decision by: Lord Atkin

Keywords
- Labour relations; Foreign relations; Canadian federalism

Canada (AG) v Ontario (AG) [1937] UKPC 6, [1937] A.C. 326, also known as the Labour Conventions Reference, is a landmark decision of the Judicial Committee of the Privy Council concerning the distinct nature of federal and provincial jurisdiction in Canadian federalism.

== Background ==
=== The federal treaty power ===
As part of the British North America Act, 1867, the Parliament of Canada was granted power to implement certain treaties:

132. The Parliament and Government of Canada shall have all Powers necessary or proper for performing the Obligations of Canada or of any Province thereof, as Part of the British Empire, towards Foreign Countries, arising under Treaties between the Empire and such Foreign Countries.

During the 1920s, as a result of the growing political and diplomatic independence of the various Dominions of the Empire, the Balfour Declaration of 1926 stated that the United Kingdom and the Dominions were:

autonomous Communities within the British Empire, equal in status, in no way subordinate one to another in any aspect of their domestic or external affairs, though united by a common allegiance to the Crown, and freely associated as members of the British Commonwealth of Nations.

When Canada subsequently gained full independence following passage of the Statute of Westminster 1931, s. 132 was not amended to reflect its changed status.

=== The Labour Conventions ===
As a consequence of the Treaty of Versailles, the International Labour Organization was established, in which Canada became a member. Between 1919 and 1928, the ILO adopted several conventions, including:

- the Hours of Work (Industry) Convention, 1919,
- the Weekly Rest (Industry) Convention, 1921, and
- the Minimum Wage-Fixing Machinery Convention, 1928.

Their ratification and implementation were not carried out, following a 1925 reference to the Supreme Court of Canada which declared that only the provincial legislatures had the competence to do so with the first two conventions, except with respect to federal civil servants and workers in those parts of Canada not within the limits of a province. The decision in that ruling was unanimous.

In 1935, the Parliament of Canada ratified the conventions, and subsequently passed:

- The Weekly Rest In Industrial Undertakings Act,
- The Minimum Wages Act, and
- The Limitation of Hours of Work Act.

This change in position followed the Privy Council's decision in the Aeronautics Reference, which declared:

There may also be cases where the Dominion is entitled to speak for the whole, and this not because of any judicial interpretation of ss. 91 and 92, but by reason of the plain terms of s. 132, where Canada as a whole, having undertaken an obligation, is given the power necessary and proper for performing such an obligation.

As there was debate as to whether the Parliament had the competence to pass these Acts, reference questions were given to the Supreme Court as to in what particular or to what extent each of them was ultra vires.

== Reference to the Supreme Court of Canada ==
The Court was evenly divided, 3-3, on each of the questions.

Duff CJ, holding that all Acts were intra vires, as the conventions arose from the Treaty of Versailles, said:

From two main considerations, the conclusion follows that legislative authority in respect of international agreements is, as regards Canada, vested exclusively in the Parliament of Canada.

First, by virtue of section 132 of the British North America Act, jurisdiction, legislative and executive, for the purpose of giving effect to any treaty obligation imposed upon Canada, or any one of the provinces of Canada, by force of a treaty between the British Empire and a foreign country, is committed to the Parliament and Government of Canada. This jurisdiction of the Dominion, the Privy Council held, in the Aeronautics case and in the Radio case is exclusive; and consequently, under the British North America Act, the provinces have no power and never had power to legislate for the purpose of giving effect to an international agreement: that, as a subject of legislation, is excluded from the jurisdiction envisaged by section 92.

Second, as a result of the constitutional development of the last thirty years (and more particularly of the last twenty years) Canada has acquired the status of an international unit, that is to say, she has been recognized by His Majesty the King, by the other nations of the British Commonwealth of Nations, and by the nations of the world, as possessing a status enabling her to enter into, on her own behalf, international arrangements, and to incur obligations under such arrangements. These arrangements may take various forms. They may take the form of treaties, in the strict sense, between heads of states, to which His Majesty the King is formally a party. They may take, inter alia, the form of agreements between governments, in which His Majesty does not formally appear, Canada being represented by the Governor General in Council or by a delegate or delegates authorized directly by him. Whatever the form of the agreement, it is now settled that, as regards Canada, it is the Canadian Government acting on its own responsibility to the Parliament of Canada which deals with the matter. If the international contract is in the form of a treaty between heads of states, His Majesty acts, as regards Canada, on the advice of his Canadian Government.

Necessarily, in virtue of the fundamental principles of our constitution, the Canadian Government in exercising these functions is under the control of Parliament. Parliament has full power by legislation to determine the conditions under which international agreements may be entered into and to provide for giving effect to them. That this authority is exclusive would seem to follow inevitably from the circumstances that the Lieutenant-Governors of the provinces do not in any manner represent His Majesty in external affairs, and that the provincial governments are not concerned with such affairs: the effect of the two decisions reported in 1932 Appeal Cases is that in all these matters the authority of Parliament is not merely paramount, but exclusive.

In his dissent, Rinfret J (as he then was) argued that the conventions were separate and did not arise as a consequence of the Treaty, the 1925 Reference was binding, and moreover that they were not properly ratified at all, declaring:

The treaty-making power is the prerogative of the Crown. In ordinary practice, it is exercised on the recommendation of the Crown’s advisers.

In Canada, the practice has grown gradually to enter into international conventions through the medium of the Governor in Council. It does appear that it would be directly against the intendment of the British North America Act that the King or the Governor General should enter into an international agreement dealing with matters exclusively assigned to the jurisdiction of the provinces solely upon the advice of the federal Ministers who, either by themselves or even through the instrumentality of the Dominion Parliament are prohibited by the Constitution from assuming jurisdiction over these matters.

I would like to conclude with the words of Lord Watson, in the Maritime Bank case:

The object of the Act was neither to weld the provinces into one, nor to subordinate provincial governments to a central authority, but to create a federal government in which they should all be represented, entrusted with the exclusive administration of affairs in which they had a common interest, each province retaining its independence and autonomy.

It follows from all that I have said that, in my opinion, the draft conventions upon which is based the legislation now submitted to us have not been properly and competently ratified, that they could not be so ratified without the consent of the legislature in each province, both by force of the British North America Act and upon the proper interpretation of article 405 of the Treaty of Versailles; and that, for that reason, the Acts now submitted are ultra vires of the Parliament of Canada.

== Appeal to the Privy Council ==
The Board held that all Acts were ultra vires. In his ruling, Lord Atkin held:

- "The obligations [arising from the conventions] are not obligations of Canada as part of the British Empire, but of Canada, by virtue of her new status as an international person, and do not arise under a treaty between the British Empire and foreign countries."
- "No obligation to legislate in respect of any of the matters in question arose until the Canadian executive, left with an unfettered discretion of its own volition, acceded to the conventions, a novus actus not determined by the [Treaty of Versailles]."
- "For the purposes of sections 91 and 92 [of the BNA Act] ... there is no such thing as treaty legislation as such."
- "The question is not how the obligation is formed, that is the function of the executive: but how is the obligation to be performed and that depends upon the authority of the competent legislature or legislatures."

Even though the Statute of Westminster 1931 had made Canada fully independent in governing its foreign affairs, the Board held that s. 132 did not accordingly evolve to take that into account. As noted at the end of the judgment,

It must not be thought that the result of this decision is that Canada is incompetent to legislate in performance of treaty obligations. In totality of legislative powers, Dominion and Provincial together, she is fully equipped. But the legislative powers remain distributed and if in the exercise of her new functions derived from her new international status she incurs obligations they must, so far as legislation be concerned when they deal with provincial classes of subjects, be dealt with by the totality of powers, in other words by co-operation between the Dominion and the Provinces. While the ship of state now sails on larger ventures and into foreign waters she still retains the watertight compartments which are an essential part of her original structure.

== Aftermath ==
=== Labour relations ===
The scope of the federal jurisdiction with respect to labour relations, as determined by the 1925 reference, continued to apply until 1955, when the Stevedores Reference held that it extended to all works and undertakings falling under it. In that judgment, Abbott J declared:

The right to strike and the right to bargain collectively are now generally recognized, and the determination of such matters as hours of work, rates of wages, working conditions and the like, is in my opinion, a vital part of the management and operation of any commercial or industrial undertaking. This being so, the power to regulate such matters, in the case of undertakings which fall within the legislative authority of Parliament lies with Parliament and not with the Provincial Legislatures.

=== Federalism ===
The Reference served to promote the concept of dual federalism, where the provinces could act as separate communities within a wider political union. As a result, spillover effects by an Act passed by one level of government onto the other level are not tolerated, and are dealt with by the courts through declaring the measure to be ultra vires, or "read down" so that it remains within the jurisdiction of the originating legislature.

As to its general effect on federal and provincial jurisdiction, it has been suggested that the "watertight compartments" doctrine, generally construed as stating that nothing can be added or taken away, may be more properly described as meaning that a head of power can encompass more than it did at the beginning of Canadian Confederation in 1867, but it should not encompass less. The Supreme Court in 2011 summarized its present approach in Reference re Securities Act:

[56] The Judicial Committee of the Privy Council, which was the final arbiter of Canada’s Constitution until 1949, tended to favour an exclusive powers approach. Thus, Lord Atkin in 1937 famously described the respective powers of Parliament and the provincial legislatures as "watertight compartments".... However, the Judicial Committee recognized that particular matters might have both federal and provincial aspects and overlap.... Privy Council jurisprudence also recognized that the Constitution must be viewed as a "living tree capable of growth and expansion within its natural limits".... This metaphor has endured as the preferred approach in constitutional interpretation, ensuring "that Confederation can be adapted to new social realities"....

[57] The Supreme Court of Canada, as final arbiter of constitutional disputes since 1949, moved toward a more flexible view of federalism that accommodates overlapping jurisdiction and encourages intergovernmental cooperation—an approach that can be described as the "dominant tide" of modern federalism...

=== External relations ===
The Reference expressly left undecided the question as to the extent of the federal power to negotiate, sign and ratify treaties that deal with areas falling within provincial jurisdiction.

After 1949, the Supreme Court tended to side more with the federal government; subsequently, in 1955, it ruled that international agreements between provinces and foreign governments were allowed only if they did not involve treaty obligations but merely reciprocal or concurrent legislative action.

This judgment has generated extensive debate about the complications that were introduced in implementing Canada's subsequent international obligations, and it has been condemned for being out of touch with Canadian economic and political realities. The Supreme Court of Canada has indicated in several dicta that it may be ready to revisit the issue in an appropriate case.

An indication that that may eventually happen came in a comment by Dickson CJ in 1987:

The history of Canadian constitutional law has been to allow for a fair amount of interplay and indeed overlap between federal and provincial powers. It is true that doctrines like interjurisdictional and Crown immunity and concepts like "watertight compartments" qualify the extent of that interplay. But it must be recognized that these doctrines and concepts have not been the dominant tide of constitutional doctrines; rather they have been an undertow against the strong pull of pith and substance, the aspect doctrine and, in recent years, a very restrained approach to concurrency and paramountcy issues.
