= Law Society of British Columbia v Mangat =

- Supreme Court of Canada

Hearing: March 21, 2001 Judgment: October 18, 2001
- Full case name: Law Society of British Columbia v Jaswant Singh Mangat, Westcoast Immigration Consultants Limited, and Jill Sparling
- Citations: [2001] 3 S.C.R. 113, 2001 SCC 67
- Ruling: Appeal dismissed.

Court membership
- Chief Justice: Beverley McLachlin; Puisne Justices: Claire L'Heureux-Dubé, Charles Gonthier, Frank Iacobucci, John C. Major, Michel Bastarache, Ian Binnie, Louise Arbour, Louis LeBel

Reasons given
- Unanimous reasons by: Gonthier J.

Law Society of British Columbia v Mangat [2001] 3 S.C.R. 113, 2001 SCC 67 is a leading Supreme Court of Canada decision where the Court held that a non-lawyer may be given the power to practice law under a federal statute even if it is contrary to provincial legal profession legislation.

== Background ==
The respondent, Jaswant Mangat, was an immigration consultant carrying on his work through an immigration consulting company ("Westcoast"). He had not studied law in Canada and was not a member of the B.C. Law Society. Mangat and other Westcoast employees engaged in a number of activities involving immigration proceedings, including appearing as counsel or advocate on behalf of aliens, for or in the expectation of a fee from the persons for whom the acts were performed, before the Immigration and Refugee Board ("IRB").

The Law Society brought an application seeking a permanent injunction against Mangat and Westcoast to prevent them from engaging in the ongoing practice of law, in contravention of B.C.’s Legal Profession Act. Mangat and Westcoast admitted that they were engaged in the practice of law within the meaning of s. 1 of the Legal Profession Act, but contended that their conduct was sanctioned by ss. 30 and 69(1) of the federal Immigration Act, which permit non-lawyers to appear on behalf of clients before the IRB. The judge issued the injunction on the grounds that ss. 30 and 69(1) of the Immigration Act did not authorize the practice of law. Alternatively, she would have granted the injunction on the basis that the provisions were ultra vires Parliament. The Court of Appeal set aside the injunction. The central issues raised by the appeal were whether ss. 30 and 69(1) of the Immigration Act are intra vires Parliament, and whether s. 26 of the Legal Profession Act, which prohibits a person, other than a member of the Law Society in good standing or a person listed in the exceptions, to engage in the practice of law, is constitutionally inoperative to persons acting under ss. 30 and 69(1) of the Immigration Act and its associated Rules and Regulations. In that Court, the respondent Jill Sparling was added to the proceedings on the basis that she was an immigration consultant engaged in the same activities as Mangat, given that he had become a member of the Alberta Law Society soon after leave to appeal was granted by that Court.

== Opinion of the Court ==
Justice Gonthier wrote the opinion for a unanimous court. He held that those sections of the Immigration Act addressed a valid subject matter of the federal government, and that Mangat was allowed to practice law in front of the Board under the provisions of the Immigration Act.

Given the clear overlap of laws, Gonthier considered whether to apply the paramountcy doctrine or the inter-jurisdictional immunity doctrine to resolve the conflict. He found that the paramountcy doctrine was more appropriate as there was a clear double aspect in the law.

The first part of the paramountcy test asks whether there is an "operational conflict between federal and provincial laws", where "compliance with one is defiance of the other". Gonthier found that the purpose of the federal law was to authorize non-lawyers to appear as counsel in immigration tribunals for a fee, but the provincial law made exercise of the authority impossible. Consequently, the paramountcy doctrine could be invoked and the provincial law was held to be inoperative to the extent of the conflict.

== See also ==
- List of Supreme Court of Canada cases (McLachlin Court)
