= Natural Products Marketing Act =

1934 Act of the Parliament of Canada

The Natural Products Marketing Act was passed by the government of R. B. Bennett in 1934. It was the subject of an appeal to the Judicial Committee of the Privy Council, which delivered its judgment on 28 January 1937, along with the repudiations of three labour statutes and the Employment and Social Insurance Act, all passed by Bennett.

The contention of the province of British Columbia was that the legislation impinged on its own powers, and was thus ultra vires. The Supreme Court of Canada had unanimously answered the question in the affirmative. The judges in London agreed, and called for unspecified "co-operation" in place of contentious legislation; this co-operation has come to be functional since then in the periodic federal-provincial meetings.

== See also ==
- Employment and Social Insurance Act
- Limitation of Hours of Work Act
- Minimum Wages Act
- Weekly Rest In Industrial Undertakings Act
