= Quebec (AG) v Lacombe =

- Supreme Court of Canada

Hearing: October 14, 2009 Judgment: October 15, 2010
- Full case name: Attorney General of Quebec v Anabelle Lacombe, Jacques Picard, 3845443 Canada Inc and Canadian Owners and Pilots Association
- Citations: 2010 SCC 38 (CanLII), [2010] 2 SCR 453
- Docket No.: 32608
- Prior history: Appealed from Lacombe c. Sacré-Cœur (Municipalité de), 2008 QCCA 426 (CanLII), 2008 QCCA 426, [2008] R.J.Q. 598, SOQUIJ AZ-50478099, [2008] Q.J. No. 1595 (QL), 2008 CarswellQue 13000, reversing a decision of the Superior Court, 2006 QCCS 1171, [2006] R.D.I. 320, SOQUIJ AZ-50359210, [2006] J.Q. no 1948 (QL), 2006 CarswellQue 1973.

Court membership
- Chief Justice: Beverley McLachlin; Puisne Justices: Ian Binnie, Louis LeBel, Marie Deschamps, Morris Fish, Rosalie Abella, Louise Charron, Marshall Rothstein, Thomas Cromwell

Reasons given
- Majority: McLachlin C.J.
- Concurrence: LeBel J.
- Dissent: Deschamps J.

Quebec (AG) v Lacombe, 2010 SCC 38, [2010] 2 SCR 453, is a decision of the Supreme Court of Canada on the nature of the ancillary powers that arise from the doctrine of pith and substance in Canadian constitutional law.

== The facts ==
Lac Gobeil Water Aerodrome has been conducting a business of air excursions on Lac Gobeil in the municipality of Sacré‑Coeur since 2005. It was licensed under the Aeronautics Act to conduct such a business, and registered its aerodrome pursuant to the Canadian Aviation Regulations.

Until 1995, the municipality's zoning by-law did not allow for water aerodromes or aeronautics in general to be conducted on Lac Gobeil. The by-law was amended to allow such activity for part of the lake, but not the part in which the aerodrome in question was operating. The municipality applied for an injunction ordering the company to cease its aviation activities on Lac Gobeil on the ground that operation of the aerodrome and the associated business in that zone violated the by‑law.

== The courts below ==
The Superior Court of Quebec found that the legislation at issue was a valid municipal zoning by‑law, with only incidental effects on the federal subject of aeronautics.

The Quebec Court of Appeal set aside that decision, concluding that the by‑law, though valid, could not apply to the aerodrome because of the doctrine of interjurisdictional immunity.

== Judgment of the Supreme Court ==
The appeal was dismissed. The evidence revealed that the real object of the by‑law was not related to zoning and did not fall under any provincial head of power. Rather, its essence was to regulate the location of water aerodromes in the municipality, a matter within the exclusive federal jurisdiction over aeronautics. Since the by‑law was, in pith and substance, about the regulation of aeronautics, it fell outside provincial jurisdiction.

The by‑law was not saved by the ancillary powers doctrine. Under that doctrine, a provision which is, in pith and substance, outside the competence of its enacting body will be saved where it is an important part of a broader legislative scheme that is within the competence of the enacting body.

- The degree of integration required increases in proportion to the seriousness of the encroachment.
- Where the impugned measure encroaches only slightly on the jurisdiction of the other level of government, a rational, functional connection is required.
- As the degree of intrusion grows more serious, the required degree of integration tends toward a test of necessity.
- The by‑law did not constitute a serious intrusion on federal jurisdiction and the rational functional test was applicable. To meet the test, a prima facie invalid measure must complement rather than merely supplement the legislative scheme. It must, both rationally and in its function, further the purposes of the valid legislative scheme of which it is said to be part.

The amendment was passed to protect the use of Lac Gobeil and similar areas by vacationers. However, it did not confine its ban on aerodromes to vacation areas. Rather, it banned aerodromes throughout the municipality, which spans a variety of land uses. It did not function as zoning legislation, but rather, as a stand‑alone prohibition. It treated similar parcels differently, and different parcels the same, belying the first principle of zoning legislation.

In any event, if the zoning by‑law did have the effect of prohibiting water aerodromes, it would be inapplicable to the extent it did so, under the doctrine of interjurisdictional immunity. A prohibition on aerodromes, even as part of a broad class of land uses, would result in an unacceptable narrowing of Parliament’s legislative options. This would have the effect of impairing the core of the federal power over aeronautics.

== Impact ==
This case, together with the concurrent case of Quebec (Attorney General) v. Canadian Owners and Pilots Association, has further added to the Court's jurisprudence on Canadian federalism in a significant manner. There has been discussion as to the consistency of these rulings in comparison to previous jurisprudence.
