= Canada (AG) v PHS Community Services Society =

- Supreme Court of Canada

Hearing: May 12, 2011 Judgment: September 30, 2011
- Full case name: Canada (Attorney General) v PHS Community Services Society
- Citations: 2011 SCC 44, [2011] 3 SCR 144
- Docket No.: 33556
- Prior history: APPEAL and CROSS‑APPEAL from PHS Community Services Society v. Canada (Attorney General), 2010 BCCA 15 (15 January 2010), affirming PHS Community Services Society v. Attorney General of Canada, 2008 BCSC 661 (27 May 2008) and PHS Community Services Society v. Canada (Attorney General), 2008 BCSC 1453 (31 October 2008)
- Ruling: Appeal and cross-appeal dismissed. The Minister of Health is ordered to grant an exemption to Insite under s. 56 of the CDSA forthwith.

Court membership
- Chief Justice: Beverley McLachlin; Puisne Justices: Ian Binnie, Louis LeBel, Marie Deschamps, Morris Fish, Rosalie Abella, Louise Charron, Marshall Rothstein, Thomas Cromwell

Reasons given
- Unanimous reasons by: McLachlin CJ

Canada (AG) v PHS Community Services Society, [2011] 3 SCR 144, 2011 SCC 44, is a leading Supreme Court of Canada case dealing with the application of the criminal law and healthcare heads of power found in section 91 and section 92 of the Constitution Act, 1867 and the principles of fundamental justice in section 7 of the Canadian Charter of Rights and Freedoms.

== Background ==
In September 2003, the Vancouver Coastal Health Authority and the Portland Hotel Society opened Insite, North America's first supervised drug injection site, in Downtown Eastside Vancouver, an area of high drug use. s 4(1) and 5(1) of the Controlled Drugs and Substances Act (CDSA) prohibited the possession and trafficking of controlled substances, and so in order to operate, Insite was obligated to apply for an exemption for medical and scientific purposes from the CDSA. The federal Minister of Health, whose discretionary powers under s 56 of the CDSA permitted the granting of exemptions, allowed Insite's application. Insite received further extensions on their exemption in 2006 and 2007. In 2008, Minister of Health Tony Clement failed to extend the exemption, casting doubt on Insite's ability to operate the facility in the future. In response, Insite launched a court challenge against the federal government.

== The courts below ==
At trial before the Supreme Court of British Columbia, Insite argued that s 4(1) and 5(1) of the CDSA were inapplicable to Insite because of the interjurisdictional immunity granted to them as a health facility. Insite argued that applying the CDSA provisions to their facility in the absence of an exemption would violate their s 7 rights upon application. In the alternative, Insite argued that the Minister of Health had violated their s 7 rights by failing to extend the exemption. The trial judge rejected Insite's interjurisdictional immunity argument, noting instead the primacy of double aspect in Canadian constitutional law. However, the trial judge found that s 4(1) and 5(1) of the CDSA violated Insite's s 7 Charter rights because they "arbitrarily prohibited the management of addiction and its associated risks", and they could not be saved by s 1 of the Charter. The trial judge thus granted Insite a constitutional exemption and issued a suspended declaration of invalidity regarding s 4(1) and 5(1) of the CDSA.

Upon appeal by the federal government to the British Columbia Court of Appeal, the majority of the court affirmed the trial judge's decision, agreeing with the result of the trial judge's Charter and interjurisdictional immunity analyses.

== Decision of the Supreme Court ==
The court unanimously dismissed the appeal and cross-appeal on the basis of a s 7 argument, although it found no division of powers flaw in the CDSA.

=== Division of powers ===
The court found that s 4(1) and 5(1) of the CDSA were valid exercises of the federal law criminal power, per R v Malmo-Levine, where the court held that "protection of public health and safety from the effects of addictive drugs is a valid criminal law purpose". The court rejected the respondents' argument that the provinces could be exempt from the federal criminal law power if they established an activity serving the public interest. The court ruled also that interjurisdictional immunity could not shield the provinces from the federal criminal law power, given the narrowing of that doctrine in the Supreme Court's ruling in Canadian Western Bank v Alberta.

This restraint arises from the SCC's 2010 ruling in Quebec (AG) v Canadian Owners and Pilots Assn, where three related concerns were identified with the doctrine:

1. it is in tension with the dual aspect doctrine,
2. it is in tension with the emergent practice of cooperative federalism, and
3. it may overshoot the federal or provincial power in which it is grounded and create legislative "no go" zones where neither level of government regulates.

The Court further held that the delivery of health care services does not constitute a protected core of the provincial power over health care, because:

1. the proposed core has never been recognized in the jurisprudence, as courts are reluctant to identify new areas where interjurisdictional immunity applies;
2. "the sheer size and diversity of provincial health power render daunting the task of drawing a bright line around a protected provincial core of health where federal legislation may not tread;" and
3. "application of interjurisdictional immunity to a protected core of the provincial health power has the potential to create legal vacuums ... [which are] ... inimical to the very concept of the division of powers."

As McLachlin CJ noted,

[70] In summary, the doctrine of interjurisdictional immunity is narrow. Its premise of fixed watertight cores is in tension with the evolution of Canadian constitutional interpretation towards the more flexible concepts of double aspect and cooperative federalism. To apply it here would disturb settled competencies and introduce uncertainties for new ones. Quite simply, the doctrine is neither necessary nor helpful in the resolution of the contest here between the federal government and the provincial government.

=== Section 7 of the Charter ===
The court found that s 4(1) of the CDSA engaged s 7 of the Charter but operated in accordance with the principles of fundamental justice. Although that provision touched upon Insite users' life, liberty and security of the person by prohibiting drug possession at Insite, the s 56 exemption prevents s 4(1) of the CDSA from acting arbitrarily, overbroadly or grossly disproportionately upon Insite users.

However, the court found that the Minister's failure to grant the exemption limited Insite users' s 7 Charter rights and breached the principles of fundamental justice. The failure to exempt Insite was arbitrary because it undermined the CDSA's purpose; namely, the "maintenance and promotion of public health and safety". The failure was also grossly disproportionate in that it denied Insite's services, which had not had any "discernable negative impact on the public safety and health objectives of Canada during its eight years of operation".

While the court did not consider whether the Minister's failure to grant an exemption could be saved by s 1 of the Charter, they found that there would have been no rational connection between the Minister's failure to grant the exemption and the CDSA's stated purpose.

The court exercised its s 24(1) Charter power and ordered via mandamus the Minister to grant Insite the exemption. The court noted that the Minister ought to grant future exemption requests when the injection facility would "decrease the risk of death and disease, and there is little or no evidence that it will have a negative impact on public safety".

== See also ==
- List of Supreme Court of Canada cases (McLachlin Court)
