= Employment and Social Insurance Act =

Parliament of Canada
- Enacted by: Parliament of Canada
- Assented to: 1935

The Employment and Social Insurance Act (French: Loi sur le placement et les assurances sociales) was a statute enacted by the Parliament of Canada in 1935 during the final months of the government of R.B. Bennett. The Act was intended to introduce a nationwide employment insurance scheme, and also to convince voters that Bennett was willing to intervene aggressively in the economy, as President Roosevelt had done in the United States with the New Deal. The Act was a key component of the program of interventionist laws known as "Bennett's New Deal."

In 1936, the Act was ruled unconstitutional by the Supreme Court of Canada, as unemployment insurance was found to fall under one of the heads of power assigned by Canada's constitution to the provinces. The ruling of the Supreme Court was upheld by the Judicial Committee of the Privy Council in 1937. The Employment and Social Insurance Act therefore failed to achieve its policy goal, as Canada was left for a time without unemployment insurance.

== Background ==
In 1919 the Royal Commission on Industrial Relations, sometimes called the Mathers Commission, recommended a national program of unemployment insurance.

In 1930, the Conservative government was elected due to a promise of federal action against unemployment. Initially, the federal government pursued the traditional model of providing temporary and emergency funding to municipalities in support of their relief aid. Over time a new policy was developed in an effort to combat public unemployment that would be administered by the federal government and provided nationally.

== Introduction of the Employment and Social Insurance Act ==
R. B. Bennett's government passed the Employment and Social Insurance Act in 1935, to establish a national unemployment scheme. The national unemployment scheme was modeled on the British approach at the time, which included flat-rate financial benefits for the unemployed based on worker, employer, and state contributions. The Act was part of eight interventionist laws, which were collectively characterized as "Bennett's New Deal"—a Canadian version of Franklin D. Roosevelt's New Deal. The "Bennett New Deal" included the Weekly Rest in Industrial Undertakings Act, the Limitations of Hours of Work Act, the Minimum Wages Act, the National Products Marketing Act, the Employment and Social Insurance Act, the Farmers Creditor's Arrangement Act, the Dominion Trade and Industry Commission Act and section 498A of the Criminal Code. This was the Canadian parliament's attempt to deal with the economic hardships of the Great Depression.

The legislation on Unemployment Insurance was struck down in 1936 by a 4 to 2 decision of the Supreme Court, a decision that was upheld in 1937 by the Judicial Committee of the Privy Council. The Supreme Court split 3–3 on the case involving three other pieces of legislation, collectively referred to as the "Labour Conventions Case". These were the Weekly Rest in Industrial Undertakings Act, the Minimum Wages Act, and the Limitations of Hours of Work Act. That split decision would have left those acts in force, but the Judicial Committee of the Privy Council also struck down those laws. The Natural Products Marketing Act was declared ultra vires by the unanimous judgment of both the Supreme Court and the Privy Council. The other three acts were maintained, namely the Farmers Creditor's Arrangement Act, the Dominion Trade and Industry Commission Act and section 498A of the Criminal Code.

The matter that brought this to a head was the unsuccessful attempt by the Bennett government to invoke international treaties to legitimize certain laws that would bring Canada into compliance with Part XIII of the Treaty of Versailles, dealing with labour. In 1919 Canada had, for the first time, been a signatory to an international treaty. The Limitation of Hours of Work Act had been the subject of a legal reference in 1925, and at that time the Supreme Court had held that the Dominion had no legislative power to deal with the matter, and the only thing that could be done by Ottawa was to bring the convention to the attention of the provinces and leave any further action to them.

== Matter of Reference to the Supreme Court of Canada (SCC) and Decisions by the Judicial Committee of the Privy Council (JCPC) ==
On November 5, 1935, the Governor General in Council made a matter of reference regarding the constitutionality of the several Acts, two of which dated from 1934, and the cases were then brought to the SCC. The SCC rendered its judgements on June 17, 1936, invalidating three of those Acts and maintaining the others, as described previously. The judgements were then sent to the Judicial Committee of the Privy Council in the UK, which was then the highest court to settle legal issues of Canada. The JCPC decisions that struck down the Employment and Social Insurance Act as well as the 3 acts concerned by 'Labour Conventions Case' were met with discontent in the English Canadian centralist circles and led to their demanding appeals to London be abolished.

== 1936 "New Deal" Decisions by the Supreme Court of Canada and the Judicial Committee of the Privy Council ==
Act	Supreme Court of Canada Case	Judicial Committee of the Privy Council Case	Final disposal
Section 498A of the Criminal Code	Reference re legislation jurisdiction of Parliament of Canada to enact Section 498A of the Criminal Code (1936) S.C.R. 363 (June 17, 1936)	Attorney General of British Columbia v Attorney General of Canada and others (1937) UKPC 8 (28 January 1937)	Valid legislation
Dominion Trade and Industry Commission Act	Reference re legislative jurisdiction of Parliament of Canada to enact the Dominion Trade and Industry Commission Act, 1935 (1936) S.C.R. 379 (June 17, 1936)	Attorney General of Ontario v Attorney General of Canada and others (1937) UKPC 11 (28 January 1937)	Valid legislation
Farmers’ Creditors Arrangement Act	Reference re legislative jurisdiction of Parliament of Canada to enact the Farmers' Creditors Arrangement Act, 1934, as amended by the Farmers' Creditors Arrangement Act Amendment Act, 1935 (1936) S.C.R. 384 (June 17, 1936)	Attorney General of British Columbia v Attorney General of Canada and others (1937) UKPC 10 (28 January 1937)	Valid legislation
Natural Products Marketing Act	Reference re legislative jurisdiction of Parliament of Canada to enact the Natural Products Marketing Act, 1934, and The Natural Products Marketing Act Amendment Act, 1935 (1936) S.C.R. 398 (June 17, 1936)	Attorney General of British Columbia v Attorney General of Canada and others (1937) UKPC 9 (28 January 1937)	Invalid
Weekly Rest In Industrial Undertakings Act, Minimum Wages Act, Limitation of Hours of Work Act	Reference re legislative jurisdiction of Parliament of Canada to enact the Minimum Wages Act (1935, c. 44) (1936) S.C.R. 461 (June 17, 1936)	Attorney General of Canada v Attorney General of Ontario and others (1937) UKPC 6 (28 January 1937)	Invalid
Employment and Social Insurance Act	Reference re legislative jurisdiction of Parliament of Canada to enact the Employment and Social Insurance Act (1935, c. 48) (1936) S.C.R. 427 (June 17, 1936)	Attorney General of Canada v Attorney General of Ontario and others (1937) UKPC 7 (28 January 1937)	Invalid

== Aftermath ==
In the general election of 1935, the Conservatives lost votes to two new parties, the Co-operative Commonwealth Federation and the Social Credit Party, and were replaced in government by the Liberals led by Mackenzie King, whose proportion of the vote held constant from the last election.

The first compulsory national unemployment insurance program was instituted in August 1940 under the King government after a constitutional amendment was agreed to by all of the Canadian provinces, to concede to the federal government legislative power over unemployment insurance. New Brunswick, Alberta and Quebec had held out against the federal government's desire to amend the constitution but ultimately acceded to its request, Alberta being the last to do so. The British North America Act s. 91 was amended by adding in a heading designated Number 2A simply in the words "Unemployment Insurance".

== See also ==
- Limitation of Hours of Work Act
- Minimum Wages Act
- Natural Products Marketing Act
- Weekly Rest In Industrial Undertakings Act
