= Neuville Airport =

Neuville Airport Québec/Neuville Airport
- IATA: none; ICAO: none; TC LID: CNV9

Summary
- Airport type: Private
- Owner: Neuville Aéro
- Serves: Quebec City
- Location: Neuville, Quebec
- Time zone: EST (UTC−05:00)
  - Summer (DST): EDT (UTC−04:00)
- Elevation AMSL: 314 ft / 96 m
- Coordinates: 46°43′24″N 071°34′57″W
- Website: aeroportdeneuville.ca/

Map
- Location in Quebec

Runways
| Direction | Length | | Surface |
| Direction | ft | m | Surface |
|---|---|---|---|
| 06/24 | 3,000 | 914 | Asphalt/gravel |
- Source: Canada Flight Supplement

Neuville Airport (TC LID: CNV9) is a privately owned general aviation aerodrome operated by Neuville Aéro. It is located 16 nautical miles (30 km; 18 mi) west of Quebec City and 1.1 NM (2.0 km; 1.3 mi) northeast of the village of Neuville, Quebec, in Canada.

Built in 2012, the airfield, which includes a 3,000 ft (914 m) runway and a hangar is primarily intended for owners of light aircraft. Construction and commissioning of the aerodrome is hotly contested by a group of citizens, the town and the Quebec government, among others, on a variety of environmental and jurisdictional grounds.

== Background ==
The project to build a general aviation airfield in Neuville began in early 2011, a few months after the October 2010 Supreme Court of Canada ruling in the Quebec (Attorney General) v. Canadian Owners and Pilots Association case. In essence, the 7–2 ruling (Note: Quebec justices Marie Deschamps and Louis LeBel wrote dissident opinions.) confirmed the Government of Canada's exclusive jurisdiction on the establishment of airfields and declared inoperative any municipal or provincial legislation, such as the Quebec Act Respecting the Preservation of Agricultural Land and Agricultural Activities, limiting places where such activities can take place. Within the current legal framework, an airfield can be built anywhere in Canada — except in built-up areas of towns and villages — provided certain safety standards are met. Promoters also have to inform Transport Canada about the airfield location in order to be included on aeronautical charts. The first project failed.

A second group of seven businessmen from Montreal, Pont-Rouge and Quebec and led by Martin Mercier, Jean-Marc Carpentier et Raymond Carpentier was formed to build the airfield. Despite a series of resolutions adopted at the council and aimed at obstructing the project, the town resigned itself to negotiate with the developer in order to limit the impact of the airfield on residents.

Soon after the town and the promoters signed a memorandum of understanding (MOU) on November 1, 2011, the company tried to reach an agreement with Les Ailes québécoises, a recreational aviation club with about forty aircraft. Based at Quebec City's Jean-Lesage International, the club was considering a move in 2013, because of an ongoing expansion project of the region's main airport and an expected rent increase. Divided on the 73-percent rent increase proposed by the airport authority for a lease renewal effective in 2013, two-thirds of club members declined an offer to move to Neuville in January 2012. Despite this setback, the developers promised to go ahead with their project, stressing that they had received expressions of interest from individual aircraft owners.

== Facilities ==
The aerodrome is built on a farming lot purchased from a produce farmer in the fall of 2011 for C$350,000. It is located near the intersection of Gravel Road and Autoroute 40, close to exit 285. The promoter describes its airfield as "small, but high-quality". The $2-million facility can host up to 25 aircraft.

Initial work started in mid-November 2011 and from that moment, aircraft started to land on grass. The construction of the 3,000 ft (914 m) runway began in January 2012; it was paved in May. The heated hangar is made of six 60 × 40 feet (18 × 12 m) sections equipped with retractable doors and can accommodate from 12 to 18 aircraft, depending on size. Construction of the hangar and the 10-position tarmac was completed in August 2012. Aviation gasoline is sold on the premises and a payphone is also available.

The airport has electricity since early May 2012, after Neuville Aéro threatened the government-owned utility Hydro-Québec with a lawsuit because of delays in connecting the aerodrome to the power grid.

== Controversy ==
A group of citizens of the municipality of 3,700 has set up the Neuville Committee for the Defense of the Common Good (French: Comité neuvillois pour la défense du bien commun), to mobilize against the airfield. Grounds for opposition to the airfield range from noise, non-compliance with Quebec laws, municipal and regional zoning by-laws, the impact of leaded gasoline use in general aviation and the proximity of the runway to some homes. From the outset, the opposition group circulated petitions, started Facebook pages and organized demonstrations and picket lines in late 2011 and throughout 2012. On March 31, 2012, the group organized a gathering of 600 people, including Neuville mayor Bernard Gaudreau, provincial and federal elected officials and representatives of various organizations, for a rally in front of the Neuville town hall.

Developers, who received the support of a group of Quebec bush pilots, the Quebec Air Transport Association and the Canadian Owners and Pilots Association, are stressing that this aerodrome would strengthen the general aviation sector in Quebec. Feeling that they face a "rearguard" of opponents, Neuville Aéro defended its approach, calling it "an example to follow in terms of municipal consultation". In a statement quoted by Le Soleil newspaper, the company said his group met seven times with the mayor, town councilors and municipal staff before the MOU was signed, that Neuville was able to present its "expectations and demands" and that the town suggested suitable sites.

The National Assembly of Quebec unanimously passed a motion opposing the aerodrome on March 27, 2012. The Minister of Municipal Affairs and Minister of Transport of Quebec, Sylvain Gaudreault, reaffirmed the opposition of the Parti Québécois government to the airfield. Regional minister Agnès Maltais has said her government's stand was a matter of defending Quebec's territory and laws that are "flouted". Three opposition parties in the Canadian House of Commons, three municipal federations, including the Federation of Canadian Municipalities, as well as several rural and environmental groups also oppose the airfield.

Although the local NDP MP, Élaine Michaud, tabled a 2,000-name petition to the House of Commons asking the federal Minister of Transport Denis Lebel to act on their behalf, the Conservative government chose not to intervene, stating that its role in aeronautics is limited to "promote economic development of a stable aviation sector" and to "promote air safety". In a statement to Parliament, the minister said he would not intervene because the Neuville airfield posed "no safety issue".

== Court case ==
In March 2012, Neuville Aéro has received two summons from the municipality for by-law violations during construction. Development of the airfield has also led to the exposure of Campagna creek banks, in contravention with Quebec environment laws according to an investigation by the regional county municipality (MRC), which was leaked to the opponents group in July 2012. Since then, developers promised to restore the banks under a protocol approved by the Quebec Department of the Environment.

Two private citizens filed a lawsuit in Quebec Superior Court in May 2012 to challenge an administrative decision from Transport Canada to the effect that the aerodrome is not located in a "built-up area". In November 2012, Judge Pierre Ouellet determined that the relief sought by the two plaintiffs was outside his purview, noting that the Federal Court of Canada had an "exclusive jurisdiction" to adjudicate cases related to aeronautics. The decision is in line with a petition filed in the case by the promoters.

In January 2013, the two plaintiffs appealed the ruling, arguing that the judge had jurisdiction to hear the case. The two citizens are also trying to raise money to help pay legal costs, saying they're "in for the long haul".
