= Union Colliery Co of British Columbia v Bryden =

Canadian constitutional decision

- Court: Judicial Committee of the Privy Council
- Full case name: Union Colliery Company of British Columbia, Limited and others v John Bryden
- Decided: 28 July 1899
- Citation: [1899] UKPC 58, [1899] AC 580

Case history
- Appealed from: Supreme Court of British Columbia

Court membership
- Judges sitting: Lord Watson, Lord Hobhouse, Lord Macnaghten, Sir Richard Couch, Sir Edward Fry

Case opinions
- Decision by: Lord Watson

Union Colliery Co of British Columbia v Bryden is a Canadian constitutional decision of the Judicial Committee of the Privy Council where the exclusivity principle in Canadian federalism and pith and substance analysis was first articulated.

Bryden was a shareholder in Union Colliery, a coal mining company in British Columbia, and was troubled by the company's practice of employing "Chinamen" and putting them into positions of authority. He sought an injunction against the company for violating section 4 of the provincial Coal Mines Regulation Act of 1890, which prohibited hiring "Chinamen" to work in coal mines. Union Colliery challenged the constitutionality of Act, arguing that the prohibition related to matters of naturalization and was under the jurisdiction of the federal government under section 91(25) of the British North America Act, 1867. Bryden, however, argued that since the federal government had no laws covering the matter the province was allowed to step in and legislate on it.

The issue before the council was whether the provinces could legislate in matters under federal jurisdiction where the federal government has remained silent.

The Council held that the pith and substance of the provision was in relation to "aliens and naturalized subjects" and did fall within the federal jurisdiction. They also held that the federal government did not need to pass laws in all areas within their jurisdiction, and under the exclusivity principle the province can never intrude upon the federal jurisdiction. It is only where the two governments make an explicit agreement can the province legislate in federal matters.

== See also ==
- List of Judicial Committee of the Privy Council cases
- List of Supreme Court of Canada cases
