= Practice of law =

Acting as a lawyer

In its most general sense, the practice of law involves giving legal advice to clients, drafting legal documents for clients, and representing clients in legal negotiations and court proceedings such as lawsuits, and is applied to the professional services of a lawyer or attorney at law, barrister, solicitor, or civil law notary; however, there is a substantial amount of overlap between the practice of law and various other professions where clients are represented by agents. These professions include real estate, banking, accounting, and insurance. Moreover, a growing number of legal document assistants (LDAs) are offering services which have traditionally been offered only by lawyers and their employee paralegals. Many documents may now be created by computer-assisted drafting libraries, where the clients are asked a series of questions that are posed by the software in order to construct the legal documents. In addition, regulatory consulting firms also provide advisory services on regulatory compliance that were traditionally provided exclusively by law firms.

== United States ==
In the United States, the practice of law is conditioned upon admission to practice of law, and specifically admission to the bar of a particular state or other territorial jurisdiction. The American Bar Association and the American Law Institute are among the organizations that are concerned with the interests of lawyers as a profession and the promulgation of uniform standards of professionalism and ethics, but regulation of the practice of law is left to the individual states, and their definitions vary.

=== Unauthorized practice of law ===
"Unauthorized practice of law" (UPL) is an act sometimes prohibited by statute, regulation, or court rules.

==== Definition ====
The definition of "unauthorized practice of law" is variable, and is often conclusory and tautological, i.e., it is the doing of a lawyer's or counselor's work by a non-lawyer for money. There is some agreement that appearing in a legally constituted court in a legal proceeding to represent clients (particularly for a fee) is considered to be unauthorized practice of law. But other variations are subject to interpretation and conflicting regulation, particularly as to the scope and breadth of the prohibition. Black's Law Dictionary defines unauthorized practice of law as "The practice of law by a person, typically a nonlawyer, who has not been licensed or admitted to practice law in a given jurisdiction." The Restatement (Third) of the Law Governing Lawyers notes:

The definitions and tests employed by courts to delineate unauthorized practice by non-lawyers have been vague or conclusory, while jurisdictions have differed significantly in describing what constitutes unauthorized practice in particular areas.

Certain activities, such as the representation of another person in litigation, are generally proscribed. Even in that area, many jurisdictions recognize exceptions for such matters as small-claims and landlord-tenant tribunals and certain proceedings in administrative agencies. Moreover, many jurisdictions have authorized law students and others not locally admitted to represent indigent persons or others as part of clinical legal education programs. ...

What is more controversial is out-of-court activities, particularly drafting of documents and giving advice, and whether that is considered to be unauthorized practice of law. Some states have defined the "practice of law" to include those who appear as a representative in arbitration or act as arbitrators in disputes. For example, there is a growing conflict between the multijurisdictional practice of law in arbitration proceedings in the financial service industry and state regulation of lawyers. With a few exceptions, the general rule is that an appearance at an arbitration does not constitute the practice of law.

The United States bankruptcy court for the Eastern District of Tennessee has held that "providing clients with explanations or definitions of such legal terms of art ... is, by itself, giving legal advice." The North Carolina State Bar has held that "definition of lien law terms, warnings regarding time requirements, and reminders about sending out preliminary notices within five to ten days of beginning work, when combined with its preparation of legal documents [in the manner described], constitute providing legal advice."

Texas law generally prohibits a person who is not an attorney from representing a client in a personal injury or property damage matter, and punishes a violation as a misdemeanor. Some states also criminalize the separate behavior of falsely claiming to be lawyer (in Texas, for example, this is a felony if done to obtain economic benefit).

==== Enforcement ====
Criminal laws and enforcement of "Unauthorized Practice of Law (UPL)" statutes is the organized bar's preferred method. In Florida, the unauthorized practice of law is a third degree felony, which is punishable by up to six months in prison and $5000 in fines. New Jersey has a law which makes it a "disorderly persons offense" to knowingly to engage in the unauthorized practice of law, and a "crime in the fourth degree" to commit UPL if one (a) creates a false impression that one is a lawyer; (b) derives a benefit from UPL, or (c) causes an injury by UPL. In a 2015 survey by the American Bar Association, Florida had the largest budget—$1.8 million—nationwide for prosecuting the unauthorized practice of law. The state has interest in protecting the public from having unqualified persons hold themselves out as licensed professionals, but the existence of laws against unauthorized practice of itself does not guarantee that unlicensed professionals will be detected and those laws enforced.

==== History and future ====
The American Bar Association proposed model rules regarding the unauthorized practice of law, which Judge Richard Posner characterized as an attempt to perpetuate a monopoly to the disadvantage of consumers. The judge observed that the legal profession is "a cartel of providers of services relating to society's laws" which cartel's focus is to restrict entry. "Modern economists call it 'rent seeking', but throughout recorded history, skilled crafts and professions have tried to raise their members' incomes by using the power of the state to limit entry."

The practice of law was not formally regulated in Arizona for a time. However, the Arizona Supreme Court found independent inherent authority to regulate the practice of law. Arizona's statute criminalizing unauthorized practice of law was allowed to lapse from a sunset law in 1985. Rose suggests that legislative proposals to recriminalize the unauthorized practice of law have heretofore failed because of anti-lawyer sentiment in Arizona politics. Moreover, Rose asserts that resentment lingers from an unpopular interpretation of the old statute in State Bar v. Arizona Land Title & Trust Co., 90 Ariz. 76 (1961). This ruling imposed sanctions on a title and realty company engaged in drafting contracts. Rose says, "Throughout the country, various jurisdictions have developed numerous tests for defining the practice of law. But none is broader nor more all-encompassing than that articulated in Arizona Title."

==== Attorney participation ====
In the United States, the rules of professional conduct generally prohibit an attorney from assisting a non-attorney from engaging in the unauthorized practice of law. An attorney therefore may not partner with or split fees with a non-attorney in the performance of any sort of legal work. Furthermore, an attorney may not employ a disbarred or suspended attorney in a legal practice where former clients of the disbarred or suspended attorney will be represented.

== Singapore ==
=== Unauthorized practice of law ===
In Singapore, it is a criminal offence if an unauthorised person pretends to be a qualified lawyer or carries out any act that may be performed only by a qualified lawyer. The relevant provision is section 33 of the Legal Profession Act. The penalty on conviction is a fine up to S$25,000 and/or imprisonment up to 6 months. For subsequent convictions, the maximum rises to a fine of S$50,000 and/or imprisonment.

== See also ==
- Disbarment
- Law
- Law degree
- Law Society of British Columbia v Mangat
