= Cushing v Dupuy =

Canadian insolvency law case in the JCPC

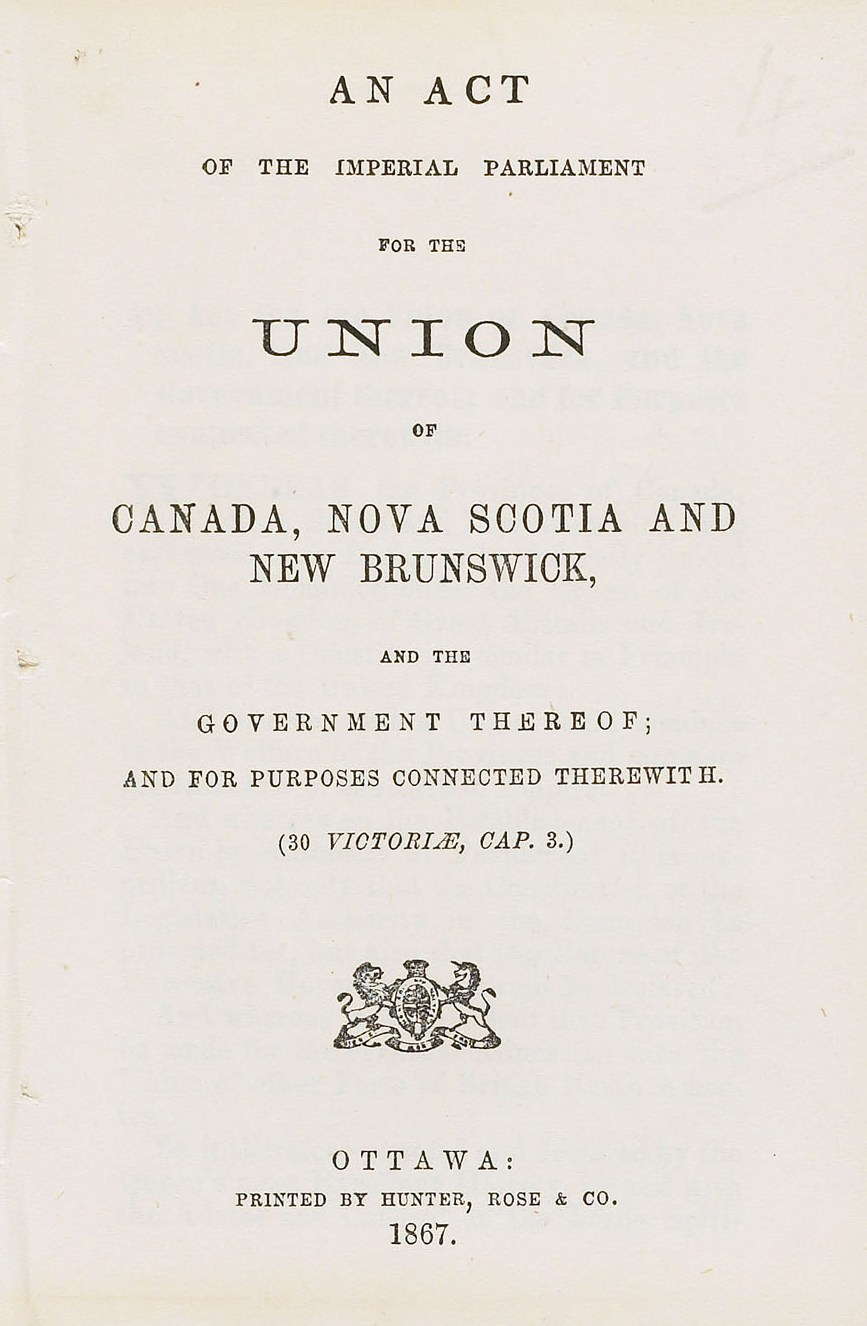
- Cover page of the British North America Act, 1867
- Court: Judicial Committee of the Privy Council
- Full case name: Charles Cushing v Louis Dupuy
- Decided: 15 April 1880
- Citation: 1880 UKPC 22, (1880) 5 AC 409

Case history
- Prior actions: Dupuy v. Cushing, (1878) 22 LCJ 201
- Appealed from: Quebec Court of Queen's Bench (Appeal Side)

Court membership
- Judges sitting: Sir James W. Colvile; Sir Barnes Peacock; Sir Montague E. Smith; Sir Robert P. Collier

Case opinions
- Decision by: Sir Montague E. Smith

Keywords
- Division of powers, insolvency law, finality of judgments, royal prerogative

Cushing v Dupuy is a Canadian constitutional law case decided by the Judicial Committee of the Privy Council in 1880, at that time the highest court of appeal for the British Empire, including Canada. The case was on appeal from the Quebec Court of Queen's Bench (Appeal Side), and dealt with the following issues:

- the federal jurisdiction over insolvency law in Canada,
- when appeals as of right to the Privy Council can be excluded by a local legislature, and
- how the royal prerogative may properly be ousted by statute.

It was also notable for holding that, though the Privy Council would only exceptionally depart from its own previous decisions, it was not bound by them.

The case is included in a collection of significant constitutional decisions from the Judicial Committee, published by the federal Department of Justice.

== Background ==
On 19 July 1877, the brewing company McLeod, McNaughten and Léveillée became insolvent, and Louis Dupuy became its official assignee under a writ of attachment in insolvency. Charles Cushing, a notary, produced a contract of sale executed as a notarial instrument dated 14 March 1877, by which the firm had agreed to sell its plant and effects to him, and demanded their delivery to him. On the same March date, a lease had also been executed by which Cushing agreed to lease back the same assets to the principals of the firm for three years.

In his petition, Cushing asserted that he had taken possession of the assets in March, but no removal took place, and the assets remained in the possession of the firm.

The question posed to the lower courts, which attracted much discussion in their deliberations, was whether the transaction was a valid sale within the meaning of arts. 1027 and 1472 of the Civil Code of Lower Canada.

== Decisions of the Quebec courts ==
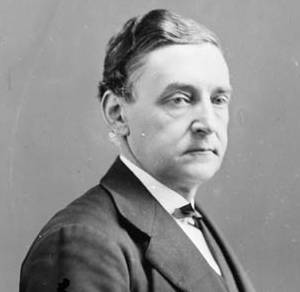
Sir Antoine-Aimé Dorion, CJ

In the Superior Court on 5 October 1877, Cushing's petition was granted, in part. The Superior Court declared that he was the owner of the property specified in the deeds, but refused his application for immediate possession.

Dupuy appealed the ruling to the Court of Queen's Bench (Appeal Side). On 22 March 1878, the Queen's Bench reversed the ruling. Chief Justice Dorion wrote the decision for the Court, concurred in by Cross and Tessier JJ. He held that the sale was fraudulent. It was a simulated sale, intended to create a security on the assets and thus avoid the delivery of possession that was essential for the validity of a pledge under arts. 1966–1970 of the Civil Code. The Court ruled that since Dupuy had retained possession of the property, he had priority over Cushing.

Cushing then applied to the Court of Queen's Bench for leave to appeal from its decision to the Judicial Committee of the Privy Council, which at that time was the highest court of appeal for the British Empire, including Canada. On 22 June 1878, the Court of Queen's Bench refused Cushing leave to appeal, on the grounds that under s. 128 of the federal Insolvent Act of 1875, the decision of the Queen's Bench was final.

== Application for leave to appeal ==
Cushing then directly petitioned the Judicial Committee of the Privy Council for special leave to appeal. The Judicial Committee granted special leave on 27 November 1878, while reserving to Dupuy the power to question whether jurisdiction existed to hear the appeal.

The underlying issue was that appeals lay to the Crown from all colonial courts, as a matter of the royal prerogative. The Crown, as the fountain of justice, had the power to superintend colonial courts. The issue therefore was whether the federal statute had eliminated the prerogative power to entertain appeals with respect to insolvency proceedings.

== Decision of the Judicial Committee ==
Cushing was represented by Sir Charles Peers Davidson, from the Bar of Quebec, while Dupuy was represented by a British barrister, Sir Kenelm Edward Digby.

Sir Montague E. Smith gave the decision for the Committee. He stated that the case raised two general issues: the jurisdiction of the Judicial Committee to hear the appeal, and the question on the merits, if the Committee had jurisdiction. On the first point, he ruled that the Queen's Bench had correctly held that it did not have the power to grant leave to appeal, but that the Judicial Committee still retained jurisdiction under the royal prerogative. On the merits of the dispute, he agreed with the Queen's Bench that there had not been a valid sale of the property and dismissed Cushing's appeal.

As was the practice of the Judicial Committee at that time, Smith gave the decision for the entire committee, with no reasons from any of the other judges.

=== First issue: Jurisdiction of the Judicial Committee ===
Sir Montague Smith stated that in considering the right to appeal, two questions had to be considered:

(1) Did the federal Insolvent Act of 1875 take away the right of appeal to Her Majesty in Council that had previously been granted by art. 1178 of the province's Code of Civil Procedure?
(2) If so, was the power of the Crown to hear the appeal by virtue of its prerogative affected by that Act?

==== Abolition of statutory right of appeal ====
The first question in turn raised two further questions: did the federal Parliament have the power to end the statutory appeal to the Crown in Council, and if so, had Parliament actually done so? Dupuy's argument for federal jurisdiction to eliminate the right of appeal was based on Parliament's jurisdiction over "Bankruptcy and Insolvency" under s. 91(21) of the British North America Act, 1867 (now the Constitution Act, 1867). In opposition to that federal power, Cushing argued that the province had exclusive jurisdiction over "property and civil rights" under s. 92(13) of the British North America Act, 1867, as well as exclusive jurisdiction over civil procedure in the provincial courts (s. 92(14)), which would potentially include appeals.

Sir Montague Smith ruled that the federal Parliament did have the necessary jurisdiction under its power over "Bankruptcy and insolvency", and the federal statute did not intrude on provincial jurisdiction:

It would be impossible to advance a step in the construction of a scheme for the administration of insolvent estates without interfering with and modifying some of the ordinary rights of property, and other civil rights, nor without providing some mode of special procedure for the vesting, realization, and distribution of the estate, and the settlement of the liabilities of the insolvent. Procedure must necessarily form an essential part of any law dealing with insolvency.

On the second point, Sir Montague Smith held that the effect of the federal provision was to extinguish any appeals under the provincial law in relation to the Insolvent Act of 1875. Since the federal law eliminated a right of appeal granted by provincial statute, it did not affect the royal prerogative. He concluded that the Quebec Queen's Bench had correctly held that they did not have the power to grant leave to appeal to the Judicial Committee in matters under the Insolvent Act of 1875.

==== Appeals under the royal prerogative ====
The second issue was whether the federal Act had affected the Crown prerogative to hear appeals, as a separate question from abolishing the statutory right of appeal. Sir Montague Smith held that it was not necessary to consider whether the federal Parliament could abolish appeals under the prerogative, since as a matter of statuory interpretation, the federal statute had not purported to do so. He cited the general principle that the rights of the Crown may only be removed by express words, a principle which had been included in the federal Interpretation Act. He also reviewed other Canadian cases which had considered whether a statute had eliminated the prerogative of appeal, and found that those cases required express wording before they would be held to have eliminated the prerogative power. For example, he quoted the following statement from the Judicial Committee in another Quebec case, Théberge v Laudry:

Their Lordships wish to state distinctly that they desire not to imply any doubt whatever as to the general principle, that the prerogative of the Crown cannot be taken away except by express words; and they would be prepared to hold, as often as has been held before, that in any case where the prerogative of the Crown has existed, precise words must be shown to take away that prerogative.

Since there was nothing in the Insolvent Act of 1875 which referred to appeals under the prerogative, Sir Montague Smith concluded that the prerogative power of the Crown to hear the appeal was not affected by the Act, even though the statutory right of appeal had been extinguished.

The preliminary grant of leave to appeal to Cushing was therefore valid and confirmed: the Judicial Committee had jurisdiction to hear the appeal on the merits.

=== Second issue: Who owned the property? ===
Sir Montague Smith then turned to the merits of the appeal. He reviewed the circumstances of the transaction and found that in form, it was a sale with an immediate lease-back to the insolvent company, who then "...were able to retain the plant and carry on their business as usual." He stated that the Judicial Committee agreed with the conclusion of Chief Justice Dorion and the majority in the Queen's Bench that whatever the nature of the transaction, it was not a bona fide sale. They therefore affirmed the decision of the Queen's Bench, in favour of Dupuy.

== Significance of the decision ==
The case foreshadowed future attempts by the federal government to end appeals to the Judicial Committee. Parliament ended criminal appeals in 1933, and all appeals to the Judicial Committee in 1949.

The crux of the case on the merits, in its holding that the sale was not genuine under art. 1027 of the Civil Code, has since been overtaken by subsequent legal developments in Quebec law, including the rejection of Dorion CJ's contention that creditors are entitled to property remaining in the possession of their debtor as against a third party to whom it has been sold in a bona fide transaction.

While Cushing was notable within Canada for being one of the foundation cases for the doctrine of ancillary powers in Canadian constitutional law, it has also been noteworthy across the Commonwealth for the more general propositions relating to:

- the status of the royal prerogative,
- when judicial decisions may be declared to be final and not subject to further appeal, and
- the question of stare decisis in the matter of Privy Council jurisprudence.

Following the abolition of Canadian appeals to the Judicial Committee of the Privy Council in late 1949, the Minister of Justice and Attorney General of Canada directed the Department of Justice to prepare a compilation of all constitutional cases decided by the Judicial Committee of the Privy Council on the construction and interpretation of the British North America Act, 1867 (now the Constitution Act, 1867), for the assistance of the Canadian Bench and Bar. This case was included in the three volume collection of constitutional decisions of the Judicial Committee.
