= Multiple Access Ltd v McCutcheon =

- Supreme Court of Canada

Hearing: November 25, 26, 1981 Judgment: August 9, 1982
- Full case name: Multiple Access Limited, by The Ontario Securities Commission v John O. McCutcheon, David K Lowry, John Craig, Fred W Gibbs and Dickson Jarvis
- Citations: 1982 CanLII 1705 (SCC), [1982] 2 SCR 161
- Docket No.: 15299
- Prior history: APPEAL from a judgment of the Court of Appeal for Ontario (1978), 86 DLR (3d) 160, 19 OR (2d) 516, affirming a judgment of the Divisional Court (1977), 78 DLR (3d) 701, 16 OR (2d) 593, which reversed a decision of Henry J. in Weekly Court (1975), 65 DLR (3d) 577, 11 OR (2d) 249.
- Ruling: Appeal allowed. The three questions should be answered by the negative.

Court membership
- Chief Justice: Bora Laskin; Puisne Justices: Ronald Martland, Roland Ritchie, Brian Dickson, Jean Beetz, Willard Estey, William McIntyre, Julien Chouinard, Antonio Lamer

Reasons given
- Majority: Dickson J., joined by Laskin C.J. and Martland, Ritchie, McIntyre and Lamer JJ.
- Concur/dissent: Estey J., joined by Beetz and Chouinard JJ.

Multiple Access Ltd v McCutcheon is a leading constitutional decision of the Supreme Court of Canada on the resolution of overlapping federal and provincial laws under the doctrine of double aspect.

== Background ==
Multiple Access, a company incorporated under the Canada Corporations Act made an offer to acquire the broadcasting assets of Canadian Marconi Limited, which was accepted. Two shareholders of Multiple Access applied to the Ontario courts to have the Ontario Securities Commission commence an action against several directors and officers of the company for insider trading under the Ontario Securities Act.

In its defence, the company argued that the provisions of the provincial Act were inoperative under the paramountcy doctrine as it overlapped with insider trading provisions in the Canada Corporations Act.

== Lower courts ==
At first instance, Henry J in Weekly Court held the provincial provisions in question were valid and still in effect. He stated that when both a provincial and a federal statute have occupied a field, the test that gives rise to the doctrine of paramountcy is whether the two statutes can "live together and operate concurrently." The doctrine of paramountcy does not necessarily arise because an individual is subject to prohibition and penalty under both statutes at the same time.

The Divisional Court reversed. Morden J, speaking for the Court, held that the constitutional doctrine of paramountcy operates to invalidate provincial legislation if it duplicates valid federal legislation in such a way that the two provisions cannot live together and operate concurrently. If the federal and provincial provisions are virtually identical, are directed to achieving the same policy, and create the same rights and obligations, the duplication attracts the doctrine of paramountcy. On appeal, the Ontario Court of Appeal agreed with the Divisional Court ruling.

== Supreme Court ==
These issues were before the Supreme Court:

1. whether ss. 100.4 and 100.5 of the Canada Corporations Act are ultra vires Parliament in whole or in part;
2. whether ss. 113 and 114 of the Securities Act are ultra vires the Legislature of Ontario in whole or in part, and
3. if both are intra vires, whether ss. 113 and 114 of the Ontario Act are suspended and inoperative by reason of the doctrine of paramountcy.

Dickson J, for the majority, held that both Acts were valid, and the doctrine of paramountcy did not apply.

Dickson first considered the nature of provisions relating to insider trading, and found that they could fall under either securities law or company law. As that could then fall under either federal or provincial jurisdiction, he noted:

There is, of course, no constitutional difficulty in this. The constitutional difficulty arises, however, when a statute may be characterized, as often happens, as coming within a federal as well as a provincial head of power. “To put the same point in another way, our community life — social, economic, political, and cultural — is very complex and will not fit neatly into any scheme of categories or classes without considerable overlap and ambiguity occurring. There are inevitable difficulties arising from this that we must live with so long as we have a federal constitution”

Dickson examined the Securities Act using the Lederman approach of judicial review, which states:

But if the contrast between the relative importance of the two features is not so sharp, what then? Here we come upon the double-aspect theory of interpretation, which constitutes the second way in which the courts have dealt with inevitably overlapping categories. When the court considers that the federal and provincial features of the challenged rule are of roughly equivalent importance so that neither should be ignored respecting the division of legislative powers, the decision is made that the challenged rule could be enacted by either the federal Parliament or provincial legislature. In the language of the Privy Council, “subjects which in one aspect and for one purpose fall within sect. 92, may in another aspect and for another purpose fall within sect. 91”.

He found that the Act was valid under the provincial authority over matters of property and civil rights under section 92(13) of the Constitution Act, 1867. He then considered the federal Act, which he found to be valid under the federal powers relating to trade and commerce as well as peace, order and good government.

Dickson then considered whether there was a conflict between the two Acts. He found that there was no conflict. The laws duplicated each other and had the same legislative objective. There is no problem with laws operating concurrently, Dickson argued. Mere duplication without actual conflict or contradiction is not sufficient to invoke the doctrine of paramountcy and render otherwise valid provincial legislation inoperative. Instead, there must be an actual conflict between the laws where compliance with one law will necessarily violate the other. However, any claimant seeking action under the Securities Act will be able to successfully use only one.

== See also ==
- List of Supreme Court of Canada cases (Laskin Court)
