= Ward v Canada (AG) =

- Supreme Court of Canada

Hearing: October 31, 2001 Judgment: February 22, 2002
- Full case name: Her Majesty The Queen v Ford Ward
- Citations: 2002 SCC 17, [2002] 1 S.C.R. 569
- Ruling: Crown appeal allowed

Court membership
- Chief Justice: Beverley McLachlin; Puisne Justices: Claire L'Heureux-Dubé, Charles Gonthier, Frank Iacobucci, John C. Major, Michel Bastarache, Ian Binnie, Louise Arbour, Louis LeBel

Reasons given
- Unanimous reasons by: McLachlin J.

Ward v Canada (AG) [2002] 1 S.C.R. 569, 2002 SCC 17 is a leading Supreme Court of Canada decision on federalism. The Court re-articulated the pith and substance analysis and upheld the regulations prohibiting sale of "blueback" seals for the valid purpose of "curtailing commercial hunting of young seals to preserve the fisheries as an economic resource".

== Background ==
Ford Ward was a licensed fisherman from Newfoundland. He also held a commercial seal hunting license. During a hunt in 1996 he caught approximately 50 seals some of which were hooded "blueback" seals. He was charged with selling blueback seal pelts contrary to s. 27 of the Marine Mammal Regulations.

Ward applied to the Newfoundland superior court to have the regulation declared ultra vires of the federal government.

The issue before the Supreme Court was "whether the federal regulation prohibiting the sale, trade or barter of blueback seals is a valid exercise of the federal fisheries power or the federal criminal law power".

== Opinion of the Court ==
McLachlin, writing for the majority, held that the law was a valid Act of the Parliament of Canada.

Her analysis began by examining the pith and substance of the law. She divided it into two steps. First, the court must determine the "essential character of the law", and second, whether "that character relates to an enumerated head of power" under the Constitution Act, 1867.

On the first step she consolidates all of the principles from the previous case law on the matter.

What is the true meaning or dominant feature of the impugned legislation? This is resolved by looking at the purpose and the legal effect of the regulation or law... The purpose refers to what the legislature wanted to accomplish. ... The legal effect refers to how the law will affect rights and liabilities, and is also helpful in illuminating the core meaning of the law. The effects can also reveal whether a law is "colourable", i.e. does the law in form appear to address something within the legislature's jurisdiction, but in substance deal with a matter outside that jurisdiction.

McLachlin says that the court must look at the wording of the Act as well as the circumstances that it was enacted.

On the facts of the case the purpose of the regulation was

to regulate the seal fishery by eliminating the commercial hunting of whitecoats and bluebacks through a prohibition on the sale, while at the same time allowing for a limited harvesting of these animals for non-commercial purposes. Stated another way, the "mischief" that Parliament sought to remedy was the large-scale commercial hunting of whitecoats and bluebacks. This was done to preserve the economic viability of not only the seal fishery, but the Canadian fisheries in general."

Consequently, the "pith and substance' of the law was found to be in relation to the "management of the Canadian fishery" which McLachlin found would fall within the federal fisheries power under section 91(12) of the Constitution Act, 1867.
