= Marine Mammal Regulations =

Marine Mammal Regulations (MMR) is a set of rules that govern the taking (fishing, hunting) and treatment of marine mammals in Canada. The regulations are part of the Fisheries Act.

The Marine Mammal Regulations s are divided into nine "parts":

- Part I - General
- Part II - Cetaceans
- Part III - Walrus
- Part IV - Seals

== History ==
The "Seal Protection Regulations" were established under the Fisheries Act by the Government of Canada in the mid-1960s. The regulations were combined with other Canadian marine mammals regulations in 1993, into the "Marine Mammal Regulations".

A proposed amendment in 2012 would have required boats to stay at least 50 meters away from belugas in Churchill and Seal River, 400 meters away from threatened or endangered cetaceans (including belugas) in parts of the St. Lawrence, 200 meters from cetaceans in other parts of the St. Lawrence, 100 meters away from cetaceans in other Canadian waters, and 100–300 meters from walruses, though Canada did not expect to add spending for enforcement. The proposal was still pending in 2015, supported by some environmental groups for western orcas, and opposed by tour operators for Churchill and Seal River belugas, because of different situations in the two areas.

== See also ==
- Ward v. Canada (Attorney General)
