= Canadian Western Bank v Alberta =

- Supreme Court of Canada

Hearing: April 11, 2006 Judgment: May 31, 2007
- Full case name: Canadian Western Bank, Bank of Montreal, Canadian Imperial Bank of Commerce, HSBC Bank Canada, National Bank of Canada, Royal Bank of Canada, Bank of Nova Scotia and Toronto‑Dominion Bank v. Her Majesty The Queen in Right of Alberta
- Citations: 2007 SCC 22, [2007] 2 S.C.R. 3
- Docket No.: 30823
- Prior history: Judgment for the Crown in the Court of Appeal for Alberta.
- Ruling: Appeal dismissed.

Holding
- If the pith and substance of the legislation falls under that legislative branch's legislative powers, then incidental effects outside of that dominant purpose does not affect the legislation's constitutionality. The fact that Parliament allows a federally regulated institution to do business that is regulated by the province does not mean that the institution is immune from the provincial regulation over that business.

Court membership
- Chief Justice: Beverley McLachlin; Puisne Justices: Michel Bastarache, Ian Binnie, Louis LeBel, Marie Deschamps, Morris Fish, Rosalie Abella, Louise Charron, Marshall Rothstein

Reasons given
- Majority: Binnie and LeBel JJ. (paras. 1-110), joined by McLachlin C.J. and Fish, Abella and Charron JJ.
- Concurrence: Bastarache J. (paras. 111-129)
- Deschamps and Rothstein JJ. took no part in the consideration or decision of the case.

Canadian Western Bank v Alberta [2007] 2 S.C.R. 3, 2007 SCC 22 is a landmark decision in Canadian constitutional law by the Supreme Court of Canada (SCC) relating to the division of powers between Federal and Provincial legislative bodies.

== Background ==
In 2000, Alberta enacted changes to its Insurance Act purporting to make federally chartered banks subject to the provincial licensing scheme governing the promotion of insurance products. Upon the coming into force of that Act, Canadian Western Bank, together with other chartered banks, brought an application for a declaration:

- that their promotion of certain insurance products authorized by the Bank Act was banking within the meaning of s. 91(15) of the Constitution Act, 1867, and
- that the Insurance Act and its associated regulations were constitutionally inapplicable to the banks' promotion of insurance by virtue of the doctrine of interjurisdictional immunity

or, alternatively, inoperative by virtue of the doctrine of federal paramountcy.

The trial court dismissed the bank application and said:

- the Insurance Act is a valid exercise of provincial powers under §92(13),
- interjurisdictional immunity also fails because insurance is not "at the core" of banking, and
- federal paramountcy does not apply because there is no operational conflict between federal and provincial law.

The appeal court reaffirmed the trial court decision.

== Decision ==
The Supreme Court reaffirmed the appeal court.

The Insurance Act and its associated regulations apply to the banks' promotion of insurance. The fact that Parliament allows a bank to enter into a provincially regulated line of business such as insurance cannot, by federal statute, unilaterally broaden the scope of an exclusive federal legislative power granted by the Constitution Act, 1867.

=== Assessing constitutionality of legislation ===
It was emphasized by the Court that all constitutional legal challenges to legislation should follow the same approach:

1. the pith and substance of the provincial law and the federal law should be examined to ensure that they are both validly enacted laws and to determine the nature of the overlap, if any, between them.
2. the applicability of the provincial law to the federal undertaking or matter in question must be resolved with reference to the doctrine of interjurisdictional immunity.
3. only if both the provincial law and the federal law have been found to be valid pieces of legislation, and only if the provincial law is found to be applicable to the federal matter in question, then both statutes must be compared to determine whether the overlap between them constitutes a conflict sufficient to trigger the application of the doctrine of federal paramountcy.

=== Pith and substance ===
If the constitutionality of legislation is being questioned in relation to the division of powers under the Constitution Act, 1867, an analysis of its pith and substance must be undertaken. There is an inquiry into the true nature of the law in question for the purpose of identifying the matter to which it essentially relates.

- If its pith and substance can be related to a matter that falls within the jurisdiction of the legislature that enacted it, the courts will declare it intra vires.
- If, however, it can more properly be said to relate to a matter that is outside the jurisdiction of that legislature, it will be held to be invalid owing to this violation of the division of powers.
- The corollary to this analysis is that legislation whose pith and substance falls within the jurisdiction of the legislature that enacted it may, at least to a certain extent, affect matters beyond the legislature's jurisdiction without necessarily being unconstitutional. The dominant purpose of the legislation is still decisive.
- Merely incidental effects will not disturb the constitutionality of an otherwise intra vires law.

The pith and substance doctrine is founded on the recognition that it is in practice impossible for a legislature to exercise its jurisdiction over a matter effectively without incidentally affecting matters within the jurisdiction of another level of government.

Also, some matters are by their very nature impossible to categorize under a single head of power: they may have both provincial and federal aspects. The double aspect doctrine, which applies in the course of a pith and substance analysis, ensures that the policies of the elected legislators of both levels of government are respected. The double aspect doctrine recognizes that both Parliament and the provincial legislatures can adopt valid legislation on a single subject depending on the perspective from which the legislation is considered, that is, depending on the various aspects of the matter in question.

In certain circumstances, however, the powers of one level of government must be protected against intrusions, even incidental ones, by the other level. The courts have developed the doctrines of interjurisdictional immunity and federal paramountcy.

=== Interjurisdictional immunity ===
The doctrine of interjurisdictional immunity recognizes that the Canadian Constitution is based on an allocation of exclusive powers to both levels of government, not concurrent powers, but the powers are bound to interact. It is a doctrine of limited application that should be restricted to its proper limit.

Interjurisdictional immunity should in general be reserved for situations already covered by precedent. In practice, it is largely reserved for heads of power that deal with federal things, persons, or undertakings, or if, in the past, its application has been considered absolutely indispensable or necessary to achieve the purpose for which exclusive legislative jurisdiction was conferred, as discerned from the constitutional division of powers as a whole, or what is absolutely indispensable or necessary to enable an undertaking to carry out its mandate in what makes it specifically of one jurisdiction or the other.

While in theory, a consideration of interjurisdictional immunity is apt for consideration after the pith and substance analysis, in practice, the absence of prior case law favouring its application to the subject matter at hand will generally justify a court proceeding directly to the consideration of federal paramountcy.

Even if the doctrine of interjurisdictional immunity is properly available, the level of the intrusion on the core of the power of the other level of government must be considered. To trigger the application of the immunity, it is not enough for the provincial legislation simply to affect that which makes a federal subject or object of rights specifically of federal jurisdiction. The difference between "affects" and "impairs" is that the former does not imply any adverse consequence whereas the latter does. In the absence of impairment, interjurisdictional immunity does not apply. It is only if the adverse impact of a law adopted by one level of government increases in severity from affecting to impairing that the core competence of the other level of government or the vital or essential part of an undertaking it duly constitutes is placed in jeopardy.

=== Federal paramountcy ===
According to the doctrine of federal paramountcy, if the operational effects of provincial legislation are incompatible with federal legislation, the federal legislation must prevail and the provincial legislation is rendered inoperative to the extent of the incompatibility. The doctrine applies not only to cases in which the provincial legislature has legislated pursuant to its ancillary power to trench on an area of federal jurisdiction, but also to situations in which the provincial legislature acts within its primary powers, and Parliament pursuant to its ancillary powers. To trigger the application of the doctrine, the onus is on the party relying on the doctrine of federal paramountcy to demonstrate that the federal and provincial laws are in fact incompatible by establishing either that it is impossible to comply with both laws or that to apply the provincial law would frustrate the purpose of the federal law.

== See also ==
- List of Supreme Court of Canada cases (McLachlin Court)
- Canadian constitutional law
- Canadian federalism
