= Canada (Minister of Justice) v Borowski =

Minister of Justice (Can) v Borowski
- Supreme Court of Canada

Hearing: 27–28 May 1981 Judgment: 1 December 1981
- Full case name: The Minister of Justice of Canada and the Minister of Finance of Canada v Joseph Borowski
- Citations: [1981] 2 SCR 575
- Prior history: APPEAL from Borowski v. Minister of Justice of Canada and Minister of Finance of Canada, 1980 CanLII 2279 (5 November 1980)
- Ruling: Appeal dismissed

Court membership
- Chief Justice: Bora Laskin; Puisne Justices: Ronald Martland, Roland Ritchie, Brian Dickson, Jean Beetz, Willard Estey, William McIntyre, Julien Chouinard, Antonio Lamer

Reasons given
- Majority: Martland J, joined by Ritchie, Dickson, Beetz, Estey, McIntyre and Chouinard JJ
- Dissent: Laskin CJ, joined by Lamer J

Canada (Minister of Justice) v Borowski, [1981] 2 S.C.R. 575 is a landmark Supreme Court of Canada decision on the standard for allowing public interests to gain standing to challenge a law. The Court developed what is known as the Borowski test for public interest standing.

== Background ==
Joseph Borowski was a prominent anti-abortion activist in Saskatchewan who wanted to challenge the abortion provisions under section 251(4), (5), and (6) of the Criminal Code as violations to right to life in the Canadian Bill of Rights.

In a seven to two decision the Court found that Borowski had standing to challenge the law.

== Reasons of the court ==
Justice Martland, wrote the decision for the majority. Martland's reasoning was largely based on the previous decision of Thorson v. Attorney General of Canada, [1975] 1 S.C.R. 138. He stated that a plaintiff seeking a declaration to invalidate a law must show that they are directly affected by it, or have a genuine interest as a citizen and there be no reasonable and effective alternative means to challenge the law.

Borowski was found to meet this requirement as it would be difficult to bring such an issue to court without having an interest group make a challenge.

== Commentary ==
The test was later re-articulated more narrowly in the decision of Canadian Council of Churches v. Canada (Minister of Employment and Immigration), [1992] 1 S.C.R. 236.

== See also ==
- List of Supreme Court of Canada cases (Laskin Court)
- Borowski v. Canada (Attorney General), [1989]
