= Quebec (AG) v Canadian Owners and Pilots Assn =

2010 ruling of the Supreme Court of Canada (2010 SCC 39)

- Supreme Court of Canada

Hearing: October 14, 2009 Judgment: October 15, 2010
- Full case name: Attorney General of Quebec v Canadian Owners and Pilots Association
- Citations: 2010 SCC 39 (CanLII), [2010] 2 SCR 536
- Docket No.: 32604
- Prior history: Appealed from Laferrière c. Québec (Procureur général), 2008 QCCA 427 (CanLII), 48 M.P.L.R. (4th) 26, [2008] Q.J. No. 1597 (QL), 2008 CarswellQue 14277, reversing a decision of the Superior Court, Laferrière c. Lortie 2006 QCCS 3377 (CanLII), [2006] J.Q. no 5998 (QL), 2006 CarswellQue 5622, upholding a decision of the Court of Québec, Laferrière c. Québec (Commission de protection du territoire agricole) 2002 CanLII 41590 (QC CQ), [2002] J.Q. no 4771 (QL).

Court membership
- Chief Justice: Beverley McLachlin; Puisne Justices: Ian Binnie, Louis LeBel, Marie Deschamps, Morris Fish, Rosalie Abella, Louise Charron, Marshall Rothstein, Thomas Cromwell

Reasons given
- Majority: McLachlin C.J.
- Dissent: Deschamps J., joined by LeBel J.

Quebec (Attorney General) v. Canadian Owners and Pilots Association, 2010 SCC 39, [2010] 2 SCR 536, also referred to as Quebec v. COPA, is a leading case of the Supreme Court of Canada on determining the applicability of the doctrines of interjurisdictional immunity and federal paramountcy in Canadian constitutional law.

== The facts ==
An aerodrome, registered under the federal Aeronautics Act, was constructed on land zoned as agricultural in the province of Quebec. Section 26 of the Quebec Act respecting the preservation of agricultural land and agricultural activities (“ARPALAA”) prohibited the use of lots in a designated agricultural region for any purpose other than agriculture, subject to prior authorization by the Commission de protection du territoire agricole du Québec.

Since the Commission’s permission was not obtained prior to constructing the aerodrome, the Commission ordered the return of the land to its original state pursuant to the ARPALAA. The Commission’s decision was challenged on the ground that aeronautics is within federal jurisdiction.

== The courts below ==
The Administrative Tribunal of Quebec, the Court of Quebec and the Superior Court of Quebec all upheld the Commission's decision, but the Quebec Court of Appeal found that interjurisdictional immunity precluded the Commission from ordering the dismantling of the aerodrome.

== Decision of the Supreme Court of Canada ==
The appeal was dismissed. Interjurisdictional immunity was held to apply in the matter, under a two-part test that was stated by McLachlin CJ:

[27] The first step is to determine whether the provincial law ... trenches on the protected “core” of a federal competence. If it does, the second step is to determine whether the provincial law’s effect on the exercise of the protected federal power is sufficiently serious to invoke the doctrine of interjurisdictional immunity.

While ARPALAA is valid provincial legislation, it is inapplicable to the extent that it impacts the federal power over aeronautics. The federal aeronautics jurisdiction encompasses not only the regulation of the operation of aircraft and airports, but also the power to determine the location of airports and aerodromes. This power is an essential and indivisible part of aeronautics and, as such, lies within the protected core of the federal aeronautics power.

In prohibiting the building of aerodromes on designated agricultural land unless prior authorization has been obtained from the Commission, the ARPALAA effectively removed the total area of the designated agricultural regions from the territory that Parliament may designate for aeronautical uses. This is not an insignificant amount of land, and much of it is strategically located.

- Although s. 26 does not sterilize Parliament’s power to legislate on aeronautics — the doctrine of paramountcy would permit Parliament to legislatively override provincial zoning legislation for the purpose of establishing aerodromes —, it nevertheless seriously affected the manner in which the power can be exercised.
- If s. 26 applied, it would force the federal Parliament to choose between accepting that the province can forbid the placement of aerodromes on the one hand, or specifically legislating to override the provincial law on the other hand. This would seriously impair the federal power over aviation, effectively forcing the federal Parliament to adopt a different and more burdensome scheme for establishing aerodromes than it has in fact chosen to do.

In the appeal, it had been argued by Quebec that interjurisdictional immunity did not apply where a law raises a double aspect. Although it was not necessary to decide that question, it was stated that the argument misapprehended the doctrine of interjurisdictional immunity:

The interjurisdictional immunity analysis presumes the validity of a law and focuses exclusively on the law’s effects on the core of a federal power.... What matters, from the perspective of interjurisdictional immunity, is that the law has the effect of impairing the core of a federal competency. In those cases where the doctrine applies, it serves to protect the immunized core of federal power from any provincial impairment.

The doctrine of federal paramountcy would not apply in this case.

- Paramountcy may flow either from the impossibility of complying with both federal and provincial laws or from the frustration of a federal purpose. Here, there was no operational conflict, since the federal legislation did not require the construction of an aerodrome and it is possible to comply with both the provincial and federal legislation by demolishing the aerodrome.
- There was also no evidence establishing that a federal purpose regarding the location of aerodromes was frustrated by the provincial legislation. The federal regulations provide that the Minister responsible may determine that the location of each registered aerodrome is in the public interest, but they do not disclose any federal purpose with respect to the location of aerodromes.

=== Dissent ===
Deschamps J declared that the only difference between the present case and Quebec (Attorney General) v. Lacombe (which was released on the same day) was that Lacombe was concerned with municipal zoning and COPA with a provincial agricultural zoning scheme. She concluded that there was no evidence of an incidental effect that would amount to an impairment of the core of the federal aeronautics power.

== Impact ==
This case, together with the concurrent case of Lacombe, has further added to the Court's jurisprudence on Canadian federalism in a significant manner. There has been discussion as to the consistency of these rulings in comparison to previous jurisprudence, but the Court's tests for paramountcy and interjurisdictional immunity in COPA have been cited in subsequent constitutional jurisprudence, especially in:

- Canada (Attorney General) v. PHS Community Services Society, 2011 SCC 44, [2011] 3 SCR 134 (30 September 2011)
- Quebec (Attorney General) v. Canada (Human Resources and Social Development), 2011 SCC 60, [2011] 3 SCR 635 (8 December 2011)
- Marine Services International Ltd. v. Ryan Estate, 2013 SCC 44 (2 August 2013)

== See also ==
- Quebec (Attorney General) v. Lacombe
- Neuville Airport
