= Fairfax v Commissioner of Taxation =

Judgement of the High Court of Australia

- Court: High Court of Australia
- Full case name: Fairfax v Federal Commissioner of Taxation
- Decided: 2 December 1965
- Citations: [1965] HCA 64, (1965) 114 CLR 1

Court membership
- Judges sitting: Barwick CJ, Kitto, Taylor, Menzies and Windeyer JJ

Case opinions
- (5:0) Section 11 of the Income Tax and Social Services Contribution Assessment Act 1961 is valid under the taxation power (per Barwick CJ, Kitto, Taylor, Menzies and Windeyer JJ)

Fairfax v Commissioner of Taxation is a High Court of Australia case that considered the scope of the taxation power in section 51(ii) of the Constitution.

== Facts ==
The Income Tax and Social Services Contribution Assessment Act 1964, dealt with income tax and social services. Section 11 of the Act exempted certain superannuation funds from income tax if they invested in government securities. Fairfax was subject to the tax but challenged it by arguing it was a law with respect to superannuation funds, not an exercise of the taxation power.

== Decision ==
Per Kitto J:

The Commonwealth law was in substance a law with respect to taxation. A tax does not cease to be valid because it regulates, discourages, or even definitely deters the activities taxed.

The plaintiffs argued that if superannuation funds fully undertook the law, and invested in government securities, then the Section 11 provision would result in no taxation revenue for the government. The Court however thought the issue of raising revenue was a secondary concern. The law was still concerned with taxation because it imposed a taxation obligation. The fact that the purpose was to deter superannuation funds, did not preclude it from being a matter with respect to taxation. As s51(ii) was a non-purposive head of power, like all such powers, it operates on the subject matter.

== See also ==
- Constitutional basis of taxation in Australia
- Australian constitutional law
