= Canadian Council of Churches v Canada (Minister of Employment and Immigration) =

- Supreme Court of Canada

Hearing: October 11, 1991 Judgment: January 23, 1992
- Full case name: The Canadian Council of Churches v. Her Majesty The Queen and The Minister of Employment and Immigration
- Citations: [1992] 1 S.C.R. 236
- Docket No.: 21946
- Prior history: Partial judgment for the Crown and the Minister of Employment and Immigration in the Federal Court of Appeal.
- Ruling: Appeal dismissed; cross-appeal allowed.

Holding
- There are three requirements to decide when there is public interest to grant a party status to file an application to strike down legislation as unconstitutional: (1) Is there a serious issues raised as to the invalidity of the legislation in question? (2) Is the party directly affected by the legislation or, if not, does the plaintiff have a genuine interest in its validity? (3) Is there another reasonable and effective way to bring the issue to the court? If a potential private litigant has the ability to make the application, then the third criterion is not met.

Court membership
- Chief Justice: Antonio Lamer; Puisne Justices: Gérard La Forest, Claire L'Heureux-Dubé, John Sopinka, Charles Gonthier, Peter Cory, Beverley McLachlin, William Stevenson, Frank Iacobucci

Reasons given
- Unanimous reasons by: Cory J.
- Lamer C.J. and McLachlin J. took no part in the consideration or decision of the case.

Canadian Council of Churches v Canada (Minister of Employment and Immigration), [1992] 1 S.C.R. 236, is a leading Supreme Court of Canada case on the law of standing in Canada. In particular, the case sets out the criteria a public-interest group must meet in order to be allowed to mount a constitutional challenge in court.

== Background ==
Prior to this case standing for public-interest litigants was governed by the "Borowski test," which was given broad application. During the hearings for Thorson and Borowski Justice Martland and Chief Justice Laskin were fiercely at odds over the issue on interpreting the standard. Laskin felt that the Borowski test allowed in people who merely wanted to challenge law for political reasons and not because they were truly affected, while Martland felt the test followed the original principles in Thorson v. Attorney General of Canada.

The Canadian Council of Churches is an incorporated interest group that represents the interests of a number of churches. The group's focus had been the current government policy on refugee protection and resettlement. In particular, they had been critical of the changes in the determination process of evaluating whether a refugee came within the definition of Convention Refugee as part of recent amendments to the Immigration Act, 1976.

The Council sought a judicial declaration that the amendments were unconstitutional, and therefore of no force or effect. The Attorney General of Canada moved to strike out the claim on the basis that the Council did not have standing to bring the action. At first instance, it was held that the Council had standing, but this was overturned on appeal. The issue before the Supreme Court of Canada was whether the Council has standing to challenge the validity of the amendments. The Court found that the Council did not have standing, and dismissed the appeal.

== Opinion of the Court ==
The Court acknowledged the need for public-interest standing in principle, to ensure that government is not immunized from constitutional challenges to legislation. However, the Court also stressed the need to strike a balance between ensuring access to the courts and preserving judicial resources, citing the concern of an "unnecessary proliferation of marginal or redundant suits brought by well-meaning organizations pursuing their own particular cases certain in the knowledge that their cause is all important."

The current test for standing, as summarized in this decision, considers three factors:

1. is there a serious issue raised as to the invalidity of legislation in question?
2. has it been established that the plaintiff is directly affected by the legislation or, if not, does the plaintiff have a genuine interest in its validity?
3. is there another reasonable and effective way to bring the issue before the Court?

On the facts of the case the Court found that the claim did raise some serious questions. Moreover, the claimant had a "genuine interest" in its validity. However, the claim must fail on the third and most onerous factor. Since a refugee would have standing to challenge the law, there would clearly be a reasonable and effective way to bring the issue to the Court. The Court dismissed the argument that refugees did not have effective access to the courts to bring a claim. Evidence showed that many are capable of making claims, which, in all, were better ways to challenge a law as there are concrete facts behind it. The Court further dismissed the claim that the potential imposition of a removal order would bar them from challenging it, as the Federal Court could grant an injunction to prevent deportation.
