= Interjurisdictional immunity =

Canadian legal doctrine

In Canadian Constitutional law, interjurisdictional immunity is the legal doctrine that determines which legislation arising from one level of jurisdiction may be applicable to matters covered at another level. Interjurisdictional immunity is an exception to the pith and substance doctrine, as it stipulates that there is a core to each federal subject matter that cannot be reached by provincial laws. While a provincial law that imposes a tax on banks may be ruled intra vires, as it is not within the protected core of banking, a provincial law that limits the rights of creditors to enforce their debts would strike at such a core and be ruled inapplicable.

The paramountcy doctrine proves that if a valid federal law and a valid provincial law conflict, the federal legislation is paramount, prevails and renders the provincial legislation inoperative to the extent of the conflict. The principal test for determining whether there is a conflict between the two laws is whether the provincial law "frustrates the purpose" of the federal law. In contrast, the interjurisdictional immunity doctrine is activated even if there is no meeting of legislation or contradiction between federal and provincial statutes. It requires only for the provincial legislation to impact federal things, persons or undertakings significantly. The doctrine renders inapplicable legislation of general application which affects the rights and obligations, impacts the status, or regulates the essential parts of:

- things,
- persons, or
- undertakings,

exclusively within the core of the jurisdiction of the other order of government.

== Early cases ==
The doctrine was first formulated to deal with the effects that provincial laws could have on federally incorporated companies.

- In John Deere v Wharton, provincial laws prohibiting companies not incorporated under the law of the enacting province from carrying on business without a prescribed licence were held not to apply to federally incorporated companies.
- In Great West Saddlery v The King, an Ontario law prohibiting all companies from acquiring or holding land without a provincial license did not impair the status or essential powers of the federal companies that operated within the province.

== Expansion of doctrine ==
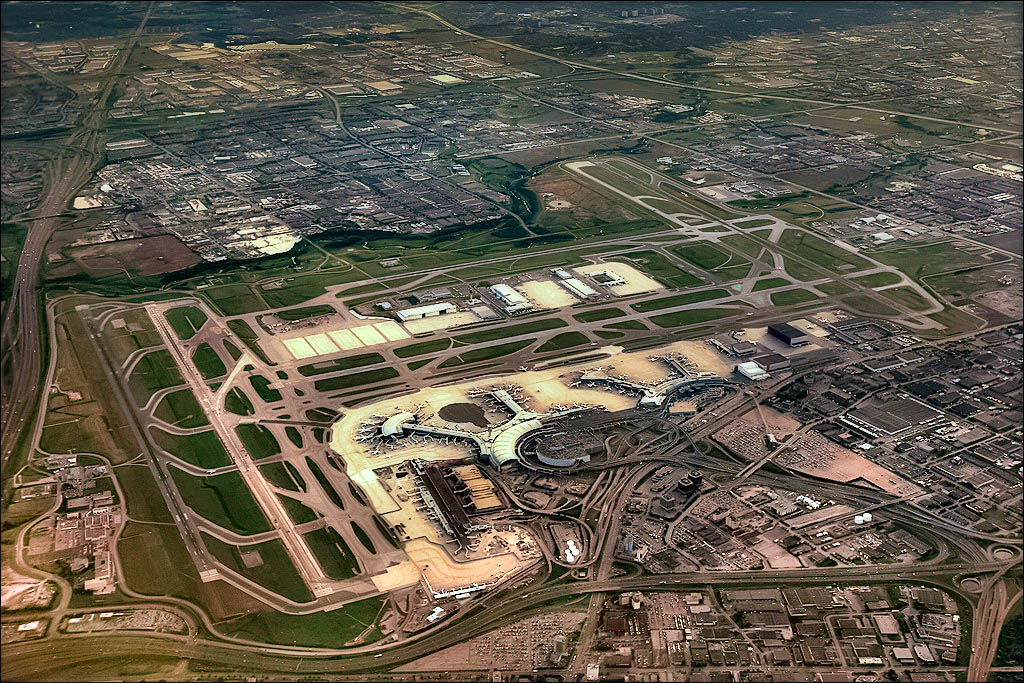
GTAA v. Mississauga held that interjurisdictional immunity protected Toronto Pearson International Airport from municipal development fees, due to federal jurisdiction over aeronautics.

Until 1966, undertakings which came within federal jurisdiction were held to be immune from otherwise valid provincial laws only if the laws had the effect of sterilizing, paralyzing or impairing the federally authorized activity. However, the scope of the doctrine was expanded in Bell Canada (1966), where a provincial law prescribing a minimum wage was held not to apply in 1966 when it was determined that a valid law could not apply, as such a law "affects a vital part of the management and operation of the undertaking". It did not matter that no sterilization, paralysis or impairment had occurred.

This doctrine was affirmed in 1988 when the Supreme Court of Canada ruled in three cases that provincial occupational health and safety laws were held to be inapplicable to three federal undertakings engaged in interprovincial transportation and communication. In Bell Canada v Quebec (1988), Beetz J declared:

254. ...the management of these undertakings and their labour relations are matters which are part of this basic and unassailable minimum, as these matters are essential and vital elements of any undertaking. How is it possible to disagree with this? How can the exclusive power to regulate these undertakings not include at least the exclusive power to make laws relating to their management? Additionally, just as the management of the undertaking and working conditions determined by agreement or by operation of law are parts of the same whole in labour law, how can the exclusive power to legislate as to management of an undertaking not include the equally exclusive power to make laws regarding its labour relations? To deny this, as the critics have done, is to strip the exclusive federal power of its primary content and transform it simply into a power to make ancillary laws connected to a primary power with no real independent content, apart from the power to regulate rates and the availability and quality of services such as telephone services or railway services. The latter undoubtedly fall within the exclusive classes of subject represented by such federal undertakings, but there is nothing in the constitutional provisions, rules or precedents to indicate that the exclusive legislative authority of Parliament must or may be confined to so narrow a field. Indeed, rates and the availability and quality of services are inseparable from the wage scale that the undertaking must pay, the availability of its manpower, leave, vacation—in short, working conditions.

The doctrine was modified in Irwin Toy to specify that:

- the "affecting a vital part" test only applied to provincial laws that were intended to apply directly to a federal undertaking, but
- where a provincial law had only an indirect effect, it would not be inapplicable unless it impaired a vital part of that undertaking.

== Current jurisprudence ==
In response to this more classical approach to settling matters of constitutional law, the necessary degree of infringement was revisited in Canadian Western Bank in 2007, where the Supreme Court of Canada ruled that, in the absence of outright impairment of the "vital or essential part", interjurisdictional immunity would not apply. This was subsequently affirmed in Lafarge.

Therefore, in order to render statutes inapplicable, the impacts that engage the interjurisdictional immunity doctrine must be significant. The requirement is that legislation significantly embrace things, undertakings or persons exclusively in the jurisdiction of the other order of government. The interjurisdictional immunity doctrine will not render inapplicable insignificant impacts caused by legislation of general application.

Additionally, though the doctrine was textually justified in Canadian Western Bank, the court also expressed a preference for relying on the doctrine of federal paramountcy over interjurisdictional immunity when attempting to resolve federalism disputes (after the impugned legislation had been found valid):

77 ... we do not think it appropriate to always begin by considering the doctrine of interjurisdictional immunity. To do so could mire the Court in a rather abstract discussion of "cores" and "vital and essential" parts to little practical effect. As we have already noted, interjurisdictional immunity is of limited application and should in general be reserved for situations already covered by precedent. This means, in practice, that it will be largely reserved for those heads of power that deal with federal things, persons or undertakings, or where in the past its application has been considered absolutely indispensable or necessary to enable Parliament or a provincial legislature to achieve the purpose for which exclusive legislative jurisdiction was conferred, as discerned from the constitutional division of powers as a whole, or what is absolutely indispensable or necessary to enable an undertaking to carry out its mandate in what makes it specifically of federal (or provincial) jurisdiction. If a case can be resolved by the application of a pith and substance analysis, and federal paramountcy where necessary, it would be preferable to take that approach...

While most jurisprudence has revolved around the applicability of provincial laws on undertakings under federal jurisdiction, one must not ignore its relevance with respect to things and persons. For example:

- in the matter of Canadian maritime law, provincial laws relating to damages, negligence and apportionment have been held not to apply to fill in any gaps that may exist, as maritime law is at the core of the federal power over "Navigation and Shipping".
- certain provincial laws regulating hunting have been held not to apply to Indians where they significantly interfere with treaty rights, as such rights have been held to be at the core of the federal power over "Indians and Indian lands".

In Quebec (Attorney General) v. Canadian Owners and Pilots Association ("COPA"), McLachlin CJ outlined a two-step test that must be undertaken to determine if interjurisdictional immunity comes into play:

1. Does the provincial law trench on the protected "core" of a federal competence?
2. Is the provincial law's effect on the exercise of the protected federal power sufficiently serious to invoke the doctrine of interjurisdictional immunity?

Though there remains some debate, it has generally been accepted that the doctrine applies to both the federal and provincial governments equally. Nevertheless, virtually all of the case law concerns situations where provincial laws encroach on federal matters. The Supreme Court has expressed caution in employing the doctrine in future cases because:

1. It is in tension with the dominant approach that permits concurrent federal and provincial legislation with respect to a matter.
2. It is in tension with the emergent practice of cooperative federalism.
3. It may overshoot the federal or provincial power in which it is grounded and create legislative "no go" zones where neither level of government regulates.

As McLachlin CJ explained in Canada (AG) v PHS Community Services Society:

[70] In summary, the doctrine of interjurisdictional immunity is narrow. Its premise of fixed watertight cores is in tension with the evolution of Canadian constitutional interpretation towards the more flexible concepts of double aspect and cooperative federalism. To apply it here would disturb settled competencies and introduce uncertainties for new ones. Quite simply, the doctrine is neither necessary nor helpful in the resolution of the contest here between the federal government and the provincial government.

== See also ==
- Intergovernmental immunity - US doctrine
- Intergovernmental immunity - Australian doctrine
