= Pith and substance =

Canadian legal principle

Pith and substance (Note: Originally the analysis was simply referred to as "in relation to".) is a legal doctrine in Canadian constitutional interpretation used to determine under which head of power a given piece of legislation falls. The doctrine is primarily used when a law is challenged on the basis that one level of government (be it provincial or federal) has encroached upon the exclusive jurisdiction of another level of government.

The Constitution Act, 1867, which established a federal constitution for Canada, enumerated in Sections 91 and 92 the topics on which the Dominion and the Provinces could respectively legislate. Notwithstanding that the lists were framed so as to be fairly full and comprehensive, soon it was found that the topics enumerated in the two sections overlapped, and the Privy Council repeatedly had to rule on the constitutionality of laws made by the federal and provincial legislatures. It was in this situation that the Privy Council evolved the doctrine that, for deciding whether an impugned legislation was intra vires (within its powers), regard must be had to its pith and substance.

Thus, if a statute is found in substance to relate to a topic within the competence of the legislature, it should be held to be intra vires even though it might incidentally trench on topics not within its legislative competence. The extent of the encroachment on matters beyond its competence may be an element in determining whether the legislation is colourable: whether in the guise of making a law on a matter within its competence, the legislature is, in truth, making a law on a subject beyond its competence. However, where that is not the position, the fact of encroachment does not affect the vires of the law even as regards the area of encroachment.

== Nature of pith and substance analysis ==
The analysis must answer two questions:

1. what is the pith and substance or essential character of the law?
2. does it relate to an enumerated head of power in section 91 or 92 of the Constitution Act, 1867?

=== Essential character ===
The first task in the pith and substance analysis is to determine the pith and substance or essential character of the law:

- What is the true meaning or dominant feature of the impugned legislation? This is resolved by looking at the purpose and the legal effect of the regulation or law. The purpose refers to what the legislature wanted to accomplish.
- Purpose is relevant to determine whether, in this case, Parliament was legislating within its jurisdiction, or venturing into an area under provincial jurisdiction.
- The legal effect refers to how the law will affect rights and liabilities, and is also helpful in illuminating the core meaning of the law: see Reference re Firearms Act. The effects can also reveal whether a law is colourable (does the law in form appear to address something within the legislature's jurisdiction, but in substance deal with a matter outside that jurisdiction?). For example, in R. v. Morgentaler (1993), the province of Nova Scotia passed a law that prohibited certain surgical procedures from being performed outside of hospitals under the guise of health services protection. The Supreme Court of Canada ruled that in substance, the province was attempting to ban abortions.

The pith and substance analysis is not technical or formalistic — it is essentially a matter of interpretation. The court looks at the words used in the impugned legislation as well as the background and circumstances surrounding its enactment. In conducting this analysis, the court should not be concerned with the efficacy of the law or whether it achieves the legislature’s goals.

=== Assignment ===
There are two significant principles to be used in determining whether a matter falls within a particular federal or provincial jurisdiction:

- The Constitution must be interpreted flexibly over time to meet new social, political and historic realities
- The principle of federalism must be respected, keeping in mind:

- Power is shared by two orders of government, each autonomous in developing policies and laws within their own jurisdiction
- Classes of subjects should be construed in relation to one another
- In cases where federal and provincial classes of subjects contemplate overlapping concepts, meaning may be given to both through the process of “mutual modification”
- Classes of subjects should not be construed so broadly as to expand jurisdiction indefinitely

Once the law has been characterized it must be assigned to one of the two heads of power. The matters in the exclusive domain of the federal government are enumerated under section 91 of the Constitution Act, 1867 and matters in the exclusive domain of the provincial government are enumerated under section 92. Whether the characterization of a law fits within one of the enumerated matters depends on the breadth given by the court to each matter.

A law found to be valid under the pith and substance analysis of the law may also have some incidental effects upon matters outside of the government's jurisdiction. This is tolerated, as a law is classified by its dominant characteristic. The modern approach to Canadian constitutional interpretation is to allow a fair amount of interplay and overlap into the other level of government's jurisdiction.

== Ancillary effects doctrine ==
In many circumstances, however, a law that is found to be invalid under the pith and substance analysis may still be saved by using the doctrine of necessarily incidental or ancillary effects. In such cases, the intruding provisions of the law will only be upheld if they satisfy the "rational connection" test.

The doctrine was first articulated in Cushing v. Dupuy, where the Judicial Committee of the Privy Council held that certain rules of civil court procedure could be prescribed under the federal bankruptcy power. It was subsequently confirmed in Tennant v. The Union Bank of Canada, where rules governing warehouse receipts with respect to bank loans could be prescribed under the federal banking power.

The full test was articulated in General Motors v. City National Leasing by Dickson CJ, where he summarized and outlined the analysis to be used in that regard in future cases:

- The court must determine whether the impugned provision can be viewed as intruding on provincial powers, and if so to what extent.
- It must establish whether the act (or a severable part of it) in which the impugned provision is found is valid.

- In cases under the second branch of s. 91(2) this will normally involve finding the presence of a regulatory scheme and then ascertaining whether the hallmarks articulated by the Court have been met by the scheme. If the scheme is not valid, that is the end of the inquiry.

- If the regulatory scheme is declared valid, the court must then determine whether the impugned provision is sufficiently integrated with the scheme that it can be upheld by virtue of that relationship. This requires considering the seriousness of the encroachment on provincial powers, in order to decide on the proper standard for such a relationship. If the provision passes this integration test, it is intra vires Parliament as an exercise of the general trade and commerce power. If the provision is not sufficiently integrated into the scheme of regulation, it cannot be sustained under the second branch of s. 91(2).

In certain cases, it may be possible to dispense with some of the aforementioned steps if a clear answer to one of them will deal with the issue. For example, if the provision in question has no relation to the regulatory scheme, the question of its validity may be quickly answered on that ground alone.

== Use outside of Canada ==
The pith and substance doctrine as applied in the jurisprudence of the Judicial Committee of the Privy Council, effectively the British imperial court of appeal, has been carried to other Commonwealth federations. It is used in the Indian constitution. It was also used in Northern Ireland under the Government of Ireland Act 1920. The substance of the doctrine has been cast in statutory form in the Scotland Act 1998 for the purpose of devolution to Scotland. It was also used in Australia until 1964, when the High Court case of Fairfax v Commissioner of Taxation overruled its use by an alternate method.

=== In India ===
It is used in the Indian constitution. The doctrine has been applied in India also to provide a degree of flexibility in the otherwise rigid scheme of distribution of powers. The reason for adoption of this doctrine is that if every legislation were to be declared invalid on the grounds that it encroached powers, the powers of the legislature would be drastically circumscribed. Cases relating to pith and substance:

- Central Bank Of India vs State Of Kerala & Ors on 27 February, 2009
- Ms Bharti Telemedia Limited vs Chief Secretory on 30 January, 2014
- State Of Maharashtra vs Bharat Shanti Lal Shah & Ors on 1 September, 2008
- The Gujarat University vs Krishna Ranganath Mudholkar And ... on 21 February, 1962
- Zameer Ahmed Latifur Rehman ... vs State Of Maharashtra & Ors on 23 April, 2010

Citation in the matter of M/s. Sky Gourmet Catering Private Limited V/s Tax Authorities (Commercial Tax and Service Tax) in the matter of Writ Appeal No. 671 to 726 of 2011 (T-Res) decided on 18th day of April, 2011 by Hon'ble High Court of Karnataka at Bangalore may also be seen.

== Significant cases ==
- Charles Cushing v Louis Dupuy [1880] UKPC 22, (1880) 5 AC 409 (15 April 1880), P.C. (on appeal from Quebec)
- The Citizens Insurance Company of Canada and The Queen Insurance Company v Parsons [1881] UKPC 49, [1881] 7 A.C. 96 (26 November 1881), P.C. (on appeal from Canada)
- Tennant v The Union Bank of Canada [1893] UKPC 53, [1894] AC 31 (9 December 1893), Privy Council (on appeal from Ontario)
- Attorney General of Ontario v Attorney General for the Dominion of Canada ("Assignments and Preferences Case") [1894] UKPC 13, [1894] AC 189 (24 February 1894), Privy Council (on appeal from Ontario)
- The Attorney General for Ontario v The Attorney General for the Dominion of Canada, and the Distillers and Brewers’ Association of Ontario [1896] UKPC 20, [1896] AC 348 (9 May 1896), P.C. (on appeal from Canada)
- Union Colliery Company of British Columbia, Limited and others v John Bryden [1899] UKPC 58, [1899] AC 580 (28 July 1899), P.C. (on appeal from British Columbia)
- The Attorney General of Canada v The Attorney General of Ontario and others ("Employment and Social Insurance Reference" [1937] UKPC 7, [1937] AC 355 (28 January 1937), P.C. (on appeal from Canada)
- Attorney General of Alberta v Attorney General of Canada [1938] UKPC 46, [1939] AC 117 (14 July 1938), P.C. (on appeal from Canada)
- The Board of trustees of the Lethbridge Irrigation District and another v. The independent Order of Foresters and the Attorney-General of Canada and another [1940] UKPC 8, [1940] AC 513 (4 March 1940), P.C. (on appeal from Alberta)
- General Motors of Canada Ltd. v. City National Leasing, 1989 CanLII 133, [1989] 1 SCR 641 (20 April 1989), Supreme Court (Canada)
- R. v. Morgentaler, 1993 CanLII 74, [1993] 3 SCR 463 (30 September 1993)
- Reference re Firearms Act (Can.), 2000 SCC 31, [2000] 1 SCR 783 (15 June 2000)
- Ward v. Canada (Attorney General), 2002 SCC 17, [2002] 1 SCR 569 (22 February 2002)
