= Double aspect doctrine =

Doctrine in Canadian constitutional law

The double aspect doctrine in Canadian constitutional law is one that allows for laws to be created by both provincial and federal governments in relation to the same subject matter. Typically, the federalist system assigns subject matters of legislation to a single head of power. However, certain matters have several dimensions to them, such that for one purpose the matter will fall to one head of power, while for another purpose, it will fall to the other. For example, highway traffic laws fall into the property and civil rights power of the province, but equally, can be a criminal offence which is in the criminal law power of the federal government.

The origin of the doctrine comes from the 1883 Privy Council decision of Hodge v. The Queen, where it was stated that "subjects which in one aspect and for one purpose fall within s. 92, may in another aspect and for another purpose fall within s. 91".

== Matters of the double aspect doctrine ==
The Courts have established several matters that are considered "double aspect" and can be legislated by either provincial or federal government. Those matters include:

- Entertainment in taverns
- Gaming
- Interest rates
- Insolvency
- Maintenance of spouses and child custody
- Securities regulations
- Temperance
