= List of judgements of the Judicial Committee of the Privy Council =

This is a list of major cases decided by the Judicial Committee of the Privy Council. These include appeals from the following countries:

- Canada (criminal cases until 1933; civil cases until 1949)
- Irish Free State (until 1933)
- India (until 1950)
- Pakistan (until 1950)
- South Africa (until 1950)
- Malaysia (until 1985)
- Australia (until 1986)
- Singapore (until 1994)
- Hong Kong (until 1997)
- New Zealand (until 2003)
- Most Commonwealth Caribbean countries.

== 1833–1899 ==
| Case name | Citation | Subject |
|---|---|---|
| Maher v. Town Council of Portland (New Brunswick, Canada) | (1875) | |
| Guibord Affair case (Quebec, Canada) | (1875) | |
| Citizen's Insurance Co. v. Parsons (Ontario, Canada) | (1880) | Trade and Commerce clause of Constitution |
| Russell v. The Queen (New Brunswick, Canada) | (1882) App. Cas. 829 | first peace, order and good government case |
| McLaren v. Caldwell (Ontario, Canada) | (1883) | re. powers Canadian government |
| Hodge v. the Queen | (1883) | double aspect doctrine of Constitution |
| The Trustees, Executor and Agency Co. v. Short | (1888) 58 L.J.P.C. 4 | |
| St. Catharines Milling & Lumber Co. v. The Queen (Canada) | (1888), 14 App. Cas. 46 | aboriginal rights |
1888 – suspension of criminal appeals from Canada
| Gibbs v. Messer | (1891) | |
| Liquidators of the Maritime Bank of Canada v. Receiver-General of New Brunswick (New Brunswick, Canada) | [1892] A.C. 437 | Canadian provincial sovereignty |
| Makin v. Attorney General for New South Wales (Australia) | (1894) | evidence of similar fact |
| Attorney-General for Ontario v. Attorney-General for the Dominion (Ontario, Canada) | [1896] AC 348 | national concern doctrine of Canadian constitution |
| Attorney General of Canada v. Attorney General of Ontario | [1898] A.C. 700 (P.C.) | turf war aka Provincial Fisheries Reference |
| Union Colliery Co. of British Columbia v. Bryden (British Columbia, Canada) | [1899] A.C. 580 | |

== 1900–2000 ==
| Case name | Citation | Subject |
|---|---|---|
| Cunningham v Homma (British Columbia, Canada) | [1903] A.C. 151 | Law preventing Japanese vote found valid; overridden by the Canadian Citizenship Act 1946 |
| Bank of Montreal v Stuart | [1910] UKPC 53 | Undue influence |
| Attorney-General for Ontario v Attorney-General of Canada (Reference Appeal) (Ontario, Canada) | [1912] A.C. 571 | |
| Royal Bank of Canada v. The King (Canada) | [1913] A.C. 283 | |
| Canada v. Alberta (Canada) | [1922] A.C. 191 | Emergency doctrine of Constitution of Canada |
| Fort Frances Pulp and Paper v. Manitoba Free Press (Canada) | (1923) | |
| Brooks-Bidlake and Whittall Limited v. Attorney-General for British Columbia (Canada) | [1923] A.C. 450 (P.C.) | |
| Toronto Electric Commissioners v. Snider (Ontario, Canada) | [1925] A.C. 396 | |
| Nadan v The King (Canada) | [1926] A.C. 482(PC) | Removal of Canadian appeal to the JCPC held unconstitutional in criminal cases |
1926 – criminal appeals from Canada restored
| Edwards v. Canada (Attorney General) (Canada) | [1930] A.C. 124 | Women's right to sit in the Senate of Canada |
| Proprietary Articles Trade Association v. Attorney General of Canada (Canada) | [1931] A.C. 310 (P.C.) | |
| In re Regulation and Control of Aeronautics in Canada (Canada) | [1932] A.C. 54 | |
| In re Regulation and Control of Radio Communication in Canada (Canada) | [1932] A.C. 304 | |
1933 – no more criminal appeals from Canada
| British Coal Corporation v. the King (Canada) | [1935] A.C. 500 | Upheld authority of Canadian Parliament to abolish appeals to the Privy Council in criminal cases. |
| Attorney-General of Canada v. Attorney-General of Ontario (Labour Conventions) (Ontario, Canada) | [1937] A.C. 326 | |
| Sifton v. Sifton | [1938] A.C. 656 | Certainty of conditions in a devise |
| Vita Food Products Inc. v. Unus Shipping Co. Ltd. (Nova Scotia, Canada) | [1939] A.C. 277 | An express choice of law clause in a contract should be honoured as long as the agreement was bona fide and not against public policy. |
| Francis, Day & Hunter Ltd. v. Twentieth Century Fox Corp. | [1939] 4 D.L.R. 353 | Copyright in titles |
| Ontario (Attorney General) v. Canada Temperance Federation (Ontario, Canada) | (1946) | Examined the peace, order, and good government power of the Constitution Act, 1867 |
1949 – no more civil appeals from Canada
| Subramaniam v Public Prosecutor | [1956] 1 WLR 965 | Hearsay exception |
| Overseas Tankship v Morts Dock & Engineering Co. Ltd. (The Wagon Mound No. 1) (Australia) | [1961] A.C. 388 | Leading authority on remoteness of damage in negligence. |
| Overseas Tankship v Miller Steamship Co. (The Wagon Mound No. 2) (Australia) | [1967] A.C. 617 | Defined remoteness of damages in a nuisance tort action |
| Goldman v Hargrave | [1967] 1 A.C. 645 | |
| The Eurymedon (New Zealand) | [1975] A.C. 154 | Conditions of when a third party may seek protection of an exclusion clause in a contract between two parties. |
| Pao On v. Lau Yiu Long (Hong Kong) | [1980] A.C. 614 | |
| Ong Ah Chuan v. Public Prosecutor (Singapore) | [1980] UKPC 32, [1981] A.C. 648, [1981] 1 M.L.J. [Malayan Law Journal] 64, [1979–1980] S.L.R.(R.) [Singapore Law Reports (Reissue)] 710 | Constitutionality of provisions in the Misuse of Drugs Act 1973 (No. 5 of 1973) creating a rebuttable presumption of drug trafficking and imposing the mandatory death penalty for certain drug trafficking offences. |
| Cadbury Schweppes Pty Ltd v. Pub Squash Co Pty Ltd | [1980] 2 N.S.W.L.R. 851 (JCPC) | |
| Commissioner of Inland Revenue v Challenge Corp Ltd (New Zealand) | [1986] NZPC 1; [1986] UKPC 45; [1987] AC 155 | |
| Takaro Properties Ltd v Rowling (New Zealand) | [1987] UKPC 34 | |
1989 – appeals from Singapore restricted
| Lee Ting Sang v Chung Chi-Keung (Hong Kong) | [1990] UKPC 9 | |
| Philips v Attorney General of Hong Kong (Hong Kong) | [1993] UKPC 3a | Liquidated damages |
1994 – no more appeals from Singapore
| Goss v Chilcott | [1996] UKPC 17 (23 May 1996) | |
1997 – no more appeals from Hong Kong

== 2001 onwards ==
=== 2001-2008 ===
| Case name | Citation | Subject |
|---|---|---|
| T Choithram International SA v Pagarani – British Virgin Islands | [2001] 2 All ER 492 | Vesting of "imperfect gifts" |
| Dextra Bank & Trust Company Limited v Bank of Jamaica – Jamaica | [2002] 1 All ER (Comm) 193, [2001] UKPC 50 | |
| Pratt Contractors Ltd v Transit New Zealand - New Zealand | | Tendering law |
| Bernard v. Attorney General of Jamaica - Jamaica | [2004] UKPC 47 | A vicarious liability case |
| Citco Banking Corporation NV v Pusser's Ltd - British Virgin Islands | [2007] UKPC 13 | Validity of amendments to company's constitutional documents |

=== 2009 ===
| Case name | Citation | Subject |
|---|---|---|
| Johannes Deuss v The Attorney General for Bermuda and The Commissioner of Police for Bermuda | [2009] UKPC 38 | |
| GFN SA and Artag Meridian Limited v The Liquidators of Bancredit Cayman Limited (In Official Liquidation) | [2009] UKPC 39 | |
| Peter Michel v The Queen | [2009] UKPC 40 | |
| Francis Eiley and others v The Queen (Belize) | [2009] UKPC 41 | |
| Dave Burnett v The State of Trinidad & Tobago | [2009] UKPC 42 | |
| Hearing on the Report of the Chief Justice of Gibraltar | [2009] UKPC 43 | |
| Save Guana Cay Reef Association Limited v The Queen & Others | [2009] UKPC 44 | |
| Pell Frischmann Engineering Limited v Bow Valley Iran Limited & Others (3) | [2009] UKPC 45 | |
| Texan Management Limited & Others v Pacific Electric Wire & Cable Company Limited | [2009] UKPC 46 | |
| Kenneth McKinney Higgs, Senior v Leshel Maryas Investment Company Limited and Annamae Woodside | [2009] UKPC 47 | |
| Lowell Lawrence v Financial Services Commission | [2009] UKPC 48 | |
| The Attorney General of Trinidad and Tobago v Carmel Smith | [2009] UKPC 49 | |
| Herman Ramdass v Marilyn Bahaw - Nanan | [2009] UKPC 50 | |
| Nadine Rodriguez v Minister of Housing of the Government & Another | [2009] UKPC 51 | |
| Nadine Rodriguez v Minister of Housing of the Government & Another | [2009] UKPC 52 | |
| Josine Johnson and Yuclan Balwant v The Attorney General of Trinidad and Tobago | [2009] UKPC 52 | |

=== 2010 ===
| Case name | Citation | Subject |
|---|---|---|
| Mossell (Jamaica) Limited (T/A Digicel) v The Office of Utilities Regulation, Cable and Wireless J A Limited and Centennial JA Limited | [2010] UKPC 1 | |
| Cyril Archibold Capron v The Government of the Turks and Caicos Islands and the Crown | [2010] UKPC 2 | |
| Theresa Henry & Marie Ann Mitchell v Calixtus Henry (St Lucia) | [2010] UKPC 3 | |
| Keith O'Connor v Paul Haufman Percival Piccott | [2010] UKPC 4 | |
| Sherman McNicholls v Judicial and Legal Service Commission | [2010] UKPC 5 | |
| Sherman McNicholls v Judicial and Legal Service Commission | [2010] UKPC 6 | |
| The Prime Minister of Belize and The Attorney General of Belize v Alberto Vellos and Others | [2010] UKPC 7 | |
| Patrick Thomas Tibbetts v The Attorney General of The Cayman Islands | [2010] UKPC 8 | |
| Larry Winslow Marshall & Others v The Deputy Governor of Bermuda & Others | [2010] UKPC 9 | |
| Mrs Fatma Bibi Mahmood Nahaboo and Others v N Parsooramen and Co and Others | [2010] UKPC 10 | |
| Societe Royal Gardens et Compagnie and 138 others v The Mauritius Revenue Authority as represented by its Director General (formerly the Commissioner of Income Tax) | [2010] UKPC 11 | |
| Devendranath Hurnam v Kailashing Bholah and Soobashsing Bholah | [2010] UKPC 12 | |
| Gangasing Aubeeluck v The State of Mauritius | [2010] UKPC 13 | |
| Rosalind Ramroop (also called Rosalind Sampson) v John Ishmael and Lall Heerasingh | [2010] UKPC 14 | |
| Charmaine Bernard (Legal Representative of the Estate of Reagan Nicky Bernard) v Ramesh Seebalack | [2010] UKPC 15 | |
| Marie Jean Nelson Mirbel & Others v The State of Mauritius & Others | [2010] UKPC 16 | |
| Razcoomar Moodoosoodun v The State of Mauritius | [2010] UKPC 17 | |
| Kirk Gordon v The Queen | [2010] UKPC 18 | |
| Seeromani Maraj-Naraynsingh v The Attorney General of Trinidad and Tobago and The Director of Public Prosecutions | [2010] UKPC 19 | |
| Andrew Ryan Ferrell v The Queen (Gibraltar) | [2010] UKPC 20 | |
| Cosimo Borrelli As Liquidator of AKAI Holdings Limited and Others (2) v Mr James Henry Ting and Others (2) | [2010] UKPC 21 | |
| Earlin White v The Queen (Belize) | [2010] UKPC 22 | |
| Romauld James v The Attorney General of Trinidad and Tobago | [2010] UKPC 23 | |
| Report of The Tribunal to The Governor of The Cayman Islands - Madam Justice Levers (Judge of The Grand Court of The Cayman Islands) | [2010] UKPC 24 | |
| Cable & Wireless (West Indies) Limited v Conrad Tonge et al, represented by The Antigua and Barbuda Workers' Union | [2010] UKPC 25 | |
| Noel Campbell v The Queen (Jamaica) | [2010] UKPC 26 | |
| Leedon Limited v Mr Ghanshyam Hurry & Others (5) | [2010] UKPC 27 | |
| E Anthony Ross v Bank of Commerce (Saint Kitts Nevis) Trust and Savings Association Limited | [2010] UKPC 28 | |
| The Public Service Appeal Board v Omar Maraj | [2010] UKPC 29 | |
| The Palms Resort Limited v P.P.C. Limited | [2010] UKPC 30 | |
| The National Transport Authority v Mauritius Secondary Industry Limited | [2010] UKPC 31 | |
| Francis Paponette and Others (3) v The Attorney General of Trinidad and Tobago | [2010] UKPC 32 | |
| Culross Global Limited v Strategic Turnaround Master Partnership | [2010] UKPC 33 | |

=== 2011 ===
| Case name | Citation | Subject |
|---|---|---|
| Charles Villeneuve v Joel Gaillard (Bahamas) | [2011] UKPC 1, [2011] UKPC 6 | |
| Steven Kent Jervis (1) KST Investments Limited (2) v Victor John Skinner | [2011] UKPC 2 | |
| Dennis Alma Robinson v The Queen | [2011] UKPC 3 | |
| Bahamas Hotel Maintenance & Allied Workers Union v Bahamas Hotel Catering & Allied Workers Union (1); West Bay Management Limited (2) and The Attorney General of The Commonwealth of The Bahamas (3) | [2011] UKPC 4 | |
| Nigel Sookram v The Queen (Grenada) | [2011] UKPC 5 | |
| Fellowes International Holdings Limited v Kyrgyz Mobil Tel Limited and Others (Respondents), AK Investment CJSC v Kyrgyz Mobil Tel Limited and Others (Respondents), Altimo Holdings and Investment Limited and Others v Kyrgyz Mobil Tel Limited and Others (Respondents), CP-Credit Prive SA v Kyrgyz Mobil Tel Limited and Others (Respondents) | [2011] UKPC 7 | |
| John Thompson & Janet Thompson (Original Appellants/Cross Respondents) v Goblin Hill Hotels Limited (Original Respondents/Cross Appellants) | [2011] UKPC 8 | |
| Edwin M Hughes v La Baia Limited | [2011] UKPC 9 | |
| Curtis Francis Warren and others v Her Majesty's Attorney General of the Bailiwick of Jersey | [2011] UKPC 10 | |
| Peter Stewart v The Queen (Jamaica) | [2011] UKPC 11 | |
| Rohan Vidal and Kevin Thompson v The Queen (Jamaica) | [2011] UKPC 12 | |
| Spread Trustee Company Limited v Sarah Ann Hutcheson & Others (Guernsey) | [2011] UKPC 13 | |
| Nimrod Miguel v The Republic of Trinidad & Tobago | [2011] UKPC 14 | |
| Tabeel Lewis v The State | [2011] UKPC 15 | |
| Maxo Tido v The Queen | [2011] UKPC 16 | |
| Tasarruf Mevduati Sigorta Fonu v Merrill Lynch Bank and Trust Company (Cayman) Limited and others | [2011] UKPC 17 | |
| Rajendra Krishna v The State (Respondent) | [2011] UKPC 18 | |
| The Emile Elias & Company Limited v The Attorney General of Trinidad and Tobago (Respondent) | [2011] UKPC 19 | |
| The Honourable Prime Minister, Mr Patrick Manning and others v Ganga Persad Kissoon (Trinidad and Tobago), The Emile Elias & Company Limited v The Attorney General of Trinidad and Tobago (Respondent) | [2011] UKPC 20 | |
| Phillip Tillett v The Queen | [2011] UKPC 21 | |
| Antonio Webster v The Attorney General of Trinidad and Tobago (Trinidad and Tobago) | [2011] UKPC 22 | |
| Rhett Allen Fuller v The Attorney General of Belize | [2011] UKPC 23 | |
| Winston Gibson v Public Service Commission | [2011] UKPC 24 | |
| Ranjan Rampersad v Commissioner of Police & Police Service Commission | [2011] UKPC 25 | |
| Robert Ramsahai v Teaching Service Commission | [2011] UKPC 26 | |
| Ashford Sankar & Ors v Public Service Commission, Hermia Tyson-Cuffie v Public Service Commission (Trinidad and Tobago) | [2011] UKPC 27 | |
| Gopichand Ganga & Others v Commissioner of Police (Trinidad and Tobago) | [2011] UKPC 28 | |
| Consolidated Contractors International Company SAL v Mr Munib Masri (Bermuda) | [2011] UKPC 29 | |
| The Legal Representative of Succession Paul de Maroussem v The Director-General, Mauritius Revenue Authority (Mauritius) | [2011] UKPC 30 | |
| Electra Daniel Administrator ad litem for the Estate of George Daniel (deceased) v The Attorney General of Trinidad and Tobago (Respondent) | [2011] UKPC 31 | |
| Adamas Limited v Mrs Yong Ting Ping How Fok Cheung | [2011] UKPC 32 | |
| Culross Global Limited v Strategic Turnaround Master Partnership | [2011] UKPC 33 | |
| Ernest Lockhart v The Queen | [2011] UKPC 34 | |
| The Belize Bank Limited v The Association of Concerned Belizeans and others (7) (Respondents) | [2011] UKPC 35 | |
| The Belize Bank Limited v The Attorney General of Belize and others | [2011] UKPC 36 | |
| The Attorney General v Universal Projects Limited (Trinidad and Tobago) | [2011] UKPC 37 | |
| The Attorney General v Keron Matthews (Trinidad and Tobago) | [2011] UKPC 38 | |
| Omar Grieves and others v The Queen (Respondent) | [2011] UKPC 39 | |
| Total Mauritius Limited v Mauritius Revenue Authority | [2011] UKPC 40 | |
| Phillip McKenzie v The Queen | [2011] UKPC 41 | |
| Total Mauritius Limited v Mauritius Revenue Authority | [2011] UKPC 42 | |
| Saint Aubin Limitee v Alain Jean Francois Doger de Speville (Mauritius) | [2011] UKPC 43 | |
| Samuel Robie v The Queen | [2011] UKPC 44 | |
| The Director of Public Prosecutions v A A Bholah (Respondent) | [2011] UKPC 45 | |
| Dany Sylvie Marie Dhojaven Vencadsamy and 103 others v The Electoral Commissioner & Ors (Mauritius) | [2011] UKPC 46 | |
| Dennis Graham v Police Service Commission (1) and the Attorney General of the Trinidad and Tobago (2) (Respondents) | [2011] UKPC 46 | |
| Sugar Investment Trust v Jyoti Jeetun (Mauritius) | [2011] UKPC 47 | |
| Joseph Lennox Holmes v Royal College of Veterinary Surgeons (Respondent) | [2011] UKPC 48 | |

=== 2012 ===
| Case name | Citation | Subject |
|---|---|---|
| David Gopaul on behalf of H V Holdings Limited v Vitra Imam Baksh on behalf of the Incorporated Trustees of the Presbyterian Church of Trinidad and Tobago | [2012] UKPC 1 | |
| Nigel Brown v The State (Trinidad and Tobago) | [2012] UKPC 2 | |
| Ian Seepersad and Roodal Panchoo v The Attorney General of Trinidad and Tobago | [2012] UKPC 4 | |
| Dylan Simon v Manuel Paul Helmot (Respondent) | [2012] UKPC 5 | |
| Deenish Benjamin and Deochan Ganga v The State (Trinidad and Tobago) | [2012] UKPC 6 | |
| [J & O Operations Limited and another]; Eloise Mulligan and Grace Wong v The Kingston & Saint Andrew Corporation (Respondent) | [2012] UKPC 7 | |
| Sans Souci Limited v VRL Services Limited (Jamaica) | [2012] UKPC 8 | |
| Commissioner of Taxpayer Audit and Assessment v Cigarette Company of Jamaica Limited (in Voluntary Liquidation) (Respondent) | [2012] UKPC 9 | |
| The Superintendent of Her Majesty's Foxhill Prison & another v Viktor Kozeny (Bahamas) | [2012] UKPC 10 | |
| Terrell Neilly v The Queen (Bahamas) | [2012] UKPC 12 | |
| Margaret Toumany and another v Mardaynaiken Veerasamy (Mauritius) | [2012] UKPC 13 | |
| Lamusse Sek Sum & Co v Late Bai Rehmatbai Waqf (Respondent) | [2012] UKPC 14 | |
| Marcus Jason Daniel v The State | [2012] UKPC 15 | |
| Chandrawtee Ramsingh v The Attorney General of Trinidad and Tobago (Respondent) | [2012] UKPC 16 | |
| The Queen ex parte Mario Hoffmann v The Commissioner for the Turks and Caicos Islands Commission of Inquiry (2008-2009) and The Governor of the Turks and Caicos Islands (Respondents) | [2012] UKPC 17 | |
| Sakoor Patel and others v Anandsing Beenessreesing and Sicom Ltd (Respondents) | [2012] UKPC 18 | |
| Dookee v The State of Mauritius and another (Respondents) | [2012] UKPC 19 | |
| Li Chen Ling Kaw v Societe Piang Sang Pere et Fils and Mr Chong Fee Ng Wong (Mauritius) | [2012] UKPC 21 | |
| Dookee v The State of Mauritius and another (Respondents) | [2012] UKPC 22 | |
| Rooplall Beerjeraz & others v Mrs Moonesh Amrita Dabee (Mauritius) | [2012] UKPC 23 | |
| Smegh (Ile Maurice) Ltée v Dharmendra Persad (Mauritius) | [2012] UKPC 24 | |
| Donald Phipps v The Director of Public Prosecutions and the Attorney General of Jamaica | [2012] UKPC 25 | |
| Kelly and others v Fraser (Respondent) | [2012] UKPC 26 | |
| La Generale des Carrieres et des Mines v F G Hemisphere Associates LLC (Respondent) | [2012] UKPC 27 | |
| Mark France and Rupert Vassell v The Queen | [2012] UKPC 28 | |
| Harinath Ramoutar v Commissioner of Prisons and another (Respondents) | [2012] UKPC 29 | |
| Richardson Anthony Arthur v The Attorney General of the Turks and Caicos Islands (Respondent) | [2012] UKPC 30 | |
| The Presidential Insurance Company Limited v Resha St. Hill (Trinidad and Tobago) | [2012] UKPC 32 | |
| The descendants of Utanga and Arerangi Tumu v The descendants of Iopu Tuma (Cook Islands) | [2012] UKPC 33 | |
| June Margaret Baudinet v Ellen Tavioni and another (Cook Islands) | [2012] UKPC 34 | |
| Ramone Drysdale v The Queen (Jamaica) | [2012] UKPC 35 | |
| Anneth Livingston v The Queen (Jamaica) | [2012] UKPC 36 | |
| Carlos Hamilton and Jason Lewis v The Queen (Jamaica) | [2012] UKPC 37, [2012] UKPC 31 | |
| Taitt (AP) v The State (Republic of Trinidad and Tobago) (Respondent) | [2012] UKPC 38 | |
| Chief Justice of the Cayman Islands v The Governor (Respondent) | [2012] UKPC 39 | |
| Anthony Armbrister and Cyril Armbrister (as Personal Representatives of the Estate of Francis Armbrister) v Marion E Lightbourn and others | [2012] UKPC 40 | |
| Lesage v The Mauritius Commercial Bank Limited (Respondent) | [2012] UKPC 41 | |
| Lancashire Insurance Company Limited v MS Frontier Reinsurance Ltd (Respondent) | [2012] UKPC 42 | |

=== 2013 ===
| Case name | Citation | Subject |
|---|---|---|
| Cukurova Finance International Ltd & another v Alfa Telecom Turkey Limited | [2013] UKPC 2 and [2012] UKPC 20 - British Virgin Islands | Nature of the remedy of appropriation introduced into English law under the EU Directive 2002/47/EC of 6 June 2002 of the European Parliament and of the Council on financial collateral arrangements |
| Oceania Heights Limited v Willard Clarke Enterprises Limited and Others | [2013] UKPC 3 | |
| Ebbvale Limited v Andrew Lawrence Hosking (Trustee in Bankruptcy of Andreas Sofroniou Michaelides) | [2013] UKPC 1 | |
| Hassen Eid En Rummun v The State of Mauritius | [2013] UKPC 6 | |
| American Jewellery Company and others v Commercial Corporation Jamaica Limited and others | [2013] UKPC 5 | |
| Director General, Mauritius Revenue Authority v Central Water Authority | [2013] UKPC 4 | |
| Sherry (AP) v The Queen | [2013] UKPC 7 | |
| Elgin Wright & Others v Buildings Heritage Limited (Bahamas) | [2013] UKPC 10 | |
| The Attorney General of the Turks and Caicos Islands and anotherv Richardson (as Trustee in Bankruptcy of Yellowstone Club World LLC | [2013] UKPC 9 | |
| Bonnett Taylor v The Queen (Jamaica) | [2013] UKPC 8 | |
| Hendrick v Mutual Indemnity (Bermuda) Limited and Others | [2013] UKPC 13 | |
| Mutual Holdings (Bermuda) Limited and others v Diane Hendricks and others | [2013] UKPC 13 | |
| Thomas Townsend and Therese Townsend (Deceased) v Persistence Holdings Limited (British Virgin Islands) | [2013] UKPC 12 | |
| New Falmouth Resorts Limited v International Hotels Jamaica Limited | [2013] UKPC 11 | |
| Laing v The Queen | [2013] UKPC 14 | |
| Terrence Calix v The Attorney General of Trinidad and Tobago | [2013] UKPC 15 | |
| Crawford Adjusters (Cayman) Limited and others v Sagicor General Insurance (Cayman) Limited and another | [2013] UKPC 17 | |
| French v Public Prosecutor of the Central Department of Investigation and Prosecution in Lisbon Portugal | [2013] UKPC 16 | |
| Prime Sight Limited (A Company Registered According to the Laws of Gibraltar) v Edgar Charles Lavarello (Official Trustee of the Property of Benjamin Marrache a Bankrupt) (Gibraltar) | [2013] UKPC 22 | |
| Welch v The Attorney General | [2013] UKPC 21 | |
| Cukurova Finance International Limited and another v Alfa Telecom Turkey Limited | [2013] UKPC 20 & [2013] UKPC 25 | |
| The Appeal Commissioners v The Bank of Nova Scotia | [2013] UKPC 19 | |
| Caribbean Steel Company Limited v Price Waterhouse (a Firm) | [2013] UKPC 18 | |
| The Director General, Mauritius Revenue Authority v Paradis Brabant Hotel | [2013] UKPC 24 | |
| Antigua Power Company Limited v The Attorney General of Antigua and Barbuda and others | [2013] UKPC 23 | |
| Monica Jane Ramnarine v Chandra Bose Ramnarine (Trinidad and Tobago) | [2013] UKPC 27 | |
| Ackerley v Her Majesty's Attorney General of the Isle of Man | [2013] UKPC 26 | |
| Lundy v The Queen | [2013] UKPC 28 | |
| Selassie v The Queen | [2013] UKPC 29 | |
| Pearman v The Queen | [2013] UKPC 29 | |
| General Construction Limited v (1) Chue Wing & Co Ltd (2) Ibrahim Cassam & Co Ltd (in Liquidation) (Mauritius) | [2013] UKPC 30 | |
| Bethel and Others v The Attorney General of the Commonwealth of Bahamas | [2013] UKPC 31 | |
| Dominique Moss v The Queen | [2013] UKPC 32 | |

=== 2014 ===
| Case name | Citation | Subject |
|---|---|---|
| Piganiol v Smegh (Île Maurice) Ltée | [2014] UKPC 1 | |
| Lawrence v The Queen | [2014] UKPC 2 | |
| Daniel v The State | [2014] UKPC 3 | |
| Holt v Her Majesty's Attorney General on behalf of the Queen | [2014] UKPC 4 | |
| The Attorney General v HMB Holdings Limited (Respondent)(Antigua and Barbuda) | [2014] UKPC 5 | |
| Real Time Systems Limited v Renraw Investments Limited and others | [2014] UKPC 6 | |
| Ramdeen v The State | [2014] UKPC 7 | |
| Commissioner of Police and Attorney General v Steadroy C O Benjamin | [2014] UKPC 8 | |
| Quilvest Finance Limited and others v Fairfield Sentry Limited | [2014] UKPC 9 | |
| UBS AG New York and Others v Fairfield Sentry Limited (in Liquidation) | [2014] UKPC 9 | |
| Credit Suisse London Nominees Limited and another v Fairfield Sentry Limited (in Liquidation) | [2014] UKPC 9 | |
| Lombard, Odier & CIE and others v Fairfield Sentry Limited (in Liquidation) | [2014] UKPC 9 | |
| Fairfield Sentry Limited (in Liquidation) v Alfredo Migani and others | [2014] UKPC 9 | |
| Den Danske A/S v Surinam Shipping Limited and others | [2014] UKPC 10 | |
| Dhooharika v The Director of Public Prosecutions | [2014] UKPC 11 | |
| Melvin Maycock Senior v The United States of America and another | [2014] UKPC 12 | |
| Trevor Roberts and Devroy Moss v The Attorney General of the Commonwealth of the Bahamas and the Government of the United States of America | [2014] UKPC 12 | |
| Sheldon Moore v The Commissioner of Police | [2014] UKPC 12 | |
| Shanto Curry v The Commissioner of Police | [2014] UKPC 12 | |
| Gordon Newbold v The Commissioner of Police | [2014] UKPC 12 | |
| Royal College of Veterinary Surgeons v Samuel | [2014] UKPC 13 | |
| Stoutt v The Queen | [2014] UKPC 14 | |
| Cukurova Holdings A S v Sonera Holdings B V | [2014] UKPC 15 | |
| Gayadeen and another v The Attorney General of Trinidad and Tobago | [2014] UKPC 16 | |
| Landmark Limited and another v American International Bank (In receivership) | [2014] UKPC 17 | |
| Adele Shtern v Monica Cummings | [2014] UKPC 18 | |
| Sabapathee v The Director of Public Prosecutions | [2014] UKPC 19 | |
| Pfizer Limited v Medimpex Jamaica Limited and another | [2014] UKPC 20 | |
| Beacon Insurance Company Limited v Maharaj Bookstore Limited | [2014] UKPC 21 | |
| Yiacoub and another v The Queen | [2014] UKPC 22 | |
| Bimini Blue Coalition Limited v The Prime Minister of The Bahamas and others | [2014] UKPC 23 | |
| Dennis Dean and another v Arawak Homes Ltd | [2014] UKPC 24 | |
| TLM Company Limited v Bedasie (Administratix of the Estate of Ryan Bedasie, Deceased) and another (Trinidad and Tobago) | [2014] UKPC 25 | |
| Singh v The Public Service Commission | [2014] UKPC 26 | |
| Beezadhur v The Independent Commission against Corruption and another | [2014] UKPC 27 | |
| Jamaican Redevelopment Foundation Inc v Real Estate Board (Jamaica) | [2014] UKPC 28 | |
| Trevor Williamson v The Attorney General of Trinidad and Tobago | [2014] UKPC 29 | |
| Nelson and others v First Caribbean International Bank (Barbados) Limited (Saint Lucia) | [2014] UKPC 30 | |
| Alternative Power Solution Limited v Central Electricity Board and another | [2014] UKPC 31 | |
| Lovell Romain v The Police Service Commission | [2014] UKPC 32 | |
| Fortis TCI Limited v Islandcom Telecommunications Limited | [2014] UKPC 33 | |
| Baldwin King and Hariette Richardson v Gershon Robertson | [2014] UKPC 34 | |
| Price Waterhouse Coopers v Saad Investments Company Limited and another (Bermuda) | [2014] UKPC 35 | |
| Singularis Holdings Ltd v Price Waterhouse Coopers (Bermuda) | [2014] UKPC 36 | |
| Alhamrani and others v Alhamrani (British Virgin Islands) | [2014] UKPC 37 | |
| Dixon v Kingdom of Spain (Gibraltar) | [2014] UKPC 38 | |
| UC Rusal Alimina Jamaica Limited and others v Wynette Miller and others (Jamaica) | [2014] UKPC 39 | |
| Crociani and others v Crociani and others (Jersey) | [2014] UKPC 40 | |
| Stichting Shell Pensioenfonds v Krys - British Virgin Islands | [2014] UKPC 41 | Anti-suit injunctions relating to insolvency proceedings |
| Peerthum v The Independent Commission against Corruption and another (Mauritius) | [2014] UKPC 42 | |
| Mitchell v Georges (St Vincent and the Grenadines) | [2014] UKPC 43 | |

=== 2015 ===
| Case name | Citation | Subject |
|---|---|---|
| Assets Recovery Agency (Ex-parte) (Jamaica) | [2015] UKPC 1 | |
| Nilon Limited v Royal Westminster Investments S.A. - British Virgin Islands | [2015] UKPC 2 | Rectification of the share register; anchor defendants; forum non conveniens |
| Alleyne and others v The Attorney General of Trinidad and Tobago | [2015] UKPC 3 | |
| The Presidential Insurance Company Ltd v Mohammed and others | [2015] UKPC 4 | |
| Seetohul v Omni Projects Ltd | [2015] UKPC 5 | |
| National Stadium Project (Grenada) Corporation v NH International (Caribbean) Limited (Trinidad and Tobago) | [2015] UKPC 6 | |
| Director of Public Prosecutions v Nelson (Antigua and Barbuda) | [2015] UKPC 7 | |
| Gomes v The State (Trinidad and Tobago) | [2015] UKPC 8 | |
| Pora v The Queen (New Zealand) | [2015] UKPC 9 | This case was the last one from New Zealand to be heard by the J.C.P.C.. |
| Annissa Webster and others v The Attorney General of Trinidad and Tobago | [2015] UKPC 10 | |
| Central Bank of Ecuador and others v Conticorp SA and others (Bahamas) | [2015] UKPC 11 | |
| Fazal Ghany v Attorney General and Another (Trinidad and Tobago) | [2015] UKPC 12 | |
| Credit Agricole Corporation and Investment Bank v Papadimitriou (Gibraltar) | [2015] UKPC 13 | |
| Mauri Garments Trading and Marketing Limited v The Mauritius Commercial Bank Ltd (Mauritius) | [2015] UKPC 14 | |
| Rainbow Insurance Co Ltd v The Financial Services Commission and others (Mauritius) | [2015] UKPC 15 | |
| JMMB Merchant Bank Limited (Formerly Capital and Credit Merchant Bank Ltd) v The Real Estate Board (Jamaica) | [2015] UKPC 16 | |
| Gold Rock Corp Limited and another v Nylund Hylton (Bahamas) | [2015] UKPC 17 | |
| Duporte v The Queen (St Christopher and Nevis) | [2015] UKPC 18 | |
| Eutetra Bromfield v Vincent Bromfield (Jamaica) | [2015] UKPC 19 | |
| Leymunlall Nandrame and others v Lomass Ramsaran (Mauritius) | [2015] UKPC 20 | |
| Brantley and others v Constituency Boundaries Commission and others (St Christopher and Nevis) | [2015] UKPC 21 | |
| Elizabeth Ram (Administrator of the Estate of Pearl Baboolal) v Motor and General Insurance Company Limited (Trinidad and Tobago) | [2015] UKPC 22 | |
| Hall v Maritek Bahamas Ltd (The Bahamas) | [2015] UKPC 23 | |
| Alcide v Desir and another (Saint Lucia) | [2015] UKPC 24 | |
| Saverettiar v Saverettiar (Mauritius) | [2015] UKPC 25 | |
| Republic Bank Limited v Lochan and another (Trinidad and Tobago) | [2015] UKPC 26 | |
| Boufoy-Bastick v The University of the West Indies (Jamaica) | [2015] UKPC 27 | |
| Maharaj and another v Johnson and others (Trinidad and Tobago) | [2015] UKPC 28 | |
| Peerless Limited v Gambling Regulatory Authority and others (Mauritius) | [2015] UKPC 29 | |
| Hickox and others v Brilla Capital Investment Master Fund SPC Limited and others (Anguilla) | [2015] UKPC 30 | |
| Misick and others v The Queen (Turks and Caicos) | [2015] UKPC 31 | |
| Silver Point Condominium Apartments v Johann D Swart and others (The Bahamas) | [2015] UKPC 32 | |
| Apollon Metaxides v Swart and others (The Bahamas) | [2015] UKPC 32 | |
| Hunte and another v The State (Trinidad and Tobago) | [2015] UKPC 33 | |
| Robinson v The State (Trinidad and Tobago) | [2015] UKPC 34 | |
| The Federal Republic of Brazil and another v Durant International Corporation and another (Jersey) | [2015] UKPC 35 | |
| ArcelorMittal Point Lisas Limited (formerly Caribbean ISPAT Limited) v Steel Workers Union of Trinidad and Tobago (Trinidad and Tobago) | [2015] UKPC 36 | |
| NH International (Caribbean) Limited v National Insurance Property Development Company Limited (No 2) (Trinidad and Tobago) | [2015] UKPC 37 | |
| NH International (Caribbean) Limited v National Insurance Property Development Company Limited (Trinidad and Tobago) | [2015] UKPC 37 | |
| Mungalsingh v Juman (Trinidad and Tobago) | [2015] UKPC 38 | |
| The Central Tenders Board and another v White (trading as White Construction Services) (Montserrat) | [2015] UKPC 39 | |
| Brangman v The Queen (Bermuda) | [2015] UKPC 40 | |
| Cox v The Queen (Bermuda) | [2015] UKPC 40 | |
| Myers v The Queen (Bermuda) | [2015] UKPC 40 | |
| Pinard-Byrne v Lennox Linton (Dominica) | [2015] UKPC 41 | |
| Milton and another v The Queen (British Virgin Islands) | [2015] UKPC 42 | |
| The National Housing Trust v YP Seaton & Associates Company Limited (Jamaica) | [2015] UKPC 43 | |
| The Queen v Crawford (Cayman Islands) | [2015] UKPC 44 | |
| Total Mauritius Limited v Abdurrahman (Mauritius) | [2015] UKPC 45 | |
| Krys and others v KBC Partners LP and others (British Virgin Islands) | [2015] UKPC 46 | |
| Insurance Company of the Bahamas Ltd v Eric Antonio (The Bahamas) | [2015] UKPC 47 | |
| The Director General, Mauritius Revenue Authority v Chettiar and others (Mauritius) | [2015] UKPC 48 | |

=== 2016 ===
| Case name | Citation | Subject |
|---|---|---|
| Anzen Limited and others v Hermes One Limited (British Virgin Islands) | [2016] UKPC 1 | |
| Williams v The Bermuda Hospitals Board (Bermuda) | [2016] UKPC 4 | |
| Hallman Holding Ltd v Webster and another (Anguilla) | [2016] UKPC 3 | |
| Ameer Edoo v The Attorney General of Trinidad and Tobago | [2016] UKPC 2 | |
| Maritime Life (Caribbean) Limited and others v The Attorney General of Trinidad and Tobago | [2016] UKPC 2 | |
| Steve Ferguson v The Attorney General of Trinidad and Tobago | [2016] UKPC 2 | |
| Vizcaya Partners Limited v Picard and another (Gibraltar) | [2016] UKPC 5 | |
| Richard Brown v The Queen (Jamaica) | [2016] UKPC 6 | |
| Ruddock v The Queen (Jamaica) | [2016] UKPC 7 | |
| Advantage General Insurance Company Limited v The Commissioner of Taxpayer Appeals (Jamaica) | [2016] UKPC 8 | |
| Ennismore Fund Management Limited v Fenris Consulting Limited (Cayman Islands) | [2016] UKPC 9 | |
| Brown's Bay Resort Ltd v Pozzoni (Antigua and Barbuda) | [2016] UKPC 10 | |
| Koo Seen Lin v Grewals (Mauritius) Ltd (Mauritius) | [2016] UKPC 11 | |
| Grewals (Mauritius) Ltd v Koo Seen Lin (Mauritius) | [2016] UKPC 11 | |
| Societe des Chasseurs de L'Ile Maurice and others v The State of Mauritius and another (Mauritius) | [2016] UKPC 13 | |
| Shophold (Mauritius) Ltd v The Assessment Review Committee and another (Mauritius) | [2016] UKPC 12 | |
| Bade v The Queen (Solomon Islands) | [2016] UKPC 14 | This is the only case taken to the J.C.P.C. from the Solomon Islands since attaining independence in 1978. |
| Vendort Traders Inc v Evrostroy Grupp LLC (British Virgin Islands) | [2016] UKPC 15 | |
| In the matter of the Baronetcy of Pringle of Stichill | [2016] UKPC 16 | |
| The United Policyholders Group and others v The Attorney General of Trinidad and Tobago (Trinidad and Tobago) | [2016] UKPC 17 | |
| Wright v The Queen (Cayman Islands) | [2016] UKPC 18 | |
| Cassell and another v The Queen (Montserrat) | [2016] UKPC 19 | |
| Mascareignes Sterling Co Ltd v Chang Cheng Esquares Co Ltd (Mauritius) | [2016] UKPC 21 | |
| Bahamas Oil Refining Company International Limited v The Owners of the Cape Bari Tankschiffahrts GMBH & Co KG (Bahamas) | [2016] UKPC 20 | |
| The Superintendent of Prisons and another v Hamilton (Anguilla) | [2016] UKPC 23 | |
| Recreational Holdings 1 (Jamaica) Ltd v Lazarus (Jamaica) | [2016] UKPC 22 | |
| Cenac and others v Schafer (Saint Lucia) | [2016] UKPC 25 | |
| Oliveira v The Attorney General (Antigua and Barbuda) | [2016] UKPC 24 | |
| Janin Caribbean Construction Limited v Wilkinson and another (as executors of the estate of Ernest Clarence Wilkinson) and another (Grenada) | [2016] UKPC 26 | |
| The Attorney General v Hall (Bahamas) | [2016] UKPC 28 | |
| Commissioner of Customs v Delta Petroleum (Caribbean) Limited (British Virgin Islands) | [2016] UKPC 27 | |
| Shavargo McPhee v The Queen (Bahamas) | [2016] UKPC 29 | |
| Madhewoo v The State of Mauritius and another (Mauritius) | [2016] UKPC 30 | |
| Tex Services Ltd v Shibani Knitting Co Ltd (In Receivership) (Mauritius) | [2016] UKPC 31 | |
| Singularis Holdings Ltd v Price Waterhouse Coopers (Bermuda) | [2016] UKPC 33 | |
| PricewaterhouseCoopers v SAAD Investments Company Limited (In Official Liquidation) (Bermuda) | [2016] UKPC 33 | |
| PricewaterhouseCoopers v SAAD Investments Company Limited (In Official Liquidation) and another (Bermuda) | [2016] UKPC 33 | |
| Arorangi Timberland Limited and others v Minister of the Cook Islands National Superannuation Fund (Cook Islands) | [2016] UKPC 32 | |
| Smith (Personal Representative of Hugh Smith (Deceased)) and others v Molyneaux (British Virgin Islands) | [2016] UKPC 35 | |
| Arawak Homes Limited v The Attorney General and another (Bahamas) | [2016] UKPC 34 | |
| Scatliffe v Scatliffe (British Virgin Islands) | [2016] UKPC 36 | |
| Barrow v Attorney General of Saint Lucia (Saint Lucia) | [2016] UKPC 38 | |
| Sam Maharaj v Prime Minister (Trinidad and Tobago) | [2016] UKPC 37 | |

=== 2017 ===
| Case name | Citation | Subject |
|---|---|---|
| McLeod v The Queen (Jamaica) | [2017] UKPC 1 | |
| Nazir Ali v Petroleum Company of Trinidad and Tobago (Trinidad and Tobago) | [2017] UKPC 2 | |
| Sandra Juman v The Attorney General of Trinidad and Tobago and another (Trinidad and Tobago) | [2017] UKPC 3 | |
| Grove Park Development Ltd v The Mauritius Revenue Authority and another (Mauritius) | [2017] UKPC 4 | |
| The Attorney General v Samuel Knowles Jnr and another (Bahamas) | [2017] UKPC 5 | |
| Neil Hernandez v The State (Trinidad and Tobago) | [2017] UKPC 6 | |
| Lester Pitman v The State (Trinidad and Tobago) | [2017] UKPC 6 | |
| Akita Holdings Limited v The Honourable Attorney General of The Turks and Caicos Islands (Turks and Caicos Islands) | [2017] UKPC 7 | |
| Junkanoo Estate Ltd and others v UBS Bahamas Ltd (In Voluntary Liquidation) (Bahamas) | [2017] UKPC 8 | |
| Archer and another v Fabian Investments Limited and others (Bahamas) | [2017] UKPC 9 | |
| Commodore Royal Bahamas Defence Force and others v Laramore (Bahamas) | [2017] UKPC 13 | |
| Attorney General v Dumas (Trinidad and Tobago) | [2017] UKPC 12 | |
| Cono Cono and Co Ltd v Veerasamy and others (Respondents and First and Third Co-Respondents) (Mauritius) | [2017] UKPC 11 | |
| Sun Alliance (Bahamas) Limited and another v Scandi Enterprises Limited (Bahamas) | [2017] UKPC 10 | |
| Scott v The Attorney General and another (Bahamas) | [2017] UKPC 15 | |
| Phillip v The Director of Public Prosecutions (St Christopher and Nevis) | [2017] UKPC 14 | |
| Keramuth (No 2) v The State of Mauritius (Mauritius) | [2017] UKPC 16 | |
| Sumodhee (No 3) v The State of Mauritius (Mauritius) | [2017] UKPC 16 | |
| Sumodhee (No 3) v The State of Mauritius (Mauritius) | [2017] UKPC 16 | |
| Marr v Collie (Bahamas) | [2017] UKPC 17 | |
| Lovelace v The Queen (St Vincent and the Grenadines) | [2017] UKPC 18 | |
| Miller and another v Miller and another (Jamaica) | [2017] UKPC 21 | |
| Jamaica Public Service Company Ltd v The All Island Electricity Appeal Tribunal and others (Jamaica) | [2017] UKPC 20 | |
| Pearson v Primeo Fund (Cayman Islands) | [2017] UKPC 19 | |
| Mediterranean Shipping Company SA v Sotramon Limited (Mauritius) | [2017] UKPC 23 | |
| University of Technology, Jamaica v Industrial Disputes Tribunal and others (Jamaica) | [2017] UKPC 22 | |
| Rivnu Investment Limited and another v United Docks Limited and another (Mauritius) | [2017] UKPC 24 | |
| Sexius v The Attorney General of St Lucia (St Lucia) | [2017] UKPC 26 | |
| Lendore and others v The Attorney General of Trinidad and Tobago (Trinidad and Tobago) | [2017] UKPC 25 | |
| Chen v Ng (British Virgin Islands) | [2017] UKPC 27 | |
| Fair Trading Commission v Digicel Jamaica Limited and another (Jamaica) | [2017] UKPC 28 | |
| Mohammed v Public Service Commission and others (Trinidad and Tobago) | [2017] UKPC 31 | |
| Petroleum Company of Trinidad and Tobago Limited v Ryan and another (Trinidad and Tobago) | [2017] UKPC 30 | |
| Meadows and others v The Attorney General and others (Jamaica) | [2017] UKPC 29 | |
| Hurnam v The Attorney General and others (Mauritius) | [2017] UKPC 33 | |
| Dave Persad v Anirudh Singh (Trinidad and Tobago) | [2017] UKPC 32 | |
| Deslauriers and another v Guardian Asset Management Limited (Trinidad and Tobago) | [2017] UKPC 34 | |
| Rolle Family and Company Limited v Rolle (Bahamas) | [2017] UKPC 35 | |
| DD Growth Premium 2X Fund (In Official Liquidation) v RMF Market Neutral Strategies (Master) Limited (Cayman Islands) | [2017] UKPC 36 | |
| Fishermen and Friends of the Sea v The Minister of Planning, Housing and the Environment (Trinidad and Tobago) | [2017] UKPC 37 | |
| Cleare v The Attorney General and others (Bahamas) | [2017] UKPC 38 | |
| Hemery v Ramlogan (Mauritius) | [2017] UKPC 41 | |
| Paymaster (Jamaica) Limited v Grace Kennedy Remittance Services Limited and another (Jamaica) | [2017] UKPC 40 | |
| Paymaster (Jamaica) Limited and another v Grace Kennedy Remittance Services Limited (Jamaica) | [2017] UKPC 40 | |
| The Attorney General v River Dorée Holdings Limited (Saint Lucia) | [2017] UKPC 39 | |
| Staray Capital Limited and another v Cha, Yang (also known as Stanley) (British Virgin Islands) | [2017] UKPC 43 | |
| Alves v Attorney General of the Virgin Islands (British Virgin Islands) | [2017] UKPC 42 | |
| O'Connor (Senior) and others v The Proprietors, Strata Plan No. 51 (Turks and Caicos Islands) | [2017] UKPC 45 | |
| Whitlock and another v Moree (Bahamas) | [2017] UKPC 44 | |

=== 2018 ===
| Case name | Citation | Subject |
|---|---|---|
| Beau Songe Development Limited v The United Basalt Products Limited and another (Mauritius) | [2018] UKPC 1 | |
| Julien and others v Evolving Tecknologies and Enterprise Development Company Limited (Trinidad and Tobago) | [2018] UKPC 2 | |
| Almazeedi v Penner and another (Cayman Islands) | [2018] UKPC 3 | |
| A v R (Guernsey) | [2018] UKPC 4 | |
| Chandler v The State (Trinidad and Tobago) | [2018] UKPC 5 | |
| Central Broadcasting Services Ltd and another v The Attorney General of Trinidad and Tobago (Trinidad and Tobago) | [2018] UKPC 6 | |
| Rawlinson and Hunter Trustees SA and another v Investec Trust (Guernsey) Limited and another | [2018] UKPC 7 | |
| Investec Trust (Guernsey) Limited and another v Rawlinson and Hunter Trustees SA and another | [2018] UKPC 7 | |
| Investec Trust (Guernsey) Limited and others v Glenalla Properties Limited and others (Guernsey) | [2018] UKPC 7 | |
| Investec Trust (Guernsey) Limited and others v Rawlinson and Hunter Trustees SA (Guernsey) | [2018] UKPC 7 | |
| Investec Trust (Guernsey) Limited and another v Rawlinson and Hunter Trustees SA and another (Guernsey) | [2018] UKPC 7 | |
| Investec Trust (Guernsey) Limited and others v Rawlinson and Hunter Trustees SA (Guernsey) | [2018] UKPC 7 | |
| Investec Trust (Guernsey) Limited and others v Rawlinson and others (Guernsey) | [2018] UKPC 7 | |
| Investec Trust (Guernsey) Limited and others v Glenalla Properties Limited and others (Guernsey) | [2018] UKPC 7 | |
| Ramsook v Crossley (Trinidad and Tobago) | [2018] UKPC 9 | |
| Maharaj and another v Motor One Insurance Company Limited (Trinidad and Tobago) | [2018] UKPC 8 | |
| Sagicor Bank Jamaica Limited v Taylor-Wright (Jamaica) | [2018] UKPC 12 | |
| Honourable Attorney General and another v Isaac (Antigua and Barbuda) | [2018] UKPC 11 | |
| Guyah v Commissioner of Customs and another (Jamaica) | [2018] UKPC 10 | |
| De La Haye v Air Mauritius Ltd (Mauritius) | [2018] UKPC 14 | |
| Baptiste v Investment Managers Limited (Trinidad and Tobago) | [2018] UKPC 13 | |
| Al Sadik v Investcorp Bank BSC and others (Cayman Islands) | [2018] UKPC 15 | |
| Jacpot Ltd v Gambling Regulatory Authority (Mauritius) | [2018] UKPC 16 | |
| Browne v Munokoa and another (Cook Islands) | [2018] UKPC 18 | |
| Super Industrial Services Ltd and another v National Gas Company of Trinidad and Tobago Ltd (Trinidad and Tobago) | [2018] UKPC 17 | |
| Singh v Rainbow Court Townhouses Ltd (Trinidad and Tobago) | [2018] UKPC 19 | |
| Harding v Attorney General of Anguilla (Anguilla) | [2018] UKPC 22 | |
| Rangoonwala v Khan and others (British Virgin Islands) | [2018] UKPC 21 | |
| Gany Holdings (PTC) SA v Khan and others (British Virgin Islands) | [2018] UKPC 21 | |
| Warren v The State (Pitcairn Islands) | [2018] UKPC 20 | |
| The Honourable Chief Justice of Trinidad and Tobago Mr Justice Ivor Archie O.R.T.T. v The Law Association of Trinidad and Tobago (Trinidad and Tobago) | [2018] UKPC 23 | |
| Fishermen and Friends of the Sea v Environmental Management Authority and others (Trinidad and Tobago) | [2018] UKPC 24 | |
| University of Technology, Mauritius v Gopeechand (Mauritius) | [2018] UKPC 26 | |
| Bahamasair Holdings Limited v Messier Dowty Inc (Bahamas) | [2018] UKPC 25 | |
| Suppo v Jhundoo (Mauritius) | [2018] UKPC 29 | |
| Transpacific Export Services Ltd v The State and another (Mauritius) | [2018] UKPC 28 | |
| Bannerman Town, Millars and John Millars Eleuthera Association v Eleuthera Properties Ltd (Bahamas) | [2018] UKPC 27 | |
| Evans v The Queen (Bahamas) | [2018] UKPC 30 | |
| Davis v The Queen (Bahamas) | [2018] UKPC 30 | |
| Stubbs v The Queen (Bahamas) | [2018] UKPC 30 | |
| Boru Hatlari lle Petrol Taşima AŞ and others (also known as Botaş Petroleum Pipeline Corporation) v Tepe Inşaat Sanayii AŞ (Jersey) | [2018] UKPC 31 | |
| Long v Police Service Commission (Trinidad and Tobago) | [2018] UKPC 32 | |
| Bissonauth v Sugar Insurance Fund Board (Mauritius) | [2018] UKPC 33 | |

=== 2019 ===
| Case name | Citation | Subject |
|---|---|---|
| Nugent and another v Willers (Isle of Man) | [2019] UKPC 1 | |
| Meyer v Baynes (Antigua and Barbuda) | [2019] UKPC 3 | |
| Mexico Infrastructure Finance LLC v The Corporation of Hamilton (Bermuda) | [2019] UKPC 2 | |
| Cadet's Car Rentals and another v Pinder (Bahamas) | [2019] UKPC 4 | |
| Maharaj v National Energy Corporation of Trinidad and Tobago (Trinidad and Tobago) | [2019] UKPC 5 | |
| Attorney General of Trinidad and Tobago v Maharaj (Trinidad and Tobago) | [2019] UKPC 6 | |
| Seepersad (a minor) v Ayers-Caesar and others (Trinidad and Tobago) | [2019] UKPC 7 | |
| Director of Public Prosecutions v Jugnauth and another (Mauritius) | [2019] UKPC 8 | |
| Philomen Dean v Chanka Bhim (Trinidad and Tobago) | [2019] UKPC 10 | |
| Causwell v The General Legal Council (ex parte Elizabeth Hartley) (Jamaica) | [2019] UKPC 9 | |
| Layne v Attorney General of Grenada (Grenada) | [2019] UKPC 11 | |
| Maloo and others v Somar (Trinidad & Tobago) | [2019] UKPC 13 | |
| Jamaicans for Justice v Police Service Commission and another (Jamaica) | [2019] UKPC 12 | |
| Galantis v Alexiou and another (Bahamas) | [2019] UKPC 15 | |
| Francis and another v Vista Del Mar Developments Ltd (Cayman Islands) | [2019] UKPC 14 | |
| Sahatoo v The Attorney General of Trinidad and Tobago (Trinidad and Tobago) | [2019] UKPC 19 | |
| Singh v Public Service Commission (Trinidad and Tobago) | [2019] UKPC 18 | |
| Gunesh v The National Transport Corporation and another (Mauritius) | [2019] UKPC 17 | |
| Byron v Eastern Caribbean Amalgamated Bank (Antigua & Barbuda) | [2019] UKPC 16 | |
| Emmerson International Corporation v Renova Holding Ltd (British Virgin Islands) | [2019] UKPC 24 | |
| Angteeah v Bathfield and others (Mauritius) | [2019] UKPC 23 | |
| The Port Authority of Trinidad and Tobago v Daban (Trinidad and Tobago) | [2019] UKPC 22 | |
| Maharaj v Petroleum Company of Trinidad and Tobago Ltd (Trinidad and Tobago) | [2019] UKPC 21 | |
| UBS AG New York and others v Fairfield Sentry Ltd (In Liquidation) and others (British Virgin Islands) | [2019] UKPC 20 | |
| United Docks Ltd v De Spéville (Mauritius) | [2019] UKPC 28 | |
| The State of Mauritius and another v The (Mauritius) CT Power Limited and others (Mauritius) | [2019] UKPC 27 | |
| The State of Mauritius and another v The (Mauritius) CT Power Limited and others (Mauritius) | [2019] UKPC 27 | |
| Seukeran Singh v Commissioner of Police (Trinidad and Tobago) | [2019] UKPC 26 | |
| Bermuda Bar Council v Walkers (Bermuda) Limited (Bermuda) | [2019] UKPC 25 | |
| Volaw Trust and Corporate Services Ltd and its Directors and others v Her Majesty's Attorney General for Jersey (Jersey) | [2019] UKPC 29 | |
| Volaw Trust and Corporate Services Ltd and its Directors and others v The Office of the Comptroller of Taxes and another (Jersey) | [2019] UKPC 29 | |
| Ryan-Cox (on her own behalf and as representative of Theobalds Cox deceased) v Cox (as representative of Rhona aka Lorna Mary Cox) (St Lucia) | [2019] UKPC 32 | |
| Darroch v Her Majesty's Attorney General for the Isle of Man (Isle of Man) | [2019] UKPC 31 | |
| East Asia Company Ltd v PT Satria Tirtatama Energindo (Bermuda) | [2019] UKPC 30 | |
| Schulze Allen v Royal College of Veterinary Surgeons | [2019] UKPC 34 | |
| Bergan v Evans (St Christopher and Nevis) | [2019] UKPC 33 | |
| Almarales and others v Director of Personnel Administration and another (Trinidad and Tobago) | [2019] UKPC 35 | |
| Smart v Director of Personnel Administration and another (Trinidad and Tobago) | [2019] UKPC 35 | |
| Simon and others v Lyder and another (Trinidad and Tobago) | [2019] UKPC 38 | |
| AWH Fund Ltd (In Compulsory Liquidation) v ZCM Asset Holding Company (Bermuda) Ltd (Bahamas) | [2019] UKPC 37 | |
| Skandinaviska Enskilda Banken AB (Publ) v Conway and another (as Joint Official Liquidators of Weavering Macro Fixed Income Fund Ltd) (Cayman Islands) | [2019] UKPC 36 | |
| Seebun v Domun and others (Mauritius) | [2019] UKPC 39 | |
| C v C (Jersey) | [2019] UKPC 40 | |
| The Minister of Home Affairs and another v Barbosa (Bermuda) | [2019] UKPC 41 | |
| Mauritius Shipping Corporation Ltd v Employment Relations Tribunal and others (Mauritius) | [2019] UKPC 42 | |
| Canserve Ltd v The Republic of Trinidad and Tobago (Respondent)(Trinidad and Tobago) | [2019] UKPC 43 | |
| Nurse v Republic of Trinidad and Tobago (Trinidad and Tobago) | [2019] UKPC 43 | |
| Attorney General of Trinidad & Tobago v Ayers-Caesar (Trinidad & Tobago) | [2019] UKPC 44 | |
| In the matter of Stanford International Bank Ltd (In Liquidation) (Acting by and through its Joint Liquidators Mark McDonald and Hugh Dickson) | [2019] UKPC 45 | |
| Mohammed v Gomez and others (Trinidad and Tobago) | [2019] UKPC 46 | |
| Peepul Capital Fund II LLC and another v Vsoft Holdings LLC (Mauritius) | [2019] UKPC 47 | |
| De Zwarte Band and another v Kanhai and another (Trinidad and Tobago) | [2019] UKPC 48 | |

=== 2020 ===
| Case name | Citation | Subject |
|---|---|---|
| Attorney General of St Helena v AB and others (St Helena) | [2020] UKPC 1 | |
| Saunders v The Queen (Bahamas) | [2020] UKPC 4 | |
| Pearson (in his capacity as Additional Liquidator of Herald Fund SPC (in Official Liquidation)) v Primeo Fund (in Official Liquidation) (Cayman Islands) | [2020] UKPC 3 | |
| Shanda Games Ltd v Maso Capital Investments Ltd and others (Cayman Islands) | [2020] UKPC 2 | |
| Shanda Games Ltd v Maso Capital Investments Ltd and others (Cayman Islands) | [2020] UKPC 2 | |
| Magner and another v Royal Bank of Scotland International Ltd (Gibraltar) | [2020] UKPC 5 | |
| Elefterescu v The Royal College of Veterinary Surgeons | [2020] UKPC 6 | |
| Ramadhar v Ramadhar and others (Trinidad and Tobago) | [2020] UKPC 7 | |
| The Queen v Vasyli (Bahamas) | [2020] UKPC 8 | |
| Blackburn v LIAT (1974) Ltd (Antigua and Barbuda) | [2020] UKPC 9 | |
| Bain v The Queen (Bahamas) | [2020] UKPC 10 | |
| Chief Fire Officer and another v Felix-Phillip and others (Trinidad and Tobago) | [2020] UKPC 12 | |
| Commissioner of the Independent Commission of Investigations v Police Federation and others (Jamaica) | [2020] UKPC 11 | |
| Dave Lewin (Director of Complaints of the Independent Commission of Investigations) v Diah and others (Jamaica) | [2020] UKPC 11 | |
| The Minister of Energy and Energy Affairs v Maharaj and another (Trinidad & Tobago) | [2020] UKPC 13 | |
| Lovering and another v Atkinson and others (Guernsey) | [2020] UKPC 14 | |
| Williams v The Supervisory Authority (Antigua & Barbuda) | [2020] UKPC 15 | |
| Director of Public Prosecutions v Seeburrun (Mauritius) | [2020] UKPC 16 | |
| Director of Public Prosecutions v Lagesse (Mauritius) | [2020] UKPC 16 | |
| Lares v Lares and others (Trinidad & Tobago) | [2020] UKPC 19 | |
| Attorney General of the Virgin Islands v Global Water Associates Ltd (British Virgin Islands) | [2020] UKPC 18 | |
| Chief Personnel Officer v Amalgamated Worker's Union (Trinidad & Tobago) | [2020] UKPC 17 | |
| Presidential Insurance Company Ltd v Twitz and another (Trinidad & Tobago) | [2020] UKPC 20 | |
| Ciban Management Corporation v Citco (BVI) Ltd and another (British Virgin Islands) | [2020] UKPC 21 | Duomatic principle |
| Chu v Lau (British Virgin Islands) | [2020] UKPC 24 | |
| Delta Petroleum (Caribbean) Ltd v British Virgin Islands Electricity Corporation (British Virgin Islands) | [2020] UKPC 23 | |
| Webb v Webb (Cook Islands) | [2020] UKPC 22 | |
| The Airport Authority v Western Air Ltd (The Bahamas) | [2020] UKPC 29 | |
| Crick and another v Brown (Trinidad & Tobago) | [2020] UKPC 32 | |
| Philip v Commissioner of Police and another (T & T) | [2020] UKPC 32 | |
| Livingston Properties Equities Inc and others v JSC MCC Eurochem and another (British Virgin Islands) | [2020] UKPC 31 | Duomatic principle |
| Attorney General of the Turks and Caicos Islands v Misick and others | [2020] UKPC 30 | |
| Ally Khan v Abdool (No 2) (Mauritius) | [2020] UKPC 28 | |
| Ally Khan v Abdool (Mauritius) | [2020] UKPC 28 | |
| The Queen v Evans (Bahamas) | [2020] UKPC 27 | |
| Stubbs v The Queen (Bahamas) | [2020] UKPC 27 | |
| Davis v The Queen (Bahamas) | [2020] UKPC 27 | |
| Yearwood v Yearwood (Antigua & Barbuda) | [2020] UKPC 26 | |
| National Stadium Project (Grenada) Corporation v NH International (Caribbean) Ltd (Trinidad & Tobago) | [2020] UKPC 25 | |
| Samsoondar v Capital Insurance Ltd (Trinidad and Tobago) | [2020] UKPC 33 | |

=== 2021 ===
| Case name | Citation | Subject |
|---|---|---|
| Ming Siu Hung and others v J F Ming Inc and another (British Virgin Islands) | [2021] UKPC 1 | |
| Dass v Marchand and others (Trinidad and Tobago) | [2021] UKPC 2 | |
| Friedland v Hickox (Anguilla) - Judicial Committee of the Privy Council | [2021] UKPC 3 | |
| Powell v Spence (Jamaica) - Judicial Committee of the Privy Council | [2021] UKPC 5 | |
| Byers and others v Ningning (British Virgin Islands) - Judicial Committee of the Privy Council | [2021] UKPC 4 | |
| Betaudier v Attorney General of Trinidad and Tobago (Trinidad and Tobago) | [2021] UKPC 7 | |
| Pickle Properties Ltd v Plant (British Virgin Islands) | [2021] UKPC 6 | |
| Hinds and others v Director of Public Prosecutions (Jamaica) | [2021] UKPC 10 | |
| Silly Creek Estate and Marina Co Ltd v Attorney General Turks and Caicos Islands | [2021] UKPC 9 | |
| RAV Bahamas Ltd and another v Therapy Beach Club Incorporated (Bahamas) | [2021] UKPC 8 | |
| FundHaven Limited and another v The Executive Director of the Securities Commission of the Bahamas (Bahamas) | [2021] UKPC 11 | |
| Brandt v Commissioner of Police and others (Montserrat) | [2021] UKPC 12 | |
| Commissioner of Prisons and another v Seepersad and another (Trinidad and Tobago) | [2021] UKPC 13 | |
| Pleshakov v Sky Stream Corporation and others (British Virgin Islands) | [2021] UKPC 15 | |
| Betamax Ltd v State Trading Corporation (Mauritius) | [2021] UKPC 14 | |
| Clarke and others v The State (Trinidad and Tobago) | [2021] UKPC 16 | |
| Kerzner International Mauritius Holdings Ltd v Assessment Review Committee and another | [2021] UKPC 18 | |
| Duncan and Jokhan v Attorney General of Trinidad and Tobago | [2021] UKPC 17 | |
| Knowles and others v The Superintendent of Her Majesty's Fox Hill Prison (The Commissioner, Bahamas Department of Correctional Services) and others (The Bahamas) | [2021] UKPC 19 | |
| Royal Cayman Islands Police Association and others v Commissioner of the Royal Cayman Islands Police Service and another (Cayman Islands) | [2021] UKPC 21 | |
| Primeo Fund (in Official Liquidation) v Bank of Bermuda (Cayman) Ltd and another | [2021] UKPC 22 | |
| Harvey and another v Brette and others | [2021] UKPC 23 | |
| Gordon v Havener (Antigua & Barbuda) | [2021] UKPC 26 | |
| Hurhangee v Ramsawhook and others (Mauritius) | [2021] UKPC 25 | |
| Convoy Collateral Ltd v Broad Idea (British Virgin Islands) | [2021] UKPC 24 | |
| Convoy Collateral Ltd v Cho Kwai Chee (also known as Cho Kwai Chee Roy) (British Virgin Islands) | [2021] UKPC 24 | |
| Maharaj and others v The State (Trinidad and Tobago) | [2021] UKPC 27 | |
| Maharaj and others v The State (Trinidad and Tobago) | [2021] UKPC 27 | |
| Hosein v Ramnarine-Hill (Trinidad & Tobago) | [2021] UKPC 28 | |
| Sookhan v The Children's Authority of Trinidad and Tobago (Trinidad and Tobago) | [2021] UKPC 29 | |
| Charles B Lawrence & Associates v Intercommercial Bank Ltd (Trinidad & Tobago) | [2021] UKPC 30 | |
| GibFibre Ltd (trading as GibFibre Speed) v Gibraltar Regulatory Authority (Gibraltar) | [2021] UKPC 31 | |
| Flashbird Ltd v Compagnie de Securite Privee et Industrielle SARL (Mauritius) | [2021] UKPC 32 | |
| Integrity Commission v Kikivarakis (as official liquidator TCI Bank Ltd (in liquidation)) (Turks and Caicos Islands) | [2021] UKPC 33 | |

=== 2022 ===
| Case name | Citation | Subject |
|---|---|---|
| Public Service Commission v Richards (Trinidad & Tobago) | [2022] UKPC 1 | |
| Ciel Ltd and another v Central Water Authority (Mauritius) | [2022] UKPC 2 | |
| Momin v February Point Resort Estates Ltd (Bahamas) | [2022] UKPC 3 | |
| Framhein v Attorney General of the Cook Islands (sued on behalf of the Crown) (Cook Islands) | [2022] UKPC 4 | |
| Framhein v Attorney General of the Cook Islands (sued on behalf of the Crown) (Cook Islands) | [2022] UKPC 4 | |
| First Caribbean International Bank (Barbados) Ltd and another v Interested Creditors (Saint Lucia) | [2022] UKPC 7 | |
| Day and another v The Government of the Cayman Islands and another (Cayman Islands) | [2022] UKPC 6 | |
| Attorney General for Bermuda v Ferguson and others (Bermuda) | [2022] UKPC 5 | |
| Indra Williams v Casepak Company (Grenada) Ltd (t/a Calabash Hotel) (Grenada) | [2022] UKPC 9 | |
| Prickly Bay Waterside Limited v British American Insurance Company Limited (Grenada) | [2022] UKPC 8 | |
| Lescene Edwards v The Queen (Jamaica) | [2022] UKPC 11 | |
| Nature Resorts Ltd (Appellant/Cross-respondent) v First Citizens Bank Ltd (Respondent/Cross-appellant) (Trinidad & Tobago) | [2022] UKPC 10 | |
| Enal v Singh and others (Trinidad & Tobago) | [2022] UKPC 13 | |
| Devon Hewey v The Queen (Bermuda) | [2022] UKPC 12 | |
| Gem Management Ltd v Firefox Ltd and others (Mauritius) | [2022] UKPC 17 | |
| Energizer Supermarket Ltd v Holiday Snacks Ltd (Trinidad & Tobago) | [2022] UKPC 16 | |
| Dr Kongsheik Achong Low v Brian Lezama (Administrator of the Estate of Karen Lezama, Deceased) (Trinidad and Tobago) | [2022] UKPC 15 | |
| Ma v Wong and others (British Virgin Islands) | [2022] UKPC 14 | |
| Royal Bank of Scotland International Ltd v JP SPC 4 and another (Isle of Man) | [2022] UKPC 18 | |
| Boodram (Respondent/Cross-appellant) v Attorney General of Trinidad and Tobago (Appellant/Cross-respondent) (Trinidad and Tobago) | [2022] UKPC 20 | |
| Jay Chandler v The State (Trinidad and Tobago) | [2022] UKPC 19 | |
| Gol Linhas Aereas S.A (formerly VRG Linhas Aereas S.A.) v MatlinPatterson Global Opportunities Partners (Cayman) II L.P. and others (Cayman Islands) | [2022] UKPC 21 | |
| St Nicholas Grammar School Ltd v Sylvie Arnulphy and another (Mauritius) | [2022] UKPC 23 | |
| La Brea Environs Protectors v The Petroleum Company of Trinidad and Tobago (Petrotrin) and another (Trinidad and Tobago) | [2022] UKPC 22 | |
| SR Projects Ltd v Rampersad, the Liquidator of the Hindu Credit Union Co-Operative Society on behalf of the Hindu Credit Union Co-Operative Society Ltd (Trinidad and Tobago) | [2022] UKPC 24 | |
| MacKenzie Frank and another v Attorney General of Antigua and Barbuda (Antigua and Barbuda) | [2022] UKPC 25 | |
| Satyanand Maharaj v Attorney General of Trinidad and Tobago (Trinidad and Tobago) | [2022] UKPC 26 | |
| Suraj and others v Attorney General of Trinidad and Tobago | [2022] UKPC 26 | |
| Smith and another v Attorney General of Trinidad & Tobago and others (Trinidad & Tobago) | [2022] UKPC 28 | |
| Ennismore Consulting Ltd v Fenris Consulting Ltd (Cayman Islands) | [2022] UKPC 27 | |
| Jesus Alexander Rodriguez Martinez (by his kin and next friend Luisa Del Valle Martinez Hernandez) and another v Chief Immigration Officer (Trinidad and Tobago) | [2022] UKPC 29 | |
| Mohan Jogie v Angela Sealy (Trinidad and Tobago) | [2022] UKPC 32 | |
| Michael Paul Chen-Young and others v Eagle Merchant Bank Jamaica Ltd and 3 others (Jamaica) | [2022] UKPC 30 | |
| Attorney General of Trinidad and Tobago v Akili Charles No 2 (Trinidad and Tobago) | [2022] UKPC 31 | |
| Estate of Dame Bernice Lake QC (Deceased) and another v Attorney General of Anguilla (Anguilla) | [2022] UKPC 33 | |
| Estate of Dame Bernice Lake QC (Deceased) v Attorney General of Anguilla (Anguilla) | [2022] UKPC 33 | |
| Glory Trading Holding Ltd v Global Skynet International Ltd and another (Anguilla) | [2022] UKPC 35 | |
| Emlyn Quashie (Administrator Pendente Lite of the Estate of the Deceased Beresford Solomon) v Ayana Solomon (Trinidad & Tobago) | [2022] UKPC 34 | |
| ITG Ltd and others v Fort Trustees Ltd and another (Guernsey) | [2022] UKPC 36 | |
| Equity Trust (Jersey) Ltd v Halabi (in his capacity as Executor of the Estate of the late Madam Intisar Nouri) (Jersey) | [2022] UKPC 36 | |
| The Central Bank of Trinidad and Tobago v Maritime Life (Caribbean) Ltd (Trinidad and Tobago) | [2022] UKPC 37 | |
| Roopchand v Tesheira (The Executrix of the Estate of Russell Tesheira) (Trinidad and Tobago) | [2022] UKPC 38 | |
| Gulf View Medical Centre Ltd v Tesheira (The Executrix of the Estate of Russell Tesheira) (Trinidad and Tobago) | [2022] UKPC 38 | |
| CMK BWI Ltd and 7 others v Attorney General of the Turks and Caicos Islands (on behalf of the Crown and Government of the Turks and Caicos Islands) (Turks and Caicos Islands) | [2022] UKPC 40 | |
| A&A Mechanical Contractors and Company Ltd v Petroleum Company of Trinidad & Tobago (Trinidad & Tobago) | [2022] UKPC 39 | |
| Flora Moses (adminixstratrix pendente lite of the estate of Jude Moses aka Julie Moses, deceased) v Selwyn Moses (Trinidad and Tobago) | [2022] UKPC 42 | |
| Sancus Financial Holdings Ltd and others v Holm and another (British Virgin Islands) | [2022] UKPC 41 | |
| Dawn Satterswaite and 2 others v Bobbette Smalling (Jamaica) | [2022] UKPC 44 | |
| Jack Austin Warner v Attorney General of Trinidad and Tobago | [2022] UKPC 43 | |
| Katic v Republic of Croatia (Gibraltar) | [2022] UKPC 45 | |
| Philip Brelsford and 3 others v Providence Estate Ltd and another (Montserrat) | [2022] UKPC 46 | |
| Phyliss Rampersad and another v Deo Ramlal and 3 others (Trinidad and Tobago) | [2022] UKPC 50 | |
| Attorney General of Trinidad and Tobago v Akili Charles (Trinidad and Tobago) | [2022] UKPC 49 | |
| Sagicor Bank Jamaica Ltd v YP Seaton (Jamaica) | [2022] UKPC 48 | |
| Grand View Private Trust Company and another v Wen-Young Wong and others (no 2) (Bermuda); | [2022] UKPC 47 | |
| Grand View Private Trust Company and another v Wen-Young Wong and others (Bermuda); | [2022] UKPC 47 | |
| Kevin Stuart v Attorney General of Trinidad and Tobago (Trinidad and Tobago) | [2022] UKPC 53 | |
| Kwok Kin Kwok v Yao Juan (British Virgin Islands) | [2022] UKPC 52 | |
| Jean-Rony Jean Charles v The Honourable Carl Bethel (in his capacity as Attorney General of the Bahamas) and 3 others (Bahamas) | [2022] UKPC 51 | |
| Attorney General of Trinidad and Tobago v JM (A minor by his kin and next Friend NM) (Trinidad and Tobago) | [2022] UKPC 54 | |
| Water and Sewerage Authority of Trinidad and Tobago v Darwin Azad Sahadath and another (Trinidad and Tobago) | [2022] UKPC 56 | |
| Robert Gormandy and 2 others v Trinidad and Tobago Housing Development Corporation (Trinidad and Tobago) | [2022] UKPC 55 | |
| C-Care (Mauritius) Ltd v Employment Relations Tribunal and 5 others (Mauritius) | [2022] UKPC 58 | |
| Dr Ramraj Deonarine and 4 others v Lauralee Ramcharan (Trinidad and Tobago) | [2022] UKPC 57 | |

=== 2023 ===
| Case name | Citation | Subject |
|---|---|---|
| Traille Caribbean Ltd v Cable & Wireless Jamaica Ltd (Trading as Lime) (Jamaica) | [2023] UKPC 19 | |
| Carriacou Devcor Ltd v Margaret Corion and another (the Personal Representatives of the Estate of Samuel Corion, Deceased) (Grenada) | [2023] UKPC 1 | |
| Responsible Development for Abaco (RDA) Ltd v The Right Honourable Perry Christie and others (Bahamas) | [2023] UKPC 2 | |
| Lux Locations Ltd v Yida Zhang (Antigua and Barbuda) | [2023] UKPC 3 | |
| Malik Cox v The King (Turks and Caicos Islands) | [2023] UKPC 4 | |
| Chandra Silochan and another v Rickie Cedeno (Trinidad and Tobago) | [2023] UKPC 5 | |
| The Attorney General and another v The Jamaican Bar Association (Jamaica) | [2023] UKPC 6 | |
| The General Legal Council and another v The Jamaican Bar Association (Jamaica) | [2023] UKPC 6 | |
| HEB Enterprises Ltd and another v Bernice Richards (as Personal Representative of the Estate of Anthony Richards, Deceased) (Cayman Islands) | [2023] UKPC 7 | |
| Justin Ramoon v Governor of the Cayman Islands and another (Cayman Islands) | [2023] UKPC 9 | |
| Dorsey McPhee v Colina Insurance Ltd (Bahamas) | [2023] UKPC 8 | |
| James Miller v The King (Bahamas) | [2023] UKPC 10 | |
| Charles Edward Porter and another v Robert Stokes (Personal Representative of the Estate of Walter Edward Stokes, deceased) (Trinidad and Tobago) | [2023] UKPC 11 | |
| Douglas Ngumi v The Attorney General of The Bahamas and 3 others (Bahamas) | [2023] UKPC 12 | |
| Attorney General v Shannon Tyreck Rolle and 4 others (Bahamas) | [2023] UKPC 13 | |
| Tafari Morrison v The King (Jamaica) | [2023] UKPC 14 | |
| Rodriguez Jean Pierre v The King (Bahamas) | [2023] UKPC 15 | |
| Lea Lilly Perry and another v Lopag Trust Reg and another No 2 (Cayman Islands) | [2023] UKPC 16 | |
| Ravi Balgobin Maharaj v The Cabinet of the Republic of Trinidad and Tobago and another (Trinidad and Tobago) | [2023] UKPC 17 | |
| Vinson Ariste v The King (Bahamas) | [2023] UKPC 18 | |
| Alphamix Ltd v The District Council of Riviere du Rempart (Mauritius) | [2023] UKPC 20 | |
| Robert Tantular v His Majesty's Attorney General (Jersey) | [2023] UKPC 21 | |
| Tan Chi Fang and 3 others v His Majesty's Attorney General (Jersey) No 2 | [2023] UKPC 21 | |
| Tan Chi Fang and 3 others v His Majesty's Attorney General (Jersey) | [2023] UKPC 21 | |
| Ernest Hilaire v Allen Chastanet (Saint Lucia) | [2023] UKPC 22 | |
| The Permanent Secretary, Ministry of Social Development and Family Services and another v Ruth Peters (Trinidad & Tobago) | [2023] UKPC 23 | |
| Blue Lagoon Beach Hotel & Co Ltd v Assessment Review Committee and another (Mauritius) | [2023] UKPC 24 | |
| Ray Morgan v The King (Jamaica) | [2023] UKPC 25 | |
| The Chairman of the Board of Inland Revenue v Finbar Boland and 15 others (Trinidad and Tobago) | [2023] UKPC 27 | |
| Attorney General of Trinidad and Tobago v Trinsalvage Enterprises Ltd (Trinidad & Tobago) | [2023] UKPC 26 | |
| Caryn Moss v The King (Bahamas) | [2023] UKPC 28 | |
| Matadai Roopnarine v Attorney General of Trinidad and Tobago (Trinidad and Tobago) | [2023] UKPC 30 | |
| Winston Finzi v Jamaican Redevelopment Foundation Inc. and others (Jamaica) | [2023] UKPC 29 | |
| Sassy Garcia v Arima Door Centre Holding Company Ltd (Trinidad and Tobago) | [2023] UKPC 31 | |
| Roger Watson v The King (Bahamas) | [2023] UKPC 32 | |
| FamilyMart China Holding Co Ltd v Ting Chuan (Cayman Islands) Holding Corporation (Cayman Islands) | [2023] UKPC 33 | |
| Rollin Clifton Bertrand and 2 others v Anthony Elias (Trinidad and Tobago) | [2023] UKPC 34 | |
| Stanford Asset Holdings Ltd and another v AfrAsia Bank Ltd (Mauritius) | [2023] UKPC 35 | |
| Attorney General of Trinidad and Tobago v Vijay Maharaj Substituted on behalf of the Estate of Satnarayan Maharaj for Satnarayan Maharaj and another (Trinidad and Tobago) | [2023] UKPC 36 | |
| Surendra Dayal v Pravind Kumar Jugnauth and 7 others (Mauritius) | [2023] UKPC 37 | |
| Michel Lafresiere v New Mauritius Hotels Ltd (Mauritius) | [2023] UKPC 38 | |
| Renraw Investments Ltd and 2 others v Real Time Systems Ltd (Trinidad & Tobago) | [2023] UKPC 39 | |
| Primeo Fund (in Official Liquidation) v Bank of Bermuda (Cayman) Ltd and another | [2023] UKPC 40 | |
| Anthony Henry and another v Attorney General of St Lucia | [2023] UKPC 41 | |
| Keith Arjoon and 2 others v Maria Daniel (Receiver) (Trinidad and Tobago) | [2023] UKPC 42 | |
| Francis Chitolie and Another v Saint Lucia National Housing Corporation | [2023] UKPC 43 | |
| Harold Chang v The Hospital Administrator and 2 others (Trinidad and Tobago) | [2023] UKPC 44 | |

== See also ==
- List of High Court of Australia cases
- List of House of Lords cases
- List of Canadian appeals to the Judicial Committee of the Privy Council
- List of Supreme Court of Canada cases
