= Meates =

Meates is the surname of the following people:

- Bill Meates (rugby union) (1923–2003), New Zealand rugby union player
- William Meates (1875–1910), English football goalkeeper
- Kevin Meates (born 1930), New Zealand rugby union player
- Roly Meates, Ireland national rugby union team coach
- Liam Meates, Irish artist

== See also ==
- Meates v Attorney-General, a 1983 court case in New Zealand
