= Extraordinary general meeting =

Meeting at an irregular time

An extraordinary general meeting, commonly abbreviated as EGM, is a meeting of members of an organisation, shareholders of a company, or employees of an official body that occurs at an irregular time. The term is usually used where the group would ordinarily hold an annual general meeting (AGM) but where an issue arises that requires the input of the entire membership and is too serious or urgent to wait until the next AGM. Members and/or shareholders must be informed of the purpose of the EGM so that they may attend in a position where they can discuss and exercise intelligent judgment, or else any resolutions passed are invalid.

== Procedure ==
Before the EGM the board of the organisation will have agreed upon one or more resolutions that will be put to the shareholders or members for approval at the EGM. The wording of the resolution is sent to the shareholders with a note about its importance. The theory is that the board has a better knowledge of the situation, and the resolution is in effect their ideal solution, but it may not be in the interests of individual shareholders. Usually, the chairman of the EGM reads out and recommends the resolution to those present for approval, takes questions about the resolution from those present, supervises the vote and declares the result. The rules for conducting an EGM and the options for altering a resolution at an EGM or for taking proxy votes will vary from one organisation to another.

In some settings, this is known as a special general meeting or an emergency general meeting.

In the United Kingdom, the directors of a public company must convene an EGM if the net assets fall to half or less of the amount of its called-up share capital (section 656 of the Companies Act 2006). Shareholders who meet certain criteria can requisition a general meeting: within 21 days from the date of receipt of requisition, the directors must send out a notice to convene a meeting within 28 days after the date of giving the notice.

== Examples ==
Special general meeting:

- Faculty of Actuaries § Establishment of the Faculty of Actuaries
- Simon Fraser Student Society § Impeachment
- Institution of Engineering and Technology § Formation

== See also ==
- Duomatic principle
