= Commissioner of Inland Revenue =

Commissioner of Inland Revenue may refer to:

== Organizations ==
- Inland Revenue, or Board of Inland Revenue (United Kingdom)
- Inland Revenue Department (Hong Kong)
- Inland Revenue Department (New Zealand)

== Legal cases ==
- Commissioner of Inland Revenue v Challenge Corp Ltd
