= Royal Bank of Canada v R =

Canadian legal case

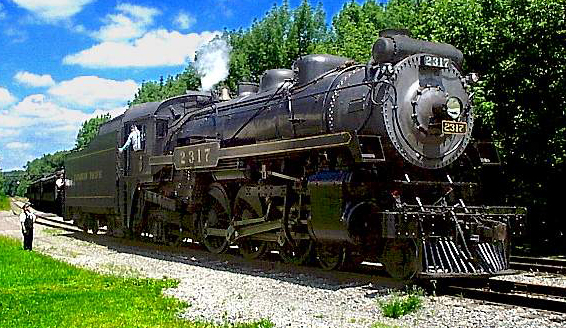
- Court: Judicial Committee of the Privy Council
- Full case name: The Royal Bank of Canada and others v The King and another
- Decided: 31 January 1913
- Citations: [1913] UKPC 1a, [1913] A.C. 283 (P.C.)

Case history
- Appealed from: Supreme Court of Alberta

Court membership
- Judges sitting: The Lord Chancellor, Lord Macnaghten, Lord Atkinson, Lord Moulton

Case opinions
- Decision by: The Lord Chancellor

Keywords
- property and civil rights, extraterritoriality

Royal Bank of Canada v R, is a notable Canadian constitutional decision of the Judicial Committee of the Privy Council where the Council limited the province's ability to create laws in relation to extraprovincial contractual rights.

== Background ==
In 1909, the Alberta and Great Waterways Railway Company was incorporated by an Act of the Legislative Assembly of Alberta. Another Act was passed in the same year to authorize the Province to guarantee the principal and interest of bonds that were to be issued by the Company. The proceeds of the bonds raised in England were credited to a Railway Special Account set up by the province and kept in a branch of the Royal Bank of Canada in Edmonton, and the Company proceeded to enter into a contract with the Canada West Construction Company.

In 1910, public uneasiness was raised concerning the arrangements that had been entered into by the Province, and a royal commission of inquiry was set up to look into the matter. While the commission was deliberating, a new government was formed that proceeded to pass two new Acts—the first authorizing the transfer of the balance in the Railway Special Account into the General Revenue Fund of the Province on the basis that the company had defaulted on the construction of the railway, and the second providing that anyone suffering loss or damage under the first Act must file a claim with the Government that would be reported to the Legislature. When the Provincial Treasurer arranged to issue a cheque to draw the balance out of the special account, the Royal Bank of Canada refused to honour it. The Province then proceeded to sue the Bank for the funds, and the two Companies were joined in the action as defendants.

== The courts below ==
At first instance, the District Court of Northern Alberta, Stuart J. ruled that the proceeds of the bond issue were within the Province, and therefore the matter was one of a local nature in it. Accordingly, the Act was validly passed and judgment was issued in favour of the Province.

The judgment was upheld by the Supreme Court of Alberta in a unanimous decision.

== Appeal to the Privy Council ==
Appeal was allowed by the Privy Council, which noted that the law in this field provided that the lenders in London were entitled to claim from the Bank at its head office in Montreal the money which they had advanced for a purpose that had ceased to exist. Therefore, this was a civil right that existed outside the Province of Alberta, and the Legislature of Alberta could not legislate validly against it.

== Aftermath ==
The absolute rule in Royal Bank of Canada v R has since been relaxed somewhat by Re Upper Churchill Water Rights Reversion Act to allow for incidental effects, where, as noted by McIntyre J.:

Where the pith and substance of the provincial enactment is in relation to matters which fall within the field of provincial legislative competence, incidental or consequential effects on extra-provincial rights will not render the enactment ultra vires. Where, however, the pith and substance of the provincial enactment is the derogation from or elimination of extra-provincial rights then, even if it is cloaked in the proper constitutional form, it will be ultra vires. A colourable attempt to preserve the appearance of constitutionality in order to conceal an unconstitutional objective will not save the legislation.

== See also ==
- List of Judicial Committee of the Privy Council cases
