= Takaro Properties Ltd v Rowling =

- Court: Judicial Committee of the Privy Council
- Full case name: Wallace Edward Rowling and The Attorney General v Takaro Properties Limited
- Decided: 30 November 1987
- Citation: [1987] UKPC 34
- Transcript: High Court judgment Court of Appeal judgment Privy Council ruling

Court membership
- Judges sitting: Lord MacKay of Clashfern, Lord Keith, Lord Brandon of Oakbrook, Lord Templeman, Lord Goff of Chieveley

Keywords
- negligence

Takaro Properties Limited v Rowling [1987] UKPC 34 is a cited case in New Zealand regarding negligence by the government

== Background ==
In 1968, Richard Rush, a wealthy businessman from the United States, purchased the 2,591 acre Takaro Station from the Crown, that borders Lake Te Anau with the plan to develop a luxury lodge for wealthy visitors from overseas. The development was financed by a $1 million loan guaranteed by Rush's father in law.

The lodge opened in 1970, but with an occupancy rate of less than 20%, the lodge closed in 1973. In the meantime, in 1971, Mr Rush's father in law died, resulting in the executor paying out the loan and seeking repayment by Takaro.

Due to the financial difficulties, Takaro sought to sell 90% of the shares to the Japanese company Mitsubishi, which planned to develop a golf course and up to 136 holiday homes.

However, at the time, under the Reserve Bank Act [1964] for such a foreign investor to be able to buy shares in a New Zealand company, it required the consent of the Minister of Finance. Bill Rowling, the finance minister at the time, refused to consent to the investment on the basis that he wanted the business to revert to a New Zealand owner.

Rush then requested Rowling to reconsider this decision on the basis that a refusal would cause severe financial hardship, but resulted in the same decision.

As a last result, Rush filed for a judicial review of Rowling's decision, with Wild CJ later ruling that Rowling had no legal right to consider reversion to New Zealand ownership in his decision, directing Rowling to reconsider his decision again.

By now however, as a result of the Yom Kippur War, a worldwide economic recession had begun to occur, causing Mitsubishi to reconsider whether to invest in a luxury lodge, and they ultimately pulled out of the deal.

Soon after, the lodge was placed into receivership and was sold.

Rush later sued Rowling in tort, claiming he was negligent in his decision making process.

In the High Court, his claim was dismissed by the judge, but on appeal to the Court of Appeal, it was overturned, being awarded $300,000 in damages. Rowling appealed to the Privy Council.

== Held ==
The Privy Council overturned the Court of Appeal judgment, ruling the minister had wider powers to make the decision than the Court of Appeal allowed, meaning that Rowling's decision at the time complied with the law.

== Legal Significance ==
This case makes it highly unlikely that a government minister could owe someone a duty of care. Whilst this case will often be contrasted with the case Meates v Attorney-General[1983] NZLR 308 where a Minister was held to owe a duty of care, this decision was made at the lower level of the Court of Appeal.
