= Subramaniam v Public Prosecutor =

1956 Privy Council case

Subramaniam v. Public Prosecutor, Judicial Committee of the Privy Council, 1 W.L.R. 965 (1956), is a leading Privy Council case that defined the scope of the hearsay rule. It was a case heard on appeal from the Supreme Court of the Federation of Malaya.

== Background ==
Subramaniam was charged with possession of ammunition for the purpose of helping a terrorist enemy, which would carry a sentence of death. He pleaded a defense of duress, claiming that he had no choice as the terrorists had threatened to kill him if he did not follow through with their requests. As part of the defense, he wanted to testify about these conversations he had with the terrorists.

At trial these conversations were found to be hearsay and excluded. On appeal the decision was overturned and the evidence was admitted on the basis that the conversation was not hearsay. Evidence is only hearsay if the purpose of submitting the evidence is to prove the contents of the statements were true - in this case, it did not matter that the statements were true, only that they were said to Subramaniam.

The issue for the Court was whether the testimony would constitute hearsay. The Privy Council held that the statements were not hearsay and allowed the appeal.

== Opinion of the Court ==
The Privy Council characterized the hearsay rule as follows:

Evidence of a statement made to a witness by a person who is not himself called as a witness may or may not be hearsay. It is hearsay and inadmissible when the object of the evidence is to establish the truth of what is contained in the statement. It is not hearsay and is admissible when it is proposed to establish by the evidence, not the truth of the statement, but the fact that it was made. The fact that the statement was made, quite apart from its truth, is frequently relevant in considering the mental state and conduct thereafter of the witness or of some other person in whose presence the statement was made.

The Council found that since the statements were not used in order to prove one of the issues of law, rather it was in order to prove whether the defendant was reasonable in his actions, the hearsay rule should not apply. The truth of the statements made by the terrorists were not significant, it is merely the fact that they said something that would create a reasonable apprehension in the defendant.

Notably, this case does not deal with an exception to the hearsay rule. Rather, the case deals with evidence which, despite being a statement made outside of the court room by another person, is not hearsay at all.

== Aftermath ==
The Council's characterization of the hearsay rule has since become the most often cited definition in the Commonwealth.

This articulation of the hearsay rule was adopted in Canada in the case of R. v. Wildman (1981), 60 CCC (2d) 289 (Ont CA).

It is unclear what ultimately happened to the accused.
