= Ciban Management Corporation v Citco (BVI) Ltd =

- Court: Judicial Committee of the Privy Council
- Full case name: Ciban Management Corporation v (1) Citco (BVI) Ltd, and (2) Tortola Corporation Company Ltd
- Decided: 30 July 2020
- Citation: [2020] UKPC 21 [2021] AC 122 [2020] 3 WLR 705 [2021] 1 All ER 983 [2021] 1 All ER (Comm) 1

Case history
- Appealed from: Ciban Management Corporation v Citco (BVI) Ltd, BVIHCVAP2013/0001 (Eastern Caribbean Supreme Court 13 November 2019).

Court membership
- Judges sitting: Lord Hodge; Lady Black; Lady Arden; Lord Leggatt; Lord Burrows

Case opinions
- Decision by: Lord Burrows

Keywords
- Duomatic principle; ostensible authority; directors' duties

Ciban Management Corporation v Citco (BVI) Ltd [2020] UKPC 21 is a decision of the Judicial Committee of the Privy Council on appeal from the British Virgin Islands relating to directors' duties and the legal rule known as the Duomatic principle.

The Privy Council dismissed the appeal, upholding the decisions of the judge at first instance and the Court of Appeal. They held that where the beneficial owner of a company set up a structure whereby the director of a company was to take instructions form a third party, and that third party subsequently acted in an unauthorised fashion, the company's director and registered agent did not breach any duties by acting in good faith on the instructions received in the usual way. In so doing the Privy Council made some important clarifications and extensions to the Duomatic principle. They also made some important legal clarifications in relation to directors' duties and the role of the registered agent, as well as expressing views on the proper application of certain statutory provisions.

== Facts ==
The Privy Council adopted the statement of facts as found by the Court of Appeal below:

Mr Byington was a Brazilian businessman. He carried on business through a company called Gravacôes Electricas SA ("GEL"), and he had loaned US$3m to GEL in order to keep it afloat. But by 1997 GEL was failing. Mr Byington was concerned about his US$3m, and he persuaded his longstanding friend and associate, Mr Costa, to assist him. They acquired two British Virgin Islands companies through Citco, a corporate services provider. Citco also arranged for one of their service companies, Tortola Corporation Company Ltd ("TCCL"), to act as director. The trial judge, Bannister J, found as a fact that Mr Byington had refused to sign any documents because he did not want anyone to find out, or even to be able to find out, that he owned Spectacular.

Mr Byington then purported to sell the shares in GEL to the first of the two companies which appeared to the world to be controlled by Mr Costa. "But the sale was a sham, for after its completion, unbeknownst to Mr Byington’s creditors, GEL in fact remained in Mr Byington’s beneficial ownership." Then, to get the valuable assets out, Mr Byington sued GEL for his $3m and secured a judicial sale of five of the six parcels of land which GEL owned. A public auction was held and the second company (Spectacular Holdings Inc, called "Spectacular" in the judgment), was the successful bidder. But Spectacular was beneficially owned by Mr Byington throughout, and it purchased the properties for R$2.75m. "In this way Mr Byington succeeded in taking the Property out of the reach of GEL’s creditors without anyone other than Mr Costa knowing that he had been the real purchaser of it." In relation to the judicial sale of the property and at various times subsequently, Spectacular issued powers of attorney authorizing Brazilian lawyers to take steps on behalf of the company. Mr Costa communicated the instructions to issue these powers of attorney to Citco and TCCL. Each time, his instructions were followed without question and the power of attorney was issued by TCCL as director on behalf of Spectacular.

By early 2000 Mr Byington was facing financial difficulties. He had borrowed US$85,000 from Mr Costa, and failed to repay that loan within the timeframe they had agreed. Mr Costa also appears to have been owed salary arrears. Despite reaching a settlement agreement, these debts remained unpaid and Mr Costa repeatedly complained to Mr Byington. Then, on 14 August 2001, without telling Mr Byington, Mr Costa sent an email to Citco containing the text of a draft power of attorney which he asked Spectacular to grant so as to authorise Mr Delollo (a Brazilian lawyer) to sell the property owned by Spectacular. Mr Costa sent the email from his personal email address and gave his home telephone number, but otherwise it was similar to previous instructions. The next day, TCCL passed a resolution providing for the issue of that fifth power of attorney and executed it. A copy of it was sent to Mr Costa. Mr Costa caused the invoice for Citco and TCCL's fees to be settled on 23 August 2001 by a transfer from his son's bank account in Oxford. On 20–21 November 2001 Mr Costa asked Citco to produce further documents in connection with the proposed sale, which it did.

On 14 December 2001 Spectacular entered a contract for the sale of the property at a price of R$1.15m with Mr Thomas Law as purchaser under the power of attorney. On that day Mr Costa also wrote to Mr Byington telling him for the first time what he had done, and giving a breakdown of the sums he said Mr Byington owed him. Mr Byington was not pleased, and his response made clear that he had not authorised the grant of the fifth power of attorney and was entirely unaware of the sale until then. He caused the fifth power of attorney, together with all the earlier powers of attorney, to be revoked. On 21 December 2001 he commenced proceedings in Brazil seeking to repudiate the sale agreement with the purchaser, Mr Law. This dispute was eventually settled by an agreement under which Spectacular retained the property in return for a payment to Mr Law of R$1.6m.

On 14 December 2007 Spectacular issued proceedings against Citco and TCCL. In summary, it alleged that TCCL had acted in breach of its tortious (and fiduciary) duty of care as a director in failing to ensure that Mr Costa had the authority to procure the grant of the fifth power of attorney and to try and sell the property, and that Citco had acted in breach of its tortious (and fiduciary) duty of care as a registered agent in failing to do the same and in supplying further documents for the sale. Spectacular also claimed that TCCL had acted in breach of a duty of care in relation to section 80 of the International Business Companies Act (now section 175 of the BVI Business Companies Act). The losses claimed by Spectacular included the moneys paid to Mr Law to settle the Brazilian proceedings; legal fees incurred by Spectacular in relation to the proceedings; and rent lost while title to the Property was disputed during those proceedings.

In June 2012 there was a statutory merger between Ciban Management Corp and Spectacular, and Ciban replaced Spectacular as the claimant in the proceedings. A trial limited to the issue of liability took place. On 27 November 2012 Bannister J gave judgment dismissing the claims. On 1 November 2018 (after a long delay attributed to loss of the court's file for the case), an appeal was heard by the Court of Appeal. On 13 February 2019 the Court of Appeal of the Eastern Caribbean Supreme Court gave judgment dismissing the appeal.

== The judgment ==
The unanimous decision of the Privy Council was handed down by Lord Burrows. After reviewing the facts, the Privy Council considered the central allegation made on behalf of the appellants, namely that Citco and TCCL had ignored "red flags" in relation to the instructions from Mr Costa in relation to the fifth and final power of attorney which was used in the attempt to sell the property. However, the Privy Council accepted the view of the judge at first instance that Mr Byington expected TCCL (and Citco) to follow the instructions of Mr Costa. They endorsed the first instance judgment that Mr Byington "remained in the shadows while Mr Costa communicated his instructions and was the point of contact". In so doing, the Privy Council agreed with the trial judge that Mr Byington "accepted the risk that Mr Costa might one day betray him".

=== "Red flags" ===
Lord Burrows first dealt with the "red flags" issue, that TCCL and Citco knew or ought to have known that Mr Costa was acting in an unauthorised fashion. In particular they relied upon the fact that he sent the e-mail from his personal account, that he asked for the invoice to be sent to him personally, and that he settled it out of his son's bank account. However, the Privy Council agreed with the trial judge that none of these things should have been expected to put the respondents on notice of anything untoward. In particular they stressed:

1. Citco and TCCL were aware - for example, from the refusal of Mr Byington to sign the management agreement in November 1997 - that Mr Byington wished to remain "in the shadows" albeit that he was the ultimate beneficial owner.
2. Over the course of two years, dealing with the four previous powers of attorney, Mr Byington had given Mr Costa actual authority to give instructions.
3. Mr Byington had not previously raised any complaints over those two years about the first four powers of attorney (and neither had Spectacular nor the US attorney holding the shares).

=== Duomatic principle ===
Lord Burrows indicated that it was thus reasonable for TCCL to rely on Mr Costa having ostensible authority to act on behalf of Mr Byington. But TCCL, as director, owed its duties to the company. Thus it was necessary to show that Mr Costa also had ostensible authority to act on behalf of the company (not just its beneficial owner). Accordingly, the Privy Council had to consider to what extent the tacit authority of Mr Byington constituted authorisation on behalf of Spectacular.

The Privy Council then gave detailed consideration to the area of law known as the Duomatic principle. They noted that under the principle, "the unanimous decision of all the shareholders in a solvent company about anything which the company under its memorandum of association has power to do shall be the decision of the company" (citing Multinational Gas and Petrochemical Co v Multinational Gas and Petrochemical Services Ltd [1983] Ch 258). The respondents argued that under the principle, the consent of Mr Byington should be treated as the consent of the company. He also cited the speech of Lord Hoffman in Meridian Global Funds Management Asia Ltd v Securities Commission [1995] 2 AC 500 at 506 in relation to how the Duomatic principle fits within the general rules on attribution in respect of a company.

==== Ostensible authority point ====
However, in previous cases relating to the Duomatic rule, the rule had normally been used to validate the express authority of an agent. In this case Mr Costa did not have express authority - he was acting under ostensible authority (or implied authority). There was no case asserting that implied authority could be approved in this manner by the shareholder. Lord Burrows swept this objection aside: "If actual authority can be conferred informally by unanimous shareholder consent the same should apply to ostensible authority".

Lord Burrows then noted that there were a number of limitations on the application of the Duomatic principle. Some of those limitations (principally, the requirement of solvency) were not relevant. But others were.

==== Actual knowledge ====
One of the cornerstones of the Duomatic principle is that the shareholder must know what it is that they are consenting to. In this case Mr Byington was completely unaware. However, Lord Burrows noted that it was wider than simple knowledge. He cited with approval the comments of Neuberger J in EIC Services Ltd v Phipps [2003] EWHC 1507 (Ch): "where the articles of a company require a course to be approved by a group of shareholders at a general meeting, that requirement can be avoided if all members of the group, being aware of the relevant facts, either give their approval to that course, or so conduct themselves as to make it inequitable for them to deny that they have given their approval." Lord Burrows felt that, even in the absence of express knowledge, it would be inequitable for Mr Byington to deny he had given approval: "Mr Byington should not be allowed to deny that he consented to the giving of authority to Mr Costa. By operating as he did, so as to keep his connection with Spectacular out of the picture, he was taking the risk that Mr Costa might betray him."

==== Dishonesty ====
The Privy Council noted that dishonesty is normally a bar to the application of the principle. It was alleged by Mr Byington that Mr Costa was dishonest in his actions, and that the court should not allow an agent to defraud the company. The appellants argued "it would be a 'remarkable extension' to the Duomatic principle to apply it to apparent authority so as to allow an agent to commit a fraud against the company and its members." But Lord Burrows disagreed with that analysis. He noted "neither Mr Byington nor TCCL was acting dishonestly in relation to that [power of attorney]. Put another way, the Duomatic principle would not be permitting the ultimate beneficial owner or the director to commit a fraud against the company." In other words, dishonesty on the part of an agent would not be relevant to the application of the principle - only the dishonesty of an "insider" like a director or shareholder. He also noted that the respondents rejected the allegation of dishonesty - Mr Costa was only trying to secure what was owed to him, and was turning over the surplus proceeds of sale to the company. The Privy Council did not make a finding in relation to that response.

==== Beneficial ownership point ====
The appellants argued that Mr Byington was not in fact the shareholder (although he was the ultimate beneficial owner). Legal title to the shares was vested in a US attorney who held the shares on behalf of Mr Byington. And only the legal holder has title to vote the shares. However, Lord Burrows referred to various cases where it was accepted that, in appropriate cases, the approval of the beneficial owner could be treated as the approval of the shareholders. In particular he cited Shahar v Tsitsekkos [2004] EWHC 2659 (Ch), Rolfe v Rolfe [2010] EWHC 244 (Ch) and Dickinson v NAL Realisations (Staffordshire) Ltd [2019] EWCA 2146.

==== Conclusion ====
Accordingly, in relation to the issues around the Duomatic principle, Lord Burrows held:

The conclusion to be reached is that the Duomatic principle did apply here. By reason of that principle, the ostensible authority conferred by Mr Byington counts as ostensible authority conferred by Spectacular. Spectacular cannot be allowed to deny that it authorised Mr Costa to give the instructions to TCCL.

=== Other issues ===
The Privy Council chose to briefly address certain other issues which had been argued in relation to the appeal.

==== Registered Agent's duties ====
The appellants had argued that Citco, as registered agent, was subject to a wide array of duties. Lord Burrows did not accept this. He noted the role of the registered agent was limited to various services. "Those services included providing ongoing company administration and could embrace accurately passing on relevant information and instructions from Mr Byington (as ultimate beneficial owner) to TCCL as director of the company. But those services were very limited", and nothing on the facts amounted to any breach of any duty of care in relation to those limited services by Citco. He also rejected the argument that Citco was a de facto director of the company.

==== Section 80 ====
The Privy Council indicated that it disagreed with the courts below when they indicated that the duty under section 80 of the International Business Companies Act (to seek shareholder consent) was a duty owed to the shareholder directly rather than a duty to the company. Lord Burrows also rejected the view expressed by the courts below that the grant of the power of attorney itself was not caught by the section 80 - the granting of the power of attorney was part and parcel of the sale of land process, and ought to have been approved.

The Privy Council also affirmed that the Duomatic principle generally applied to the giving of consent under section 80.

Finally, Lord Burrows rejected the view expressed by the courts below in relation to section 80 that, if a company was a single-purpose vehicle, then the sale of its only asset was necessarily "in the usual or regular course of the business carried on by the company". But he did not expand upon this point.

==== Directors' duties ====
Finally, Lord Burrows expressly rejected the contention that directors' duties under British Virgin Islands law imposes a lower standard of care on directors than is applicable under English law.

==== Propriety ====
Lastly he noted that "it has not been necessary for the Board to consider the propriety of that course of action" by Mr Byington setting up the structure in the way that he did. He accepted that there may be separate claims to be heard against Mr Costa, but he rejected the suggestion that the risk of Mr Costa's behaviour could be thrown onto the directors by acting in the way that he did. In such cases the courts would treat "the ultimate beneficial owner - Mr Byington in this case - as having been hoist by his own petard".

== Commentary ==
The decision has been handed down recently, and so as yet has attracted relatively little academic commentary. However, many of the comments made by the Privy Council in relation to the first instance decision were reflective of comments that textbook writers had previously made in relation to the original judgment.

== See also ==
- British Virgin Islands company law
