= Cukurova Finance International Ltd v Alfa Telecom Turkey Ltd =

British series of judicial decisions (2009–2014)

- Court: Judicial Committee of the Privy Council
- Full case name: Cukurova Finance International Ltd & Anor v Alfa Telecom Turkey Ltd
- Decided: 30 January 2013
- Citation: [2013] UKPC 2

Case history
- Prior actions: Cukurova Finance International Ltd & Anor, R (on the application of) v HM Treasury & Anor [2008] EWHC 2567 (Admin) (29 September 2005); Cukurova Finance International Ltd & Anor v. Alfa Telecom Turkey Ltd [2009] UKPC 19 (5 May 2009); Alfa Telecom Turkey Ltd v Cukurova Finance International Ltd et al, HCVAP 2009/001 (16 September 2009). Alfa Telecom Turkey Ltd v Cukurova Finance International Ltd et al, HCVAP 2008/012 (28 September 2009). Cukurova Finance International Ltd & Ors v Alfa Telecom Turkey Ltd [2012] UKPC 20 (23 May 2012)
- Appealed from: Alfa Telecom Turkey Ltd v Cukurova Finance International Ltd. Et al, HCVAP 2010/018, 2010/024 (Eastern Caribbean Supreme Court 20 July 2011).
- Subsequent actions: Cukurova Finance International Ltd & Anor v. Alfa Telecom Turkey Ltd [2013] UKPC 20 (9 July 2013); Cukurova Finance International Ltd & Anor v Alfa Telecom Turkey Ltd [2013] UKPC 25 (29 July 2013)

Court membership
- Judges sitting: Lord Neuberger; Lord Mance; Lord Kerr; Lord Clarke; Lord Sumption

Cukurova Finance International Ltd & Anor v Alfa Telecom Turkey Ltd [2009] UKPC 19 (5 May 2009), P.C. (on appeal from British Virgin Islands), [2012] UKPC 20 (23 May 2012), [2013] UKPC 2 (30 January 2013), [2013] UKPC 20 (9 July 2013), [2013] UKPC 25 (29 July 2013) and [2014] UKPC 15 (13 May 2014) were a series of judicial decisions of the Judicial Committee of the Privy Council, one of which ([2013] UKPC 2) is a leading case on the remedy of appropriation for security interests that was introduced into United Kingdom law under the Financial Collateral Arrangements (No.2) Regulations 2003, which implemented the Financial Collateral Arrangements Directive. Together with its related appeals on preliminary and subsequent issues, it has defined the scope of the remedy, as well as what equitable relief may be available.

The case came before the Privy Council on no less than six separate occasions. The case has been called "the British Virgin Islands equivalent of Jarndyce v Jarndyce".

== Background ==
=== Introduction of the appropriation remedy ===
Before 2003, English law provided that, other than the rules relating to self-dealing, there was no rule in equity which precluded a lender from stipulating for any collateral advantage, provided that the stipulation was not:

1. unfair or unconscionable,
2. in the nature of a penalty clogging the equity of redemption, or
3. inconsistent with or repugnant to the right to redeem.

As a result, for both legal and practical reasons, the use of foreclosure as a remedy has fallen into disuse. (Note: Foreclosure used to be a mortgagee’s primary remedy, but "it is now rarely sought or granted.") Even where a mortgagee seeks an order for foreclosure from the courts, the courts will frequently order judicial sale of the property instead.

In 2002, in an effort to standardize the rules relating to financial collateral arrangements (Note: Financial collateral was defined as cash or financial instruments.) and to "[provide] for rapid and non-formalistic enforcement procedures in order to safeguard financial stability and limit contagion effects in case of a default of a party to a financial collateral arrangement", the European Union adopted Directive 2002/47/EC, which provided for a remedy of appropriation (already available in the civil law). It also stated that those countries that did not allow such a remedy (i.e., the United Kingdom and the Republic of Ireland) on the Directive's adoption were not obliged to recognize it. All 25 EU member states advised that they would implement the provision, as it was seen as a significant component of the EU's Lisbon Strategy.

The Directive called for mandatory application to agreements between parties that were public sector bodies, supervised financial institutions, central counterparties, settlements and clearing houses. Member states were allowed to extend it to persons other than natural persons, provided that the other party to such agreements were one of the mandatory parties already covered. In its implementing Regulations, the United Kingdom opted to extend this remedy to all companies, provided that the arrangement in question allowed for the use of such remedy. (Note: Ireland opted to cover only the mandatory and optional entities contemplated in the Directive, in the European Communities (Financial Collateral Arrangements) Regulations (S.I. No. 1 of 2004). Signed on 5 January 2004. Statutory Instrument of the Government of Ireland. Retrieved from Irish Statute Book.)

=== Facts of the case ===
In September 2005, Çukurova Holding AS, a large Turkish company, through its subsidiary Cukurova Finance International Ltd ("CFI"), borrowed US$1.352 billion from Alfa Telecom Turkey Ltd ("ATT", part of the Russian Alfa Group). The debt was secured in part by an equitable mortgage, governed by English law, over CFI's 51% interest in a British Virgin Islands company that indirectly held a controlling interest in Turkcell, (Note: Turkcell İletişim Hizmetleri A.Ş.) the leading cellular network in Turkey. The facility agreement for the debt provided for appropriation to be an available remedy in the event of default.

In April 2007, ATT advised CFI that, in its view, there had been events of default under the agreement, and it demanded immediate repayment in full of the outstanding amount of the loan. CFI did not repay the full amount by the specified date, and ATT sent a letter to CFi stating that it had appropriated the pledged shares of the BVI company. CFI then gave five days' notice that it wished to pay the remaining amount owing under the agreement, which was accordingly tendered. ATT rejected the tender, CFI placed the funds in an escrow account, and litigation was commenced in the Eastern Caribbean Supreme Court.

== Preliminary issues ==
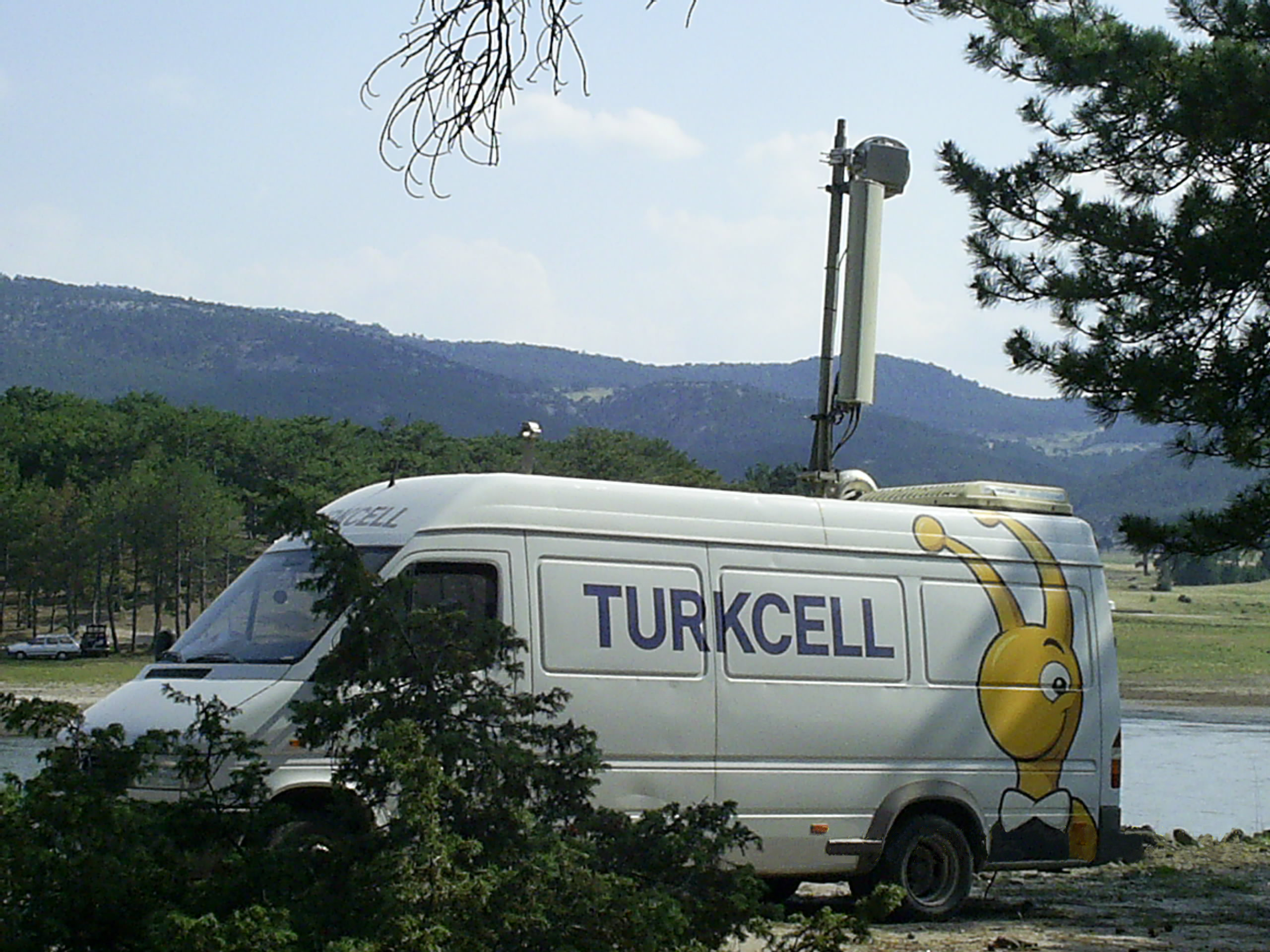
A Turkcell mobile base station.

=== Eastern Caribbean Supreme Court ===
The defendants raised a preliminary issue as to how a party validly exercised a right of appropriation in law. This preliminary issue would eventually be appealed all the way to the Privy Council, and was the first ever hearing in relation to how one exercised the right. Cukurova alleged that because the companies never updated their share registers to record a change of title to the shares, then no valid appropriation could have taken place.

In November 2007, after hearing opposing expert evidence on English law (which, in the BVI courts, is treated as foreign law) from Lord Millett and Professor Ross Cranston the BVI court held that Alfa had not in law validly appropriated the shares. The Eastern Caribbean Court of Appeal allowed Alfa's appeal in April 2008, concluding that it had lawfully appropriated the shares. Cukurova received permission to appeal the decision to the Privy Council.

=== At the Privy Council (2009) ===
In May 2009, the Board dismissed the appeal and ruled that, as a matter of English law:

1. Appropriation is much closer to sale than it is to foreclosure. It is in effect a sale by the collateral-taker to himself, at a price determined by an agreed valuation process.
2. It is not necessary, for a valid appropriation, for the collateral-taker to become a registered holder of the shares.
3. Commercial practicalities require that there should be an overt act evincing the intention to exercise a power of appropriation, communicated to the collateral-provider.

=== Administrative Court (England and Wales) ===
Separately, Cukurova applied to the English Administrative Court to seek permission to impugn the 2003 Regulations on the grounds that they were ultra vires the authority granted under the European Communities Act 1972, as they extended the Directive's application beyond its contemplated purpose. Permission was denied, as the Court held that there was little chance that the application would succeed:

[The Regulations] integrate the provisions of the Directive within existing provisions in domestic law, which regulates financial collateral arrangements without distinction as to personal scope. Were it not for the widened scope of the Regulations, two parallel but distinct systems would be in operation.

It was not possible for Cukurova to separately challenge the validity of the Regulations in the legal proceedings before the BVI courts because of the principle of the conflict of laws that the courts of one jurisdiction will not rule on the validity of laws in another jurisdiction under the act of state doctrine.

== Main judgment ==
=== Eastern Caribbean Supreme Court ===
Following the 2009 ruling, the matter where was returned to the British Virgin Islands commercial court where it came up for hearing before Justice Bannister QC, who held that no event of default had in fact occurred to justify the exercise by ATT of its remedies as secured creditor.

That decision was appealed and the Court of Appeal proceeded to consider the main appeal of the original trial judgment, with regard to:

- whether events of default had taken place, and
- whether any dealings had been done in bad faith.

It held that:

- an event of default had taken place, and it was enforced by a valid appropriation of shares,
- ATT was not guilty of any bad faith relating to the facility agreement.

Cukurova appealed the decision of the Court of Appeal, contending that:

1. they were wrong to decide that ATT had established any event of default, but, if they were right, then
2. ATT's acceleration of the loan and/or its appropriation of the charged shares was vitiated by bad faith or improper purpose, and, if that argument fails,
3. Cukurova should be accorded relief from forfeiture.

=== At the Privy Council (January 2013) ===
In its main ruling, the Board held:

1. One event of default was made out, and it was unnecessary to consider any of the others.
2. The trial judge's findings afforded no basis for treating the appropriation of the charged shares as ineffective, and that was enough to decide this particular issue.
3. "[R]elief from forfeiture is available in principle where what is in question is forfeiture of proprietary or possessory rights, as opposed to merely contractual rights, regardless of the type of property concerned."
4. While "the present case involves a combination of unusual features which are most unlikely to be repeated," nothing in the Regulations precludes the availability of relief against forfeiture. In principle it remains available following the appropriation by ATT of the charged shares.

Before issuing a final order, it called for a further hearing to determine in what conditions such relief may be given.

== Subsequent rulings ==
=== Nature in which relief may be given (9 July 2013) ===
The Board ordered that payment amounting to about US$1.565 billion be made by Cukurova to ATT within 60 days of its ruling, consisting of principal, related interest and costs, less dividends earned by ATT during the period of litigation. They divided, however, by 3–2 as to the nature of the principles involved.

Lord Mance, joined by Lord Kerr and Lord Clarke, considered the extent to which equity could provide a remedy in this case:

The question is whether equity has any power to identify particular circumstances making it, exceptionally, inequitable or unconscionable to insist on redemption taking place on a basis which treats the loan as if it had remained continuously outstanding to date. In the Board's view, equity has such a power, albeit only exercisable in exceptional circumstances such as the present.

He identified nine areas where it could:

1. There is a distinction in practice between a situation where an extension of time to redeem is being sought while a loan remains outstanding and a situation like the present where the loan has been discharged at law by appropriation.
2. In origin, equity's intervention in aid of mortgagors after forfeiture appears to have been based on general considerations of equitable conscience, rather than the (later) rationalisation that time was not to be treated as of the essence.
3. There are close similarities between the equitable relief available in respect of mortgages and leases.
4. The object of the court when granting relief is to put the lessor (as well as the lessee) back in the position in which he would have been if there had been no forfeiture.
5. The Board cannot accept that equity must ignore such matters, and is trapped within a conceptual framework which requires it to be assumed that the loan has remained continuously outstanding until the date of court ordered relief, whatever and however exceptional the circumstances of and after the appropriation.
6. The tender is directly relevant to the running of interest.
7. It is of some interest to look at equity's response to tenders or offers of repayment which are refused or do not, for other reasons involving the lender's fault, lead to actual repayment. In a number of such cases, the court has held, on equitable rather than legal grounds, that the mortgagor was as a result relieved of any obligation to pay interest.
8. Where there is a contractual right to the costs, the discretion should ordinarily be exercised so as to reflect that contractual right. The power of the court to disallow a mortgagee's costs sought to be added to the mortgage security is a not a statutory power, but from the power of courts of equity to fix the terms on which redemption will be allowed.
9. The importance of certainty is not confined to common law contexts, but extends to equitable contexts.

In summary, he stated:

Nevertheless, the Board emphasises that it is in no way suggesting that equity recognises any general or open-ended discretion. The Board's reasoning and decision in this case are based on and confined to what it sees as an exceptional situation, in which it would, in the Board's view, be both inequitable and unconscionable to ignore the background and circumstances of the tender made on 27th May 2007 and to treat the grant of relief as conditional upon the loan reviving and remaining outstanding for six years as if nothing would have or had ever happened in the meanwhile. The unusual facts of this case are in this respect probably unlikely to be repeated.

Lord Neuberger and Lord Sumption disagreed with the majority view that "the question what the borrower must pay to get relief from forfeiture cannot depend only on the contract." They held that equity relieves on the ground that:

1. the forfeiture of the borrower's property for what may be a trivial and rectifiable breach is penal,
2. the true intention of the parties is that the property should stand as a security only, and
3. the borrower is in principle entitled to redeem the charge over his property even after the security has been enforced.

Accordingly, "What equity does not do, in the minority's opinion, is relieve from the other terms of the contract which are not penal. It follows that those terms of the contract determine what the debtor must do if he is to be relieved from the forfeiture."

=== Variation of order (29 July 2013) ===
As a result of proceedings arising in the United States District Court for the Southern District of New York, (Note: In a series of proceedings in New York and the British Virgin Islands, Sonera Holdings (part of TeliaSonera, and a co-owner of ATT) attempted to restrain Cukurova from granting security in the shares, Cukurova attempted to obtain an anti-suit injunction against Sonera and ATT, and Sonera obtained a temporary restraining order in New York which prohibited Deutsche Bank (designated as ATT's bank for receiving payment from the escrow account) from accepting any payment in connection with the attempt by CH and CFI to redeem the shares (and forbidding DBAG from disclosing the order to CH or CFI). The restraining order was subsequently vacated by the United States Court of Appeals for the Second Circuit in April 2014, holding that, under Daimler AG v. Bauman, Sonera lacked jurisdiction in the matter. The United States Supreme Court denied Sonera's application for certiorari in June 2014.) Cukurova applied to the Privy Council, in a fourth hearing before the Board, to have the final order varied to provide for:

- an extension of time in order to comply with the requirement to pay the Redemption Sum;
- a determination in relation to the sum identified in paragraph 4 as to whether interest is payable during that period, and if so at what rate;
- other variations of certain terms, so as to avoid any problem arising from the injunctions granted by the New York Court.

The Board was not impressed with ATT's contentions that relief should not be given, observing:

The allegations of CH's disposal and non-disclosure of assets to avoid paying Sonera appear on the face of it to be made out, but that is res inter alios acta.

Accordingly, it ruled that:

1. justice would be best served by time being extended generally without a cut-off date, on terms that both parties have liberty to apply.
2. the running of interest at the rate of 8% p.a. over Libor should be suspended as from the end of 29 July 2013 (that is, 19 days after the Order in Council) on the ground that CH and CFI are currently being prevented from redeeming within the 60-day period envisaged by the Order in Council due to the positive actions of ATT, or taken by ATT in the name of Sonera and in its own interests.
3. because the precise nature of any order, if that indication does not come to fruition, is difficult to formulate at this stage, the Board will simply give liberty to apply as to machinery.

=== Extension of time (5 February 2014) ===
ATT later applied for a cut-off date for the payment. In February 2014, the Board decided that the current suspension of the payment deadline should be continued until such time as the New York Court reaches its decision on the case before it.

=== Further hearing (18 June 2014) ===
Further proceedings occurred with respect to a proposed new charge by a new lender to Cukurova. While agreeing that several conditions proposed to Alfa appeared sensible (subject to certain modifications), the Board gave both sides until the end of July to take instructions, and allowed interest to continue to run during that time. Both sides subsequently reached an agreement on the matter, which was approved by the Board in July 2014. The agreement meant that Cukurova would be able to recover its investment in Turkcell.

== Impact ==
The entire litigation history in this case has been described as being similar to "a low-budget horror film" that "has given the legal world plenty to think about." There was agreement that the case would continue to make new law.

There has been doubt as to the Board's suggestion that the facts arising in Cukurova were "unusual features," and its intervention may have been motivated by the fact that the facility agreement in question did not give rise to a commercially fair valuation. It remains to be seen whether the courts will take a robust approach in limiting Cukurova to its own facts, as appropriation provisions have become increasingly common in financial documents.

In its main judgment, the Board noted that in determining whether a material adverse change had arisen under the relevant clause in the facility agreement, "an event need not objectively have such an adverse effect: all that is required is that ATT believes that it has such an effect." A more restrictive approach has since been adopted by the Commercial Court of England and Wales.

== Aftermath ==
The complex and turbulent dispute with regard to the control of Turkcell has been supplemented by moves of the Turkish government in August 2013 to appoint directors to its board, which had lacked a quorum since 2010. This is seen as a move to keep Turkcell in Turkish hands, possibly through sale to a local investor.

The 2003 Regulations were amended in 2010 (Note: consequential to the passage of Directive 2009/44/EC of 6 May 2009 of the European Parliament and of the Council amending Directive 98/26/EC on settlement finality in payment and securities settlement systems and Directive 2002/47/EC on financial collateral arrangements as regards linked systems and credit claims) to extend the appropriation remedy to credit claims in addition to cash and financial instruments, and it will apply to all forms of security financial collateral arrangements. (Note: with effect from 6 April 2011) This effectively means that all charges, and not just mortgages, are covered. However, it is argued that the s. 17(2) framework for the remedy remains conceptually unsound and is unworkable with respect to situations involving chained holding of book-entry securities.

In November 2015, the Supreme Court of New Zealand granted leave to appeal a ruling of the New Zealand Court of Appeal, in a case involving possessory interests in resource consents granted under the Resource Management Act 1991, in which it held that relief against forfeiture was available in such circumstances but it declined to exercise its discretion to grant it in that case. In February 2016, it was announced that the appeal was being abandoned, and was therefore deemed to be dismissed.

== See also ==
- British Virgin Islands company law
- Security interest
