= Lee Ting Sang v Chung Chi-Keung =

- Court: Judicial Committee of the Privy Council
- Decided: 22 January 1990
- Citations: [1990] UKPC 9, [1990] ICR 409

Court membership
- Judges sitting: Lord Bridge of Harwich, Lord Templeman, Lord Griffiths, Lord Goff of Chieveley, Lord Lowry

Keywords
- Contract of employment

Lee Ting Sang v Chung Chi-Keung [1990] UKPC 9 is a Hong Kong and UK labour law case concerning the scope of protection of employment rights. It took the view that an employment contract requires that regard be had to the economic reality of the relationship, looking at factors such as whether a person uses their own tools or takes on business risks.

The case was heard on appeal from the Court of Appeal of Hong Kong.

== Facts ==
A skilled stonemason wanted to claim he was within the health and safety regulations. To do so, he would have to be regarded in law as an employee.

== Advice ==
Mr Lee Ting Sang was regarded as an employee. Therefore, he could claim that he was within the health and safety regulations. This was in spite of the fact that he was not, due to the skills he possessed, instructed how to do the job. The court took into account that he (1) worked mainly for a subcontractor on short-term basis, (2) was paid a piece-work rate or a daily rate, (3) did not possess any equipment, (4) did not hire any helpers, and (5) was not required to exercise management of the job,

== Significance ==
The Privy Council took into account a number of factors to determine if there was a legal relationship of employment. They held that this was indeed the case, despite the fact that the worker here was skilled. Traditionally, skill was a factor which negated the existence of a legal relationship of employment.

== See also ==
- Contract of employment in English law
- UK labour law
- EU labour law
- US labor law
- German labour law
