= Meates v Attorney-General =

- Court: Court of Appeal of New Zealand
- Full case name: Meates v A-G
- Decided: 17 October 1983
- Citation: [1983] NZLR 308

Court membership
- Judges sitting: Woodhouse P, Cooke J, Ongley J

Keywords
- negligence

Meates v Attorney-General [1983] NZLR 308 is a cited case in New Zealand regarding negligence cases against the government.

== Background ==
Matai Industries was a West Coast timber firm. After the promised financial assistance promised to Matai by various Ministers, and the Prime Minister Norman Kirk failed to eventuate, Matai was placed into receivership.

Meates, one of the shareholders in Matai, sued the government in tort. The Government countered that they owed Matai no duty of care.

== Held ==
The court held that the government owed Matai a duty of care.
