= Duomatic principle =

"[W]here the articles of a company require a course to be approved by a group of shareholders at a general meeting, that requirement can be avoided if all members of the group, being aware of the relevant facts, either give their approval to that course, or so conduct themselves as to make it inequitable for them to deny that they have given their approval."
EIC Services Ltd v Phipps [2003] EWHC 1507 (Ch), per Neuberger J

The Duomatic principle is a principle of English company law relating to the informal approval of actions by a company's shareholders (and, potentially, directors). The principle is named after one of the earlier judicial decisions in which it was recognised: Re Duomatic Ltd [1969] 2 Ch 365, although in that case Buckley J was approving an older statement of the law from the decisions in In re Express Engineering [1920] 1 Ch 466 and Parker and Cooper Ltd v Reading [1926] Ch 975. It origins lie in the obiter dictum comments of Lord Davey in Salomon v Salomon & Co Ltd where he stated that 'the company is bound in a matter intra vires by the unanimous agreement of its members'.

The principle will apply even if the articles of association specifies a particular procedure in relation to the subject matter of the decision.

It has been noted that although the principle is normally referred to as the Duomatic principle, the actual rule predates that case by several decades.

== Re Duomatic ==
The decision in Re Duomatic concerned whether certain payments made to directors of a company were valid even though none of the directors had contracts of service with the company, and no resolution had ever been passed authorising them to receive the payments. The company went into liquidation and the liquidator made an application for repayment of the money. The court held that the payments were to be regarded as properly authorised because they had been made with the full knowledge and consent of all the shareholders. Buckley J explained:

I proceed upon the basis that where it can be shown that all shareholders who have a right to attend and vote at a general meeting of the company assent to some matter which a general meeting of the company could carry into effect, that assent is as binding as a resolution in general meeting would be.

The broad principle has never been seriously questioned by the courts since. In EIC Services Ltd v Phipps [2003] EWHC 1507 Neuberger J stated:

The essence of the Duomatic principle, as I see it, is that, where the articles of a company require a course to be approved by a group of shareholders at a general meeting, that requirement can be avoided if all members of the group, being aware of the relevant facts, either give their approval to that course, or so conduct themselves as to make it inequitable for them to deny that they have given their approval. Whether the approval is given in advance or after the event, whether it is characterised as agreement, ratification, waiver, or estoppel, and whether members of the group give their consent in different ways at different times, does not matter.

== Requirements ==
The application of the Duomatic principle contains two core requirements:

- The consent of shareholders must be unanimous.
- The shareholders must consent with full knowledge of what it is they are consenting to.

Furthermore, subsequent cases indicate that there must be some outward manifestation of the consent, either in the form of a document, a statement or by conduct. A mere "internal decision" on the part of the shareholders is not sufficient by itself. In Rolfe v Rolfe [2010] EWHC 244 Newey J stated:

I do not accept that a shareholder's mere internal decision can of itself constitute assent for Duomatic purposes. I was not referred to any authority in which it had been decided that a mere internal decision would suffice. Further, for a mere internal decision, unaccompanied by outward manifestation or acquiescence, to be enough would, as it seems to me, give rise to unacceptable uncertainty and, potentially, provide opportunities for abuse. A company may change hands or enter into an insolvency procedure; in either event, it is desirable that past decisions should be objectively verifiable. In my judgment, there must be material from which an observer could discern or (as in the case of acquiescence) infer assent. The law applies an objective test in other contexts: for example, when determining whether a contract has been formed. An objective approach must, I think, also have a role with the Duomatic principle.

== Expansion ==
In subsequent cases courts have expanded the general principle to also apply to a wider array of situations.

- In Ciban Management Corporation v Citco (BVI) Ltd [2020] UKPC 31 it was affirmed that the principle applied to the ostensible authority of persons as well as to express authority.
- In Shahar v Tsitsekkos [2004] EWHC 2659 (Ch) it was held that the consent of the beneficial owner of any shares would be sufficient if the trustee can be compelled to vote in accordance with the beneficial owner's wishes. But in Rolfe v Rolfe [2010] EWHC 244 (Ch) it was clarified that where shares were held for more than one beneficial owner as joint owners, the assent of only one of the joint owners would not be sufficient.
- In Runciman v Walter Runciman plc [1992] BCLC 1084 at 1092 and Base Metal Trading v Shamurin [2004] EWCA Civ 1316 it was held that informal and unanimous consent of the board of directors is also effective as a resolution passed at a duly convened meeting. Prior to those cases there was doubt as to whether the principle would apply to directors because of their fiduciary duties to the company might preclude informal assent.
- The principle has also been extended beyond company law to include committees of clubs which are unincorporated associations, see Speechley v Allott [2014] EWCA Civ 230.
