= Commissioner of Inland Revenue v Challenge Corp Ltd =

New Zealand legal case

- Court: Privy Council
- Full case name: Commissioner of Inland Revenue v Challenge Corporation Limited
- Decided: 20 October 1986
- Citation: [1986] NZPC 1; [1986] UKPC 45; [1987] AC 155; [1986] 2 NZLR 513; [1987] 2 WLR 24; (1986) 10 TRNZ 161
- Transcript: Privy Council ruling

Court membership
- Judges sitting: Lord Keith of Kinkel, Lord Brightman, Lord Templeman, Lord Oliver of Aylmerton, Lord Goff of Chieveley

Commissioner of Inland Revenue v Challenge Corp Ltd [1986] NZPC 1; [1986] UKPC 45; [1987] AC 155; [1986] 2 NZLR 513; [1987] 2 WLR 24; (1986) 10 TRNZ 161 is a prominent case in New Zealand tax law regarding the issue of tax avoidance.

The suit involved a dispute about whether a "taxpayer company was entitled to deduct a tax loss incurred by another member of the same group of companies from its assessable income." The High Court of New Zealand decided in favor of Challenge Corp Ltd and its decision was "upheld by a majority of the Court of Appeal." This decision was then appealed by Commissioner of Inland Revenue to the Judicial Committee of the Privy Council.
