= Idle No More =

Grassroots movement for indigenous rights

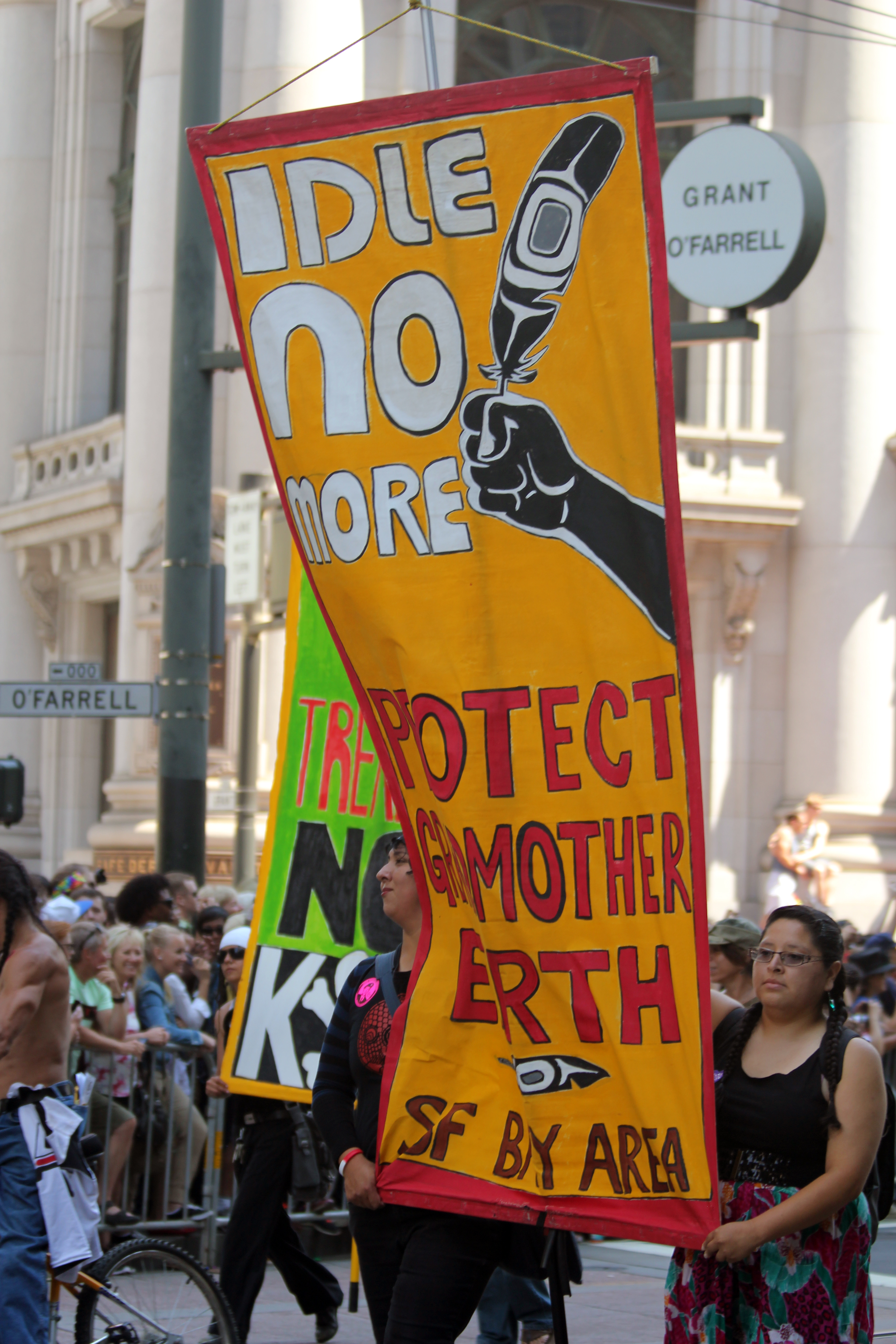
- Formation: November 2012
- Type: Grassroots
- Purpose: A grassroots movement for indigenous sovereignty, indigenous rights and respect for the treaties. Goals include stopping environmental degradation and economic and social inequality.
- Headquarters: First Nations
- Location: Canada
- Region served: Worldwide
- Founders: Jessica Gordon, Sylvia McAdam, Sheelah McLean, Nina Wilson
- Website: idlenomore.ca
- Remarks: methods include: Civil disobedience; Demonstrations; Hunger strikes; Internet activism; Nonviolent resistance; Picketing; Transportation blocks

Idle No More is an ongoing protest movement, founded in December 2012 by four women: three First Nations women and one non-Native ally. It is a grassroots movement among the Indigenous peoples in Canada comprising the First Nations, Métis and Inuit peoples and their non-Indigenous supporters in Canada, and to a lesser extent, internationally. It has consisted of a number of political actions worldwide, inspired in part by the liquid diet hunger strike of Attawapiskat Chief Theresa Spence and further coordinated via social media. A reaction to alleged legislative abuses of Indigenous treaty rights by then Prime Minister Stephen Harper and the Conservative federal government, the movement takes particular issue with the omnibus bill Jobs and Growth Act (Bill C-45). The popular movement has included round dances in public places and blockades of rail lines.

In March 2026, there was a proposed revival of the Idle No More movement, in response to the Canadian government's Bill C-5. Scott McLeod, the Lake Huron regional chief for the Anishinabek Nation, was particularly vocal in criticizing the legislation.

== Background ==
After the May 2, 2011 Canadian Federal election, the Conservative federal government, led by Stephen Harper, proposed a number of omnibus bills introducing sweeping changes. While omnibus bills had been presented to parliament by previous governments, the removal of protections for forests and waterways proposed in Bill C-45 led to concern among Indigenous communities and environmentalists. Of particular concern is the removal of the term "absolute surrender" in Section 208.

A number of these measures drew fire from environmental and First Nations groups. In particular, Bill C-45 overhauled the Navigable Waters Protection Act (NWPA) of 1882, renaming it the Navigation Protection Act (NPA). The NWPA had mandated an extensive approval and consultation process before construction of any kind could take place in or around any water which could in principle be navigated by any kind of floating craft. Under the new NPA, the approval process would only be required for development around one of a vastly circumscribed list of waterways set by the Minister of Transportation. Many of the newly deregulated waterways passed through traditional First Nations land.

While the NWPA had originally been intended to facilitate actual navigation, the ubiquity of waterways in the Canadian wilderness has given it the effect of strong environmental legislation by presenting a significant barrier to industrial development, especially to projects such as pipelines which crossed many rivers. The government had by this time been engaged for some years in a campaign for approval of the Enbridge Northern Gateway Pipelines project, a proposal to build a pipeline for bitumen condensate connecting the Athabasca tar sands with the Pacific Ocean, facilitating unprocessed bitumen exports to China.

Many bills affecting First Nations people have failed to be passed. Numerous attempts to introduce bills have failed due to their low priority for past federal governments, eventually dying on the order paper without being debated or passed. In 1996 Bill C-79, the Indian Act Optional Modification Act died on the order paper. In 2002, Bill C-7, the First Nations Governance Act, attempted to reform reserve administration. It died in 2003. In 2008, there was Bill C-47, the Family Homes on Reserves and Matrimonial Interests or Rights Act, to redress inequity in the treatment of women. That one died on the order paper three times but eventually passed in 2013. The Kelowna Accord was agreed by the Martin government, but was neither endorsed nor implemented by the subsequent Harper government. These failures harmed relations between Natives and the government. Further background to this is the feeling that the federal government has repeatedly acted in bad faith with Aboriginal peoples' interests, and have violated treaties when it suited them. The feeling that the traditional tactics of negotiating with the federal government have become meaningless has caused support for new tactics.

== Vision and goals ==
The founders of Idle No More outlined the vision and goals of the movement in a January 10, 2013 press release as follows:

The Vision [...] revolves around Indigenous Ways of Knowing rooted in Indigenous Sovereignty to protect water, air, land and all creation for future generations.

The Conservative government bills beginning with Bill C-45 threaten Treaties and this Indigenous Vision of Sovereignty.

The movement promotes environmental protection and indigenous sovereignty. It plans to accomplish these goals by:

1. Implementing leadership structure and councils (Such as the Council of Women)
2. Taking training in coordinating rallies, media, messaging and safety issues as well as in identifying provocateurs, misinformation shills, and propaganda.
3. Placing key spokespeople and connecting with experienced experts in different areas; i.e. treaty research, indigenous rights and governance, environmental activism, writers, international spokesperson, national etc.
4. Creating chapters across Turtle Island under the umbrella of the main INM.
5. Requesting regular meetings with First Nations leadership to have ongoing discussions regarding third party agreements between the Government of Canada and industry corporations

To date the movement has been particularly focused on:

1. The education and the revitalization of indigenous peoples through awareness and empowerment.
2. Encouraging knowledge sharing about indigenous sovereignty and environmental protections.

The press release also notes that "As a grassroots movement, clearly no political organization speaks for Idle No More". Furthermore, this is not just an Aboriginal Canadian movement. These pipeline projects will be stretching beyond borders carving through critical ecosystems and landscapes in the States. Canada's large oil reserves have attracted industry to exploit, and profit, "The tar sands industry aims to create an extensive web of pipelines to deliver increasing amounts of this Canadian tar sands sludge to refineries in the United States" (Glick, page 2). Reports say that some 900,000 barrels of oil per day will be traveling from Canada tar sands through these pipelines. According to the National Wildlife Federation report, these pipelines will stretch thousands and thousands of miles through Canada and into the States and will leave devastation along its paths. "This pipeline system would virtually assure the destruction of swaths of one of the world's most important forest ecosystems, produce lake-sized reservoirs of toxic waste, import a thick, tarlike fuel that will release vast quantities of toxic chemicals into our air when it is refined in the U.S., and emit significantly more global warming pollutants into the atmosphere than fuels made from conventional oil" (Glick, page 3). These impacts are already being seen in Canada's peoples and wildlife. "Communities that live near the tar sands are already experiencing health problems linked to the pollution, and dozens of wildlife species are at risk, including millions of migrating cranes, swans, and songbirds" (Glick, page 3). With the magnitude and power of this project, these negative impacts will not end soon, and will not end in Canada. These pipelines will stretch across borders and come into our own backyards here in the states.

Idle No More's vision has been linked by some commentators in the press with longstanding leftist political theories of indigenism. During the protests of late 2012 and early 2013, the theoretical framework of Idle No More has been frequently articulated in the Canadian press by Pamela Palmater. Palmater has denounced what she perceives as the federal government's "assimilationist agenda". It has been suggested by others that the definition of "nation" is itself problematic.

Sylvia McAdam, a co-founder of the movement, has said that she does not condone the rail or road blockade tactics that some demonstrators have used, and has spoken in support of peaceful protest "within the legal boundaries".

== History ==
Members of the Nipissing First Nation from southern Ontario and local non-Aboriginal supporters in Ottawa

The movement was initiated by activists Nina Wilson, Sheelah McLean, Sylvia McAdam Saysewahum, and Jessica Gordon in November 2012, during a teach-in at Station 20 West in Saskatoon called "Idle No More", held in response to the Harper government's introduction of the Jobs and Growth Act (Bill C-45). Sylvia McAdam, an author and educator from the Nehiyaw (Cree) Nation, stated that "one of our strongest motivations is our children. We want them to witness that we weren’t silent about Bill C-45".

C-45 is a large omnibus bill implementing numerous measures, many of which activists claim weaken environmental protection laws. In particular, laws protecting all of the country's navigable waterways were limited in scope to protect only a few waterways of practical importance for navigation. Many of the affected waterways pass through land reserved to First Nations.

Law blog writer/observer Lorraine Land, and Idle No More itself, identified the following bills as affecting natives or native sovereignty currently in 2013:

- Bill C-38 (Budget Omnibus Bill #1)
- Bill C-45 (Budget Omnibus Bill #2)
- Bill C-27 First Nations Financial Transparency Act
- Bill S-2 Family Homes on Reserve and Matrimonial Interests or Right Act
- Bill S-6 First Nations Elections Act
- Bill S-8 Safe Drinking Water for First Nations
- Bill C-428 Indian Act Amendment and Replacement Act
- Bill S-207 An Act to amend the Interpretation Act
- Bill S-212 First Nations Self-Government Recognition Bill
- "First Nations" Private Ownership Act

This led to a series of teach-ins, rallies and protests that were planned by the founders in a National Day Of Action on Dec 10 which coincided with Amnesty International's Human Rights Day. These coincided with similar protests already underway in British Columbia over the Northern Gateway and Pacific Trails pipelines as well as a march and protest organized by students at the Native Education College.

The protests were timed to coincide with the announcement that Chief Theresa Spence of Attawapiskat was launching a liquid diet to demand a meeting with Prime Minister Harper and the Governor General of Canada to discuss Aboriginal rights. The Assembly of First Nations then issued an open letter December 16 to Governor General David Johnston, calling for a meeting to discuss Spence's demands.

Also on December 17 the Confederacy of Treaty No. 6 First Nations issued a press release saying that they did not recognize the legality of any laws passed by the federal parliament, "including but not limited to Bill C-45, which do not fulfill their constitutionally recognized and affirmed treaty and Aboriginal rights; as well as the Crown's legal obligations to meaningfully consult and accommodate First Nations."

As of January 4, 2013, the main goals have been narrowed down to (1) the establishment of a nation-to-nation relationship between First Nations and the Government of Canada, rather than a relationship as defined in the Indian Act to address issues and (2) social and environmental sustainability.

== Resource exploitation ==
The Idle No More movement generally opposes certain types of resource exploitation, particularly on First Nations territory. The movement takes this stance against resource exploitation, as attributed to First Nations sovereignty and environmental sustainability. The position is supported by many groups including non-governmental and grassroots organizations. In a human rights report on Canada, Amnesty International suggested that the government should have "respect for indigenous rights when issuing licences for mining, logging and petroleum and other resource extraction."

The Idle No More movement outlines ways by which it opposes resource exploitation, although these views are contested within the First Nations population itself. It communicates the need for treaty modernization as well as increased land claims. It also advocates against resource exploitation on First Nations land without any benefit to the First Nations. Furthermore, the movement argues that First Nations communities do not get an equitable share of the profits from natural resource exploitation and encourages the government to address this issue.

One demonstration reflecting opposition to resource exploitation was held at Barriere Lake in Quebec by the Algonquin people. It closed Highway 117 and was reported "to draw attention to forestry operations that they oppose on their lands."

In British Columbia (B.C.), the specific focus within resource exploitation is opposition to oil pipeline construction. Frank Brown, organizer of a B.C. Idle No More protest and a member of the Heiltsuk First Nation, said the B.C. group opposed proposed pipelines such as the Enbridge Northern Gateway pipeline. Moreover, several First Nations communities, the BC Métis Federation, the Union of British Columbian Municipalities, and several local governments have passed resolutions banning pipelines in B.C. and opposing Enbridge specifically.

== Protests in Canada ==
Two members of the Siksika Nation from southern Alberta and a local non-Aboriginal supporter in Ottawa

The use of flash mobs performing round dances in shopping malls became a recurring theme of the protest during the pre- and post-Christmas shopping season in 2012. On December 17 a flash mob performed a round dance at the Cornwall Centre shopping mall in Regina. The following day a similar flash mob round dance occurred at West Edmonton Mall. This tactic was also used at the Rideau Centre in Ottawa and St. Vital Centre in Winnipeg. It spread internationally with a similar protest at the Mall of America in Minnesota. Members of the Sandy Bay First Nation in Manitoba blocked the Trans-Canada Highway on December 15, 2012. Members of the Driftpile First Nation also blocked a road on December 18.

The group executed their second round dance flash mob in Saskatchewan on December 20, this time at Midtown Plaza in Saskatoon. Two thousand people filled the upper and lower levels of the mall for the 10-minute dance of the flash mob. Also on this day, organizers started gathering people around the Vimy war memorial on the Saskatoon riverbank. On December 27 an online source reported that there had been 100 protests in Canada to date

On December 30, as part of a day of nationwide actions, a group believed to be involved with Idle No More blocked the Canadian National main railway line between the country's two largest cities of Toronto and Montreal at a point near Belleville, Ontario for approximately three hours. On January 2, Waterfront Station in Vancouver was packed for a demonstration drawing hundreds of participants. Protestors danced and chanted. Protestors filled Toronto's Eaton Centre, while a simultaneous protest occurred in the West Edmonton Mall, 50 Protestors at Clifton Hill in Niagara Falls, and other locations in Canada. On January 5, 2013, protests shut down multiple border crossings throughout Canada, including Blue Water Bridge in Sarnia, Ontario, International Bridge in Cornwall, Ontario, the Peace Arch crossing in Surrey, B.C., The Peace Bridge between Fort Erie and Buffalo in the Niagara region, and NWT's Deh Cho Bridge. The International Bridge in Cornwall had not been closed since a month-long dispute between Akwesasne Nation and CBSA.

On January 11, 2013, thousands of people participated in Idle No More demonstrations in all regions of Canada. In Vancouver, British Columbia, a mass march and rally was held at Vancouver City Hall. It was estimated over 1000 people attended the march which started at the Native Education College.

== Solidarity protests ==
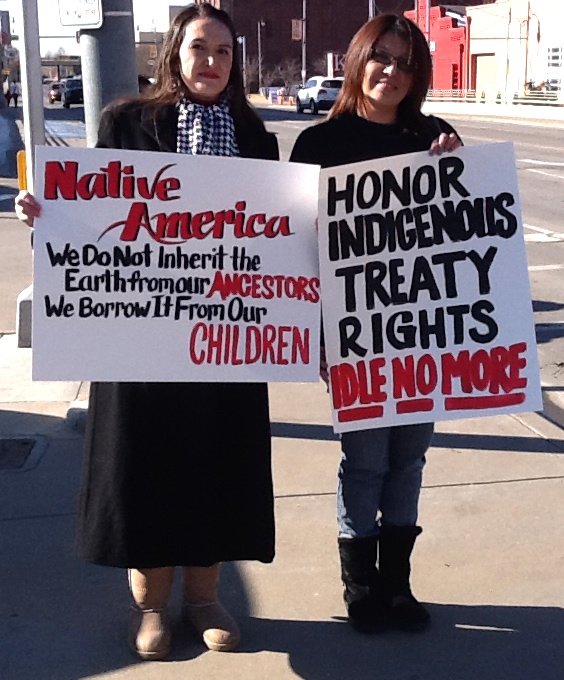
Indigenous protesters at an Idle No More event in Oklahoma City, Oklahoma

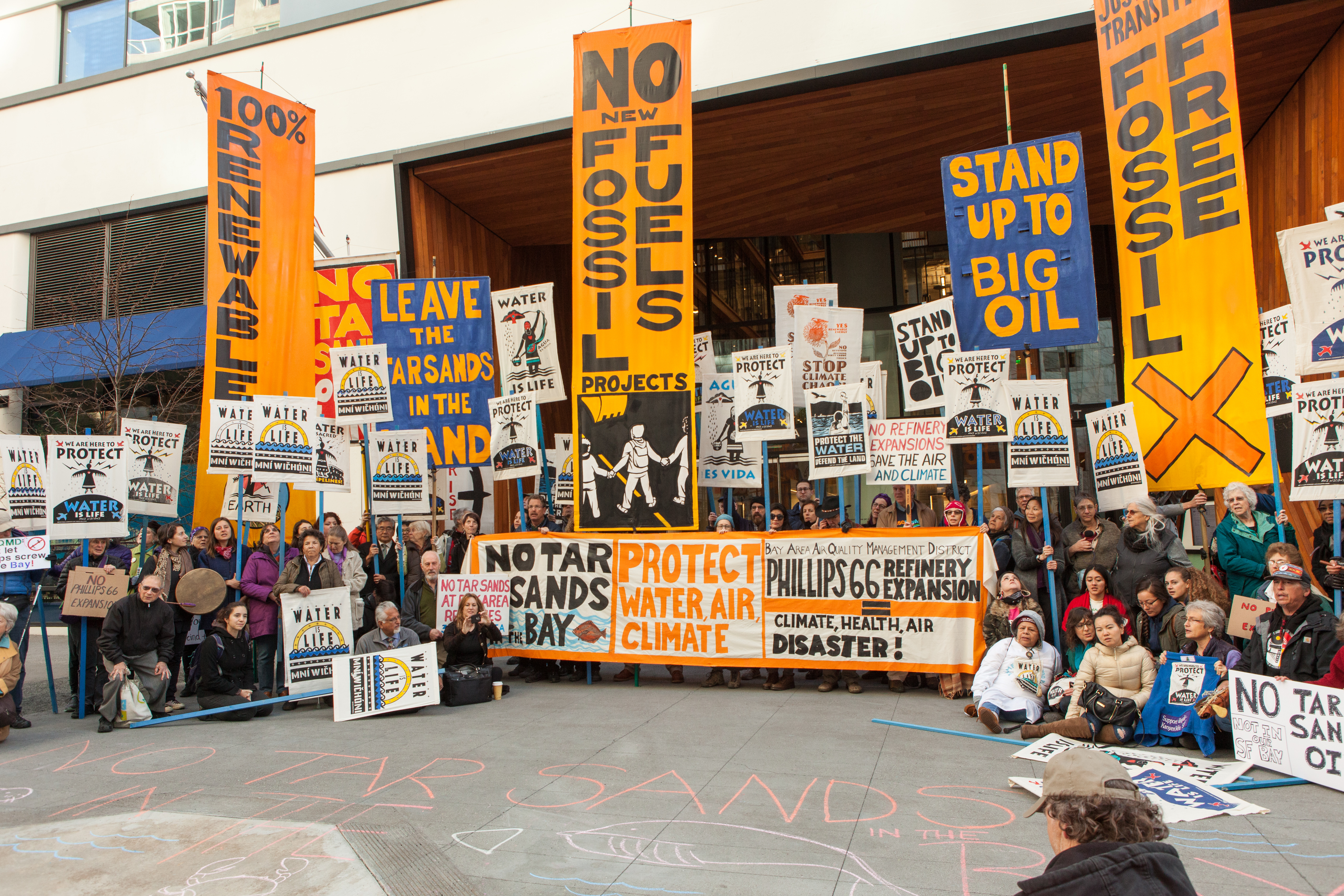
Idle No More SF Bay and other protesters against bringing tar sands to the San Francisco Bay gather outside the Bay Area Air Quality Management District, March 2018.

The protests have also spread outside of Canada. On December 27 an online source reported that there had been 30 Idle No More protests in the United States, and solidarity protests in Stockholm, Sweden, London, UK, Berlin, Germany, Auckland, New Zealand, and Cairo, Egypt. On December 30, approximately 100 people from Walpole Island marched to Algonac, Michigan. CBS reported that "hundreds" attended a flash mob at the Mall of America in Minneapolis, Minnesota. The Twin Cities Daily Planet called it a crowd of "over a thousand" and stated that it followed a similar protest a week earlier where Clyde Bellecourt had been arrested, as well as another flash mob at the Paul Bunyan Mall in Bemidji. On January 5, the International Bridge was closed again due to Mohawk protests from New York.

Within the United States, protests have been reported in many states: Michigan, Minnesota, Ohio, New York, Arizona, Colorado, Maine, New Mexico, Vermont, South Carolina, Washington State, Washington, D.C., Indiana and Texas.

== Support ==
Former Liberal Prime Minister Paul Martin, who had supported the Kelowna Accords, said that Theresa Spence's efforts made her "an inspiration to all Canadians". Former Progressive Conservative Prime Minister Joe Clark also met Spence and made a speech afterward saying that Canada and First Nations were on a dangerous path.

In solidarity with the movement, Council of Canadians National Chairperson Maude Barlow, author Naomi Klein, and singer Sarah Slean have returned their Queen Elizabeth II Diamond Jubilee Medals.

== Criticism ==
Criticism of the Idle No More movement has appeared in Canada's mainstream media, which has covered related high-profile protests such as road blockades and Spence's fast.

Protesters in Ottawa

The parliamentary secretary to the Minister of Aboriginal Affairs stated to media that "With respect to Bill C-45, the changes to property leasing provisions, these changes respond directly to the request of a number of First Nations Chiefs to provide them with more flexibility".

Conservative Senator Patrick Brazeau, who is Aboriginal and a former chief, has told media that the demonstrations lacked focus in protesting "a whole gamut of issues". He also said that democratic processes were available for participating in decision-making affecting First Nations. He criticized Theresa Spence's tactics, saying she should have used the "proper parliamentary process."

== Effects ==
The founders of the Idle No More movement have emphasized their intention for the movement to remain at its core a "grassroots" movement, led by Indigenous women; they have released a statement to say that they have a different vision than that of the "leadership" of First Nation Chiefs, saying "we have been given a clear mandate … to work outside of the systems of government." By early January 2013, Shawn Atleo, leader of the Assembly of First Nations, and other Chiefs, were beginning to "use the protests' momentum to press Ottawa on treaty rights and improved living standards." The protests have been noted for creating a stream of polarized debate online, bringing out both supporters and detractors.

=== January 11, 2013 meeting ===
Idle No More supporters occupying the grounds of Parliament Hill on January 11

On January 4, 2013, Prime Minister Harper announced a meeting with a delegation of First Nation leaders coordinated by the Assembly of First Nations (AFN), to follow up on the issues discussed during the Crown-First Nations Gathering on January 24, 2012. His statement announcing the meeting made no mention of Idle No More. The meeting was held on January 11, 2013.

The preparations were the subject of intense negotiation and debate within the AFN membership, until late in the evening of the eve of the meeting. Some chiefs voted not to participate, choosing to boycott the meeting for various reasons, including demands that more chiefs be included in the AFN delegation, questions over what to include on the meeting's agenda, and the fact that the Governor General would not be present throughout the meeting, and would be limited to a shorter ceremonial meeting after the meeting with Prime Minister Harper.

The day of the meeting, members of the Idle No More movement organized protests on Parliament Hill (drawing an estimated 3000 demonstrators), and in cities across Canada. Idle No More spokesperson Pam Palmater, who ran against Atleo for the position of National Chief with the AFN, said in a CBC discussion that the diverse positions expressed among the AFN chiefs "doesn't mean good things for the AFN".

The January 11 meeting was attended by National Chief Shawn Atleo and a delegation of chiefs from several provinces and the Yukon, AFN representatives from its Youth Council, Women's Council and Elders Council (Ontario and Manitoba chiefs boycotted the meeting). While it had previously been announced that Harper would only attend portions of the meeting, he attended the entire meeting. The meeting was also attended by Aboriginal Affairs Minister John Duncan, his Parliamentary Secretary Greg Rickford, Cabinet Ministers Tony Clement and Leona Aglukkaq, and senior officials from the Privy Council Office, Aboriginal Affairs and Northern Development Canada, and several other federal departments. The ceremonial meeting with Governor General Johnston was attended by around 100 chiefs, including Chief Theresa Spence.

After the meeting, Aboriginal Affairs Minister John Duncan stated that it would be followed by "high-level dialogue" between Harper and Atleo, including follow-up meetings and more frequent reporting on Aboriginal matters by the federal government. Matthew Coon Come, a former AFN National Chief who has been confronted by protestors, attended the meeting, stated after the meeting that the "prime minister had moved a couple of posts forward", furthering discussions on treaty process and specific land claims, and that the prime minister indicated a willingness to consult with First Nations on environmental issues and legislative matters that impact Aboriginal territories.

== See also ==
- Attawapiskat housing and infrastructure crisis
- Great Peace of Montreal
- Jay Treaty
- List of protests in the 21st century
- The Journey of Nishiyuu, a 2013 walk by a group of Cree youth in support of the movement
- Numbered Treaties
- Status of First Nations treaties in B.C.
- Two Row Wampum Treaty
- Indigenous concerns over the Keystone pipeline
- The People of the Kattawapiskak River and Trick or Treaty?, related documentary films by Alanis Obomsawin
