= Jobs, Growth and Long-term Prosperity Act =

Canadian budget bill of 2012

Parliament of Canada
- Long title: An Act to implement certain provisions of the budget tabled in Parliament on March 29, 2012 and other measures
- Enacted by: House of Commons
- Enacted by: Senate
- Royal assent: June 29, 2012

Legislative history

First chamber: House of Commons
- Bill citation: Bill C-38
- Introduced by: Jim Flaherty, Minister of Finance
- First reading: April 26, 2012
- Second reading: May 14, 2012
- Third reading: June 18, 2012
- Committee report: July 7, 2012

The Jobs, Growth and Long-term Prosperity Act (French: Loi sur l’emploi, la croissance et la prospérité durable, informally referred to as Bill C-38) is an Act of the Parliament of Canada. This omnibus bill was introduced by Jim Flaherty, Minister of Finance under Prime Minister Steven Harper's majority Conservative government as a 2012 Budget Implementation Act. Bill C-38 was given Royal Assent on June 29, 2012. Bill C-38 and Bill C-45 attracted controversy both for their size (c. 450 pages each) and for the breadth of provisions contained that were not fiscally related. Elizabeth May, leader of the Green Party, claimed (Levitz June 2012) that, "[i]n spite of the fact that most Canadians have no idea how seriously Bill C-38 will affect their lives, the Senate is about to begin hearings so that Conservative Senators can vote on it as soon as possible... This railroading version of democracy is tragic for Canada."

== Content of Bill ==
Part 1 of this enactment "implements certain income tax measures and related measures proposed in the March 29, 2012 budget."

Other sections of C-38 amend the

- Income Tax Act
- Excise Tax Act
- Environmental Violations Administrative Monetary Penalties Act
- National Energy Board Act
- Canada Oil and Gas Operations Act
- Nuclear Safety and Control Act
- Fisheries Act
- Canadian Environmental Protection Act 1999
- Species at Risk Act
- Trust and Loan Companies Act
- Bank Act
- Cooperative Credit Associations Act
- Northwest Territories Act
- Nunavut Act
- Yukon Act
- Financial Administration Act
- Department of Human Resources and Skills Development Act
- Parks Canada Agency Act
- Trust and Loan Companies Act
- Insurance Companies Act
- National Housing Act
- Canada Mortgage and Housing Corporation Act
- Supporting Vulnerable Seniors and Strengthening Canada’s Economy Act
- National Housing Act
- Bretton Woods and Related Agreements Act
- Canada Health Act
- Canadian Security Intelligence Service Act
- Currency Act
- Federal-Provincial Fiscal Arrangements Act
- Fisheries Act
- Food and Drugs Act
- Government Employees Compensation Act
- International Development Research Centre Act
- Canada Labour Code
- Environmental Violations Administrative Monetary Penalties Act
- Old Age Security Act
- Seeds Act
- Statutory Instruments Act
- Investment Canada Act
- Customs Act
- Railway Safety Act
- Canadian International Trade Tribunal Act
- Health of Animals Act
- Canada School of Public Service Act
- Corrections and Conditional Release Act
- Coasting Trade Act
- Status of the Artist Act
- National Round Table on the Environment and the Economy Act
- Telecommunications Act
- Employment Equity Act
- Employment Insurance Act
- Customs Tariff
- Canada Marine Act
- First Nations Land Management Act
- Canada Travelling Exhibitions Indemnification Act
- Canadian Air Transport Security Authority Act
- First Nations Fiscal and Statistical Management Act
- Canadian Forces Members and Veterans Re-establishment and Compensation Act
- Department of Human Resources and Skills Development Act, to add powers, duties and functions that are substantially the same as those conferred by the Department of Social Development Act
- Wage Earner Protection Program Act
- Immigration and Refugee Protection Act
- Budget Implementation Act 2008
- Shared Services Canada Act
- Assisted Human Reproduction Act

C-38 dissolves the Public Appointments Commission and its secretariat and dissolves the Canadian Artists and Producers Professional Relations Tribunal and transfer its powers and duties to the Canada Industrial Relations Board.

C-38 implements the Framework Agreement on Integrated Cross-Border Maritime Law Enforcement Operations between the Government of Canada and the Government of the United States of America signed on May 26, 2009.

C-38 repeals the Canadian Environmental Assessment Act, Fair Wages and Hours of Labour Act; the International Centre for Human Rights and Democratic Development Act and authorizes the closing out of the affairs of the centre established by that Act; repeals provisions related to the First Nations Statistical Institute and amends that Act and other Acts to remove any reference to that Institute. It authorizes the Minister of Indian Affairs and Northern Development to close out the institute's affairs; repeals the Department of Social Development Act and, in doing so, eliminates the National Council of Welfare; repeals the Kyoto Protocol Implementation Act.

C-38 eliminates the requirement for the Auditor General of Canada to undertake annual financial audits of certain entities and to assess the performance reports of two agencies. This Division also eliminates other related obligations.

== Sections of Bill Challenged by Opposition ==
Bill C-38 Changes Clearing the Way for Resource Extraction:

=== Canadian Environmental Assessment Act ===
"Environmental effects" under the "new CEAA will be limited to effects on fish, aquatic species under the Species at Risk Act, migratory birds. A broader view of impacts is limited to: federal lands, Aboriginal peoples, and changes to the environment "directly linked or necessarily incidental" to federal approval (May 2012)."

=== Canadian Environmental Assessment Agency ===
The Agency will have 45 days after receiving an application to decide if an assessment is required. Environmental assessments are no longer required for projects involving federal money. The Minister is given wide discretion to decide. New "substitution" rules allow Ottawa to download EAs to the provinces; "comprehensive" studies are eliminated. Cabinet will be able to over-rule decisions. A retroactive section sets the clock at July 2010 for existing projects (May 2012).

=== Canadian Environmental Protection Act ===
The present one-year limit to permits for disposing waste at sea can now be renewed four times. The three- and five-year time limits protecting Species at Risk from industrial harm will now be open-ended (May 2012).

=== Kyoto Protocol Implementation Act ===
"This legislation, which required government accountability and results reporting on climate change policies, is being repealed (May 2012)."

=== Fisheries Act ===
Senator Angus Cowan at the 1st Session, 41st Parliament (June 21, 2012) expressed his concerns. "There are a number of proposed changes to the Fisheries Act that are causing deep concern among Canadians. The bill amends the act to limit fish protection to the support of "commercial, recreational and Aboriginal fisheries." Protection of fish habitat is relegated to a vastly lower priority — something that caused those four former fisheries ministers, in their words, "especial alarm." Cowan also expressed dismay at the closure of Experimental Lakes Area.

Bill C-38 eliminates $2 million in annual funding to the Experimental Lakes Area in northwestern Ontario. This research centre will close within a year if a new operator cannot be found. John Smol, a biologist at Queen’s University, has said that the Experimental Lakes Area is the best-known freshwater research facility on the planet. The planned closure of the centre was the subject of an article on May 21 in Nature magazine.

— Senator Cowan 2012

According to Elizabeth May,

Fish habitat provisions will be changed to protect only fish of "commercial, Aboriginal, and recreational" value and even those habitat protections are weakened. The new provisions create an incentive to drain a lake and kill all the fish, if not in a fishery, in order to fill a dry hole with mining tailings.

— Elizabeth May 2012

In 2012 the Government of Canada closed the Department of Fisheries contaminants program and Dr. Peter Ross and 55 of his colleagues across Canada. Dr. Peter Ross was Canada's only marine mammal toxicologist. Along with his team, they spent 15 years studying "the increasing levels of toxins in oceans and in animals like the killer whale."

=== Navigable Waters Protection Act ===
"Pipelines and power lines will be exempt from the provisions of this Act. Also, the National Energy Board absorbs the Navigable Waters Protection Act (NWPA) whenever a pipeline crosses navigable waters. The NWPA is amended to say a pipeline is not a "work" within that Act (May 2012)."

=== National Energy Board Act ===
The National Energy Board Act was changed so that, "NEB reviews will be limited to two years – and then its decisions can be reversed by the Cabinet, including the present Northern Gateway Pipeline review (May 2012)."

=== Species at Risk Act (SARA) ===
The Species at Risk Act (SARA) "is being amended to exempt the National Energy Board from having to impose conditions to protect critical habitat on projects it approves. Also, companies won’t have to renew permits on projects threatening critical habitat (May 2012)." The David Suzuki Foundation argued that,

Bill C-38 removes the time limitations on permits and agreements allowing activities that affect species at risk or their habitat (previously restricted to three and five years, respectively). In addition, Bill C-38 exempts the National Energy Board, when reviewing pipeline applications, from a requirement in the Species at Risk Act to consider and seek to minimize impacts on the habitat of species at risk.

— Suzuki Foundation May 2012

=== Parks Canada Agency Act ===
"Reporting requirements are being reduced, including the annual report. 638 of the nearly 3000 Parks Canada workers will be cut. Environmental monitoring and ecological restoration in the Gulf Islands National Park are being cut (May 2012)."

=== Canadian Oil and Gas Operations Act ===
The Canadian Oil and Gas Operations Act was "changed to exempt pipelines from the Navigational Waters Protection Act (May 2012)."

=== Coasting Trade Act ===
The Coasting Trade Act was changed to promote seismic testing allowing increased off-shore drilling (May 2012)."

=== Nuclear Safety Control Act ===
The Nuclear Safety Control Act: "Environmental Assessments will be moved to the Canadian Nuclear Safety Commission, which is a licensing body not an assessing body – so there is a built-in conflict (May 2012)."

=== Canada Seeds Act ===
The Canada Seeds Act: This is being revamped so the job of inspecting seed crops is transferred from Canadian Food Inspection Agency inspectors to "authorized service providers" in the private sector (May 2012).

=== Agriculture Affected ===
"Under the Prairie Farm Rehabilitation Act, publicly owned grasslands have acted as community pastures under federal management, leasing grazing rights to farmers so they could devote their good land to crops, not livestock. This will end. Also, the Centre for Plant Health in Sidney, BC, an important site for quarantine and virus-testing on plant stock strategically located across the Salish Sea to protect BC's primary agricultural regions, will be moved to the heart of BC's fruit and wine industries (May 2012)."

=== National Round Table on the Environment and the Economy ===
The National Round Table on Environment and Economy (NRTEE), was closed down by Bill C-38. "The NRTEE brought industry leaders, environmentalists, First Nations, labour, and policy makers together to provide non-partisan research and advice on federal policies. Its demise will leave a policy vacuum in relation to Canada`s economic development (May 2012)."

=== Water Programs ===
Environment Canada is "cutting several water-related programs and others will be cut severely, including some aimed at promoting or monitoring water-use efficiency (May 2012)."

=== Wastewater Survey ===
The Municipal Water and Wastewater Survey, the "only national study of water consumption habits, is being cut after being in place since 1983 (May 2012)."

=== Monitoring Effluent ===
Environment Canada's Environmental Effects Monitoring Program, a "systematic method for measuring the quality of effluent discharge, including from mines and pulp mills, will be cut by 20 percent (May 2012)."
