= NWPP =

NWPP may stand for:

- Nepal Workers' and Peasants' Party
- Non-woven Polypropylene
- Navigable Waters Protection Program, which administered the 2002 Canadian Navigable Waters Protection Act
