= Francis William Hall =

Canadian politician

Ontario MPP
- In office 1914–1919
- Preceded by: John Charles Ebbs
- Succeeded by: William Johnston
- Constituency: Lanark South

Personal details
- Born: December 10, 1871 Perth, Ontario
- Party: Conservative
- Spouse: Margaret Elise (m. 1903)
- Occupation: Lawyer

Francis William Hall (December 10, 1871 – after 1927) was a lawyer and political figure in Ontario. He represented Lanark South in the Legislative Assembly of Ontario from 1914 to 1919 as a Conservative member.

He was born in Perth, the son of Francis Alexander Hall and Harriet F. Dunham, and was educated in Perth and at Osgoode Hall. In 1903, he married Margaret Elise, the daughter of Peter McLaren. Hall was president of the Perth Shoe Company. He served as mayor of Perth from 1909 to 1912. In 1927, Hall was found guilty of theft and sentenced to 18 months in prison.
