= Bill C-45 =

Bill C-45 is the name of various legislation introduced into the House of Commons of Canada, including:

- Jobs and Growth Act, an omnibus bill introduced in 2012 to the first session of the 41st Parliament
- Cannabis Act, introduced in 2017 to the only session of the 42nd Parliament
