= NWPA =

NWPA may refer to:

- Navigable Waters Protection Act, now known as the Navigation Protection Act, an 1882 Canadian law that regulated development affecting waterways
- Nuclear Waste Policy Act, a 1982 U.S. federal law which established a program for the disposal of radioactive waste
