= William Johnston (Ontario politician) =

Canadian politician from Ontario

William J. Johnston

Member of the Ontario Provincial Parliament for Lanark South
- In office October 20, 1919 – May 10, 1923
- Preceded by: Francis William Hall
- Succeeded by: Egerton Reuben Stedman

Personal details
- Party: United Farmers

William J. Johnston was a Canadian politician from Ontario. He represented Lanark South in the Legislative Assembly of Ontario from 1919 to 1923.

== See also ==
- 15th Parliament of Ontario
