= Lanark South (provincial electoral district) =

Canadian provincial electoral district

Ontario electoral district

Defunct provincial electoral district
- Legislature: Legislative Assembly of Ontario
- District created: 1867
- District abolished: 1933
- First contested: 1867
- Last contested: 1931

Lanark South was an electoral riding in Ontario, Canada. It was created in 1867 at the time of confederation and was abolished in 1933 before the 1934 election.

== Members of Provincial Parliament ==
Lanark South
Assembly	Years	Member	Party
1st	1867–1869	William McNairn Shaw	Conservative
1st	1869–1871	Abraham Code	Conservative
2nd	1871–1874	Abraham Code	Conservative
3rd	1875–1879	Abraham Code	Conservative
4th	1879–1883	William Lees	Conservative
5th	1883–1886	William Lees	Conservative
6th	1886–1890	William Lees	Conservative
7th	1890–1893	Nathaniel McLenaghan	Conservative
7th	1893–1894	James Maitland Clarke	Liberal
8th	1894–1898	Arthur Matheson	Conservative
9th	1898–1902	Arthur Matheson	Conservative
10th	1902–1905	Arthur Matheson	Conservative
11th	1905–1908	Arthur Matheson	Conservative
12th	1908–1911	Arthur Matheson	Conservative
13th	1911–1913	Arthur Matheson	Conservative
13th	1913–1914	John Charles Ebbs	Conservative
14th	1914–1919	Francis William Hall	Conservative
15th	1919–1923	William Johnston	United Farmers
16th	1923–1926	Egerton Reuben Stedman	Conservative
17th	1926–1929	Egerton Reuben Stedman	Conservative
18th	1929–1931	James Alexander Anderson	Conservative
18th	1931–1934	Egerton Reuben Stedman	Conservative
Sourced from the Ontario Legislative Assembly
Merged into Lanark before 1934 election

== Election results ==
Ontario provincial by-election, October 29, 1930 Death of James Alexander Anderson
Party	Candidate	Votes	%	±%
Conservative	Egerton Reuben Stedman	2,464	58.53	+1.13
Independent	William Ferguson	1,207	28.67	–
Independent	Richesson Running	539	12.80	–
Total valid votes		4,210	100.00	
Total rejected ballots		–		
Turnout		4,210	–	–
Eligible voters				
Conservative hold		Swing		+0.56
Source: Elections Ontario

1929 Ontario general election
Party	Candidate	Votes	%	±%
Conservative	James Alexander Anderson	4,308	57.40	+0.63
Liberal	J. Ernest Anderson	3,197	42.60	–0.63
Total valid votes		7,505	99.59	
Total rejected ballots		31	0.41	+0.00
Turnout		7,536	67.06	+4.58
Eligible voters		11,237		
Conservative hold		Swing		+0.63
Source: Elections Ontario

1926 Ontario general election
Party	Candidate	Votes	%	±%
Conservative	Egerton Reuben Stedman	3,870	56.77	–0.50
Liberal	Ernest H. Wickware	2,947	43.23	–
Total valid votes		6,817	99.59	
Total rejected ballots		28	0.41	–0.09
Turnout		6,845	62.49	+2.77
Eligible voters		10,954		
Conservative hold		Swing		–0.25
Source: Elections Ontario

1923 Ontario general election
Party	Candidate	Votes	%	±%
Conservative	Egerton Reuben Stedman	3,874	57.27	+19.08
United Farmers	William Johnston	2,891	42.73	–5.44
Total valid votes		6,765	99.50	
Total rejected ballots		34	0.50	–1.80
Turnout		6,799	59.71	–13.61
Eligible voters		11,386		
Conservative gain from United Farmers		Swing		+12.26
Source: Elections Ontario

1919 Ontario general election
Party	Candidate	Votes	%	±%
United Farmers	William Johnston	3,872	48.18	–
Conservative	James Simpson Gould	3,069	38.19	–15.57
Labour	Richard Grant	1,096	13.64	+5.31
Total valid votes		8,037	97.70	
Total rejected ballots		189	2.30	+1.61
Turnout		8,226	73.33	–2.91
Eligible voters		11,218		
United Farmers gain from Conservative		Swing		–2.66
Source: Elections Ontario

1914 Ontario general election
Party	Candidate	Votes	%	±%
Conservative	Francis William Hall	1,860	53.76	–6.07
Liberal	David McLean	1,312	37.92	–2.25
Labour	George William Crate	288	8.32	–
Total valid votes		3,460	99.31	
Total rejected ballots		24	0.69	+0.18
Turnout		3,484	76.24	+13.87
Eligible voters		4,570		
Conservative hold		Swing		–1.91
Source: Elections Ontario

Ontario provincial by-election, March 19, 1913 Death of Arthur Matheson
Party	Candidate	Votes	%	±%
Conservative	John Charles Ebbs	1,866	59.83	–
Liberal	David McLean	1,253	40.17	–
Total valid votes		3,119	99.49	
Total rejected ballots		16	0.51	–
Turnout		3,135	62.36	–
Eligible voters		5,027		
Conservative hold		Swing		–
Source: Elections Ontario

1911 Ontario general election
Party	Candidate	Votes
Conservative	Arthur Matheson	acclaimed
Source: Elections Ontario

1908 Ontario general election
Party	Candidate	Votes
Conservative	Arthur Matheson	acclaimed
Source: Elections Ontario

Ontario provincial by-election, February 21, 1905 Ministerial By-election, appointment as Provincial Treasurer
Party	Candidate	Votes
Conservative	Arthur Matheson	acclaimed
Source: Elections Ontario

1905 Ontario general election
Party	Candidate	Votes	%	±%
Conservative	Arthur Matheson	1,565	69.90	+6.30
Liberal	A. G. Farrell	674	30.10	–6.30
Total valid votes		2,239	100.00	
Total rejected ballots		–		
Turnout		2,239	39.61	–44.38
Eligible voters		5,653		
Conservative hold		Swing		+6.30
Source: Elections Ontario

1902 Ontario general election
Party	Candidate	Votes	%	±%
Conservative	Arthur Matheson	2,098	63.60	+2.50
Liberal	Joseph Cram	1,201	36.40	–2.50
Total valid votes		3,299	99.07	
Total rejected ballots		31	0.93	+0.76
Turnout		3,330	83.98	+16.27
Eligible voters		3,965		
Conservative hold		Swing		+2.50
Source: Elections Ontario

1898 Ontario general election
Party	Candidate	Votes	%	±%
Conservative	Arthur Matheson	2,195	61.09	+8.06
Liberal	James Maitland Clarke	1,398	38.91	+3.93
Total valid votes		3,593	99.83	
Total rejected ballots		6	0.17	+0.14
Turnout		3,599	67.71	–1.37
Eligible voters		5,315		
Conservative hold		Swing		+2.06
Source: Elections Ontario

1894 Ontario general election
Party	Candidate	Votes	%	±%
Conservative	Arthur Matheson	1,830	53.03	+18.93
Liberal	James Maitland Clarke	1,207	34.98	+0.33
Protestant Protective	James Ferguson	414	12.00	–16.95
Total valid votes		3,451	99.97	
Total rejected ballots		1	0.03	–0.54
Turnout		3,452	69.08	+13.19
Eligible voters		4,997		
Conservative gain from Liberal		Swing		+9.30
Source: Elections Ontario

Ontario provincial by-election, February 16, 1894 Resignation of Nathaniel McLenaghan
Party	Candidate	Votes	%	±%
Liberal	James Maitland Clarke	961	34.64	–6.91
Conservative	William Lees	946	34.10	–24.07
Protestant Protective	James Ferguson	803	28.95	–
Independent	A. Burrows	64	2.31	+2.04
Total valid votes		2,774	99.43	
Total rejected ballots		16	0.57	+0.07
Turnout		2,790	55.89	+1.60
Eligible voters		4,992		
Liberal gain from Conservative		Swing		+8.58
Source: Elections Ontario

1890 Ontario general election
Party	Candidate	Votes	%	±%
Conservative	Nathaniel McLenaghan	1,509	58.17	+1.73
Liberal	Duncan Kippen	1,078	41.56	–2.00
Independent	A. Burrows	7	0.27	–
Total valid votes		2,594	99.50	
Total rejected ballots		13	0.50	+0.01
Turnout		2,607	54.29	–18.70
Eligible voters		4,802		
Conservative hold		Swing		+1.87
Source: Elections Ontario

1886 Ontario general election
Party	Candidate	Votes	%	±%
Conservative	William Lees	1,836	56.44	+9.88
Liberal	F. F. Frost	1,417	43.56	–7.23
Total valid votes		3,253	99.51	
Total rejected ballots		16	0.49	–0.11
Turnout		3,269	72.99	+11.19
Eligible voters		4,479		
Conservative gain from Independent		Swing		+8.56
Source: Elections Ontario

1883 Ontario general election
Party	Candidate	Votes	%	±%
Independent	William Lees	1,089	46.56	–3.09
Liberal	E. Elliott	1,060	45.32	–
Liberal	Mr. Cameron	128	5.47	–
Independent	A. Burrows	62	2.65	–
Total valid votes		2,339	99.41	
Total rejected ballots		14	0.60	+0.60
Turnout		2,353	61.79	+5.19
Eligible voters		3,808		
Independent gain from Independent Conservative		Swing		–1.54
Source: Elections Ontario

1879 Ontario general election
Party	Candidate	Votes	%	±%
Independent Conservative	William Lees	907	49.64	
Conservative	J. Elliot	854	46.74	−6.93
Independent	Mr. Brooke	56	3.07	
Independent	W.F. Cole	10	0.55	
Total valid votes		1,827	56.60	−15.97
Eligible voters		3,228		
Independent Conservative gain from Conservative		Swing		+3.47
Source: Elections Ontario

1875 Ontario general election
Party	Candidate	Votes	%	±%
Conservative	Abraham Code	1,234	53.68	+10.80
Liberal	W. Doran	1,065	46.32	+11.33
Turnout		2,299	72.57	+6.47
Eligible voters		3,168		
Conservative hold		Swing		−0.27
Source: Elections Ontario

1871 Ontario general election
Party	Candidate	Votes	%	±%
Conservative	Abraham Code	816	42.88	−13.24
Liberal	T. Haggart	666	35.00	
Independent	Mr. Cameron	421	22.12	
Turnout		1,903	66.10	+29.46
Eligible voters		2,879		
Conservative hold		Swing		−13.24
Source: Elections Ontario

Ontario provincial by-election, February 6, 1869 Death of William McNairn Shaw
Party	Candidate	Votes	%	±%
Conservative	Abraham Code	825	56.12	−5.88
Independent	W. Doran	645	43.88	
Total valid votes		1,470	100.0	−29.56
Conservative hold		Swing		−5.88
Source: History of the Electoral Districts, Legislatures and Ministries of the Province of Ontario

1867 Ontario general election
Party	Candidate	Votes	%
Conservative	William McNairn Shaw	1,294	62.00
Liberal	Abraham Code	791	37.90
Independent	Mr. Laurie	2	0.10
Independent	Mr. Playfair	0	–
Total valid votes		2,087	70.53
Eligible voters		2,959	
Conservative pickup new district.			
Source: Elections Ontario
