= James Alexander Anderson =

Canadian politician from Ontario

Member of the Ontario Provincial Parliament for Lanark South
- In office September 30, 1929 – August 3, 1930
- Preceded by: Egerton Reuben Stedman
- Succeeded by: Egerton Reuben Stedman

Personal details
- Died: August 3, 1930
- Party: Progressive Conservative

James Alexander Anderson (died August 3, 1930) was a Canadian politician from the Progressive Conservative Party of Ontario. He represented Lanark South in the Legislative Assembly of Ontario from 1929 to 1934.

== See also ==
- 18th Parliament of Ontario
