= Sylvia McAdam Saysewahum =

Canadian Cree activist and academic

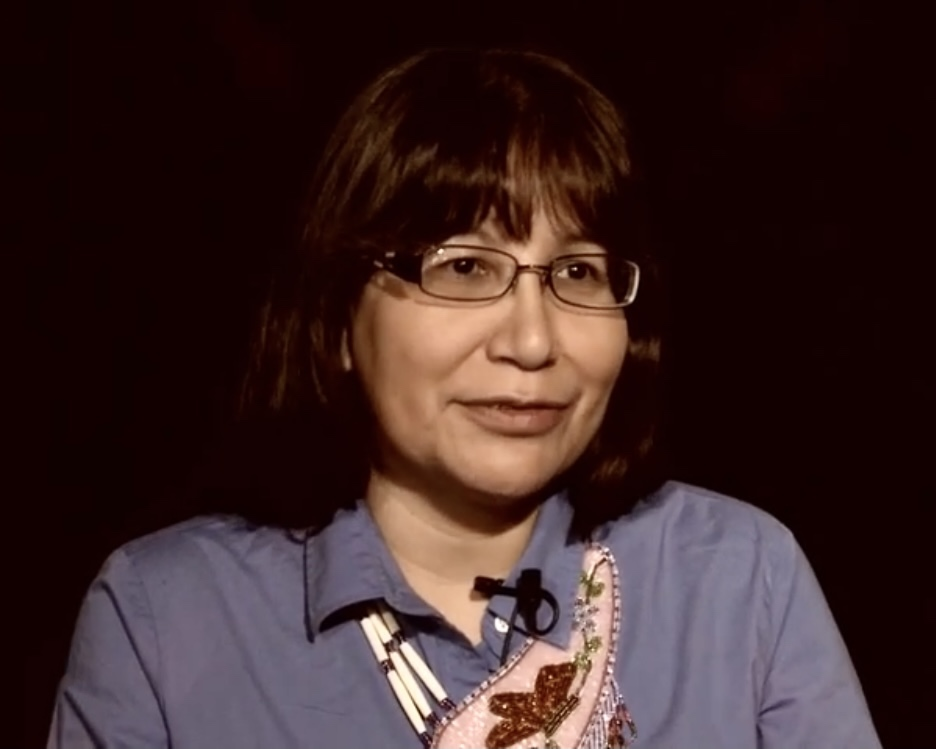
McAdam in 2013

Sylvia McAdam Saysewahum is a member of the Cree Nation. She is an advocate for First Nation and environmental rights in Canada. She is a founding member of Idle No More, a lawyer, a professor, and an author. In all of these cases, her work is focused on spreading awareness and education about First Nation and Environmental rights.

== Background ==
Sylvia McAdam was born and raised on Treaty 6 territory, and is a direct descendant of those involved with creating the original treaty. She received her bachelor's degree in human justice at the University of Regina. She is a single parent to six children. After earning her bachelors she had a variety of jobs including: social worker, radio announcer, firefighter and a resource officer with the Saskatoon Police Service. While working for the Saskatoon Police Service, Saysewahum was inspired to continue to pursue law, and so she went to the University of Saskatchewan and earned her Juris Doctor.

=== Name ===
McAdam chose to change her name. Rather than McAdam, which was a name given to her grandfather in school, she chose Saysewahum, which is her family's traditional surname

== Activism ==
Saysewahum has been involved in activism both through Idle No More and independently. Her work generally pertains to issues of First Nation and Environmental rights. She was first inspired to take action after she returned to her father's land, and found that the creeks had dried up, and what were legally First Nation's traditional hunting grounds had been blocked off and were being logged. She reacted by nailing "no trespassing" signs all around the area, but that was not enough. Shortly after her experience with the hunting grounds, she read Bill C-45, and she realized the horrible implications it would have on the environment. Because of her law background, she understood the aspect of acquiescence in law, which means that your silence can be interpreted as consent. Saysewahum understood the ramifications of silence and idleness and how they undermine First Nation rights. She talked to Nina Wilson and Jessica Gordon about the consequences of the laws proposed by Bill C-45, and together, Idle No More was born.

In 2026, Saysewahum endorsed Avi Lewis in that year's federal NDP leadership race.

=== Idle No More ===
==== Bill C-45 ====
Bill C-45 was an omnibus budget implementation bill that removed the environmental protections from many of Canada's rivers and lakes. This legislation was passed without consultation with First Nation peoples who it predominately affected. Idle No More fought against this. Their movement started as a hashtag, #IdleNoMore, to spread awareness about the issue of the bill. From there the group's coverage grew and they staged several teach-ins culminating in a flash mob on the National Day of Action. This movement was a catalysis for Indigenous groups abroad in the United States, Australia and New Zealand, used to stand up for their rights and the land.

==== One House, Many Nations ====
Since Bill C-45 protests, Idle No More has been involved in an array of issues including the housing crisis. Saysewahum became really aware of the housing disparity when she ran for chief of reserve in Big River First Nation. Though she did not win the election, she was dedicated to do something about the housing. So together Idle No More started the indiegogo campaign "One House, Many Nations." Since Saysewahum has a legal education, she can speak to the original treaty terms that included rights to shelter. She drew on this legal understanding to call the colonial government out on what they needed to be providing.

== Literary works ==
Saysewahum is the author of two books, Nationhood Interrupted: Revitalizing Nêhiyaw Legal Systems and First Nations Protocols and Methodologies. Both books are centered around the topic of Cree Law but with different purposes. Through both of these books Saysewahum develops the intricacies of First Nations. By elucidating these systems she spreads education and counters the assumption that First Nation communities are lawless. Her books demonstrate her method of advocacy work where she connects her research and education with advocacy: expanding and explaining the First Nation legal systems that are so often ignored in Canadian politics.

=== First Nations Protocols and Methodologies. ===
Saysewahum's first book, First Nations and Methodologies was originally published in 2009. When she wrote this book, it was the first time the elders had consented to having their oral laws and traditions written down. In this book, she also provides a guide to appropriate traditional etiquette for individuals attending ceremonial activities of Indigenous peoples in Saskatchewan.

=== Nationhood Interrupted: Revitalizing Nêhiyaw Legal Systems ===
This book was published in 2015. Saysewahum decided to write it after she realized that there was a lack of knowledge about indigenous law. She felt that when she brought it up in conversation most people did not even understand what she meant by indigenous law. Saysewahum suggests that cree laws are not that different from the broader Canadian laws except that they were previously unwritten and not understood. So, with her book she was able to explain this cross over. She believes the target audience for this book is everyone because it can create a template for Indigenous nations to revitalize their own laws, while also spreading education.

==== Book Reception ====
Nationhood Interrupted has received several awards:

- 2016, Winner - Aboriginal Peoples' Publishing Award, Saskatchewan Book Awards
- 2016, Short-listed - Non-Fiction Award, Saskatchewan Book Awards
- 2016, Winner - Rasmussen, Rasmussen and Charowsky Aboriginal Peoples' Writing Award, Saskatchewan Book Awards
- 2016, Winner - Regina Public Library Aboriginal Peoples' Publishing Award, Saskatchewan Book Awards
- 2016, Short-listed - University of Saskatchewan Non-Fiction Award, Saskatchewan Book Awards

== Awards and recognition ==
Sylvia McAdam/Saysewahum is the recipient of:

- The Carole Geller Human Rights Award, established by the Canadian Human Rights Reporter : this award is intended to support activists and advocates whose contributions to the improvement of rights often receive no official recognition.
- Foreign Policy's Top 100 Global Thinkers Award,
- Social Justice Award,
- 2014 Global Citizen Award,
- 2013 Social Courage Award: for exemplifying courage and honor in building and promoting a culture of peace and nonviolence in the face of political pressure and social struggle.
