= William McNairn Shaw =

Canadian politician

Ontario MPP
- In office 1867–1869
- Preceded by: Riding established
- Succeeded by: Abraham Code
- Constituency: Lanark South

Personal details
- Born: 1822 Ramsay Township, Upper Canada
- Died: December 30, 1868 (aged 46) Perth, Ontario
- Party: Conservative
- Occupation: Lawyer

William McNairn Shaw (1822 – December 30, 1868) was an Ontario lawyer and political figure. He represented Lanark South in the 1st Legislative Assembly of Ontario from 1867 to 1868 as a Conservative member.

He was born in Ramsay Township, Upper Canada in 1822, the son of John Shaw. Shaw studied law with Daniel McMartin at Perth. He died in Perth in 1868.

His brother Alexander Shaw later served in the Canadian House of Commons.

== Electoral history ==
1867 Ontario general election: Lanark South
Party	Candidate	Votes	%
Conservative	William McNairn Shaw	1,294	62.00
Liberal	Abraham Code	791	37.90
Independent	Mr. Laurie	2	0.10
Independent	Mr. Playfair	0	–
Total valid votes		2,087	70.53
Eligible voters		2,959	
Conservative pickup new district.			
Source: Elections Ontario
