= Arthur Matheson =

Canadian politician

Ontario MPP
- In office 1894–1913
- Preceded by: James Maitland Clarke
- Succeeded by: John Charles Ebbs
- Constituency: Lanark South

Personal details
- Born: December 1842 Perth, Canada West
- Died: January 25, 1913 (aged 67) Toronto, Ontario, Canada
- Party: Conservative
- Occupation: Lawyer

Military service
- Allegiance: Canadian
- Branch/service: Canadian Army
- Years of service: 1867-1890
- Rank: Lieutenant-Colonel
- Battles/wars: Fenian Raids

Arthur James Matheson (December 12, 1845 – January 25, 1913) was a Canadian lawyer and politician. He served as a Conservative Member of the Legislative Assembly of Ontario for Lanark South from 1898 to 1913, and was provincial treasurer from 1905 to 1913.

He was born in Perth, Canada West in 1845, the son of Roderick Matheson, and educated at Upper Canada College and Trinity College, Toronto. Matheson studied law, was called to the bar in 1870 and set up practice in Perth. He was mayor of Perth in 1883 and 1884. Matheson served in the local militia, including service during the Fenian raids, and became lieutenant-colonel in 1886. Other than serving as provincial treasurer, Matheson was member of various house committees, including the Standing Committee on Public Accounts. He died in office in 1913.

The geographical township of Matheson, part of Black River-Matheson Township, was named after Arthur Matheson.
