= Jobs and Growth Act =

Act of the Parliament of Canada

Parliament of Canada
- Long title: A second Act to implement certain provisions of the budget tabled in Parliament on March 29, 2012 and other measures
- Considered by: House of Commons of Canada
- Considered by: Senate of Canada
- Royal assent: December 14, 2012

Legislative history

First chamber: House of Commons of Canada
- Bill citation: Bill C-45
- Introduced by: Jim Flaherty, Minister of Finance
- First reading: October 18, 2012
- Second reading: October 31, 2012
- Third reading: December 5, 2012
- Committee report: November 26, 2012
- Status: Current legislation

The Jobs and Growth Act, 2012 (French: Loi de 2012 sur l’emploi et la croissance, informally referred to as Bill C-45) is an Act of the Parliament of Canada. It was passed in December 2012 from the second omnibus bill introduced by the Conservative government to implement its 2012 budget, following the passage of the Jobs, Growth and Long-term Prosperity Act in June 2012. Both bills attracted controversy both for their size (>450 pages each) and for the breadth of provisions contained that were not fiscally related.

== Content of the Act ==
Components of Act
Part	Division	Heading	Description
Part 1		Amendments to the Income Tax Act and related regulations	Implements certain income tax measures and related measures proposed in the March 29, 2012 budget
Part 2		Measures in respect of sales tax	Amends the Excise Tax Act and the Jobs and Economic Growth Act to implement rules applicable to the financial services sector in respect of the goods and services tax and harmonized sales tax (GST/HST)
Part 3		Federal-Provincial Fiscal Arrangements Act	Amends the act to provide the legislative authority to share with provinces and territories, and also allows the minister of finance to request from the minister of national revenue information that is necessary for the administration of the sharing of taxes with the provinces and territories.
Part 4	1	Financial institutions	Amends various Acts to allow certain public sector investment pools to directly invest in a federally regulated financial institution
Part 4	2	Shipping	Amends the Canada Shipping Act, 2001 to permit the incorporation by reference into regulations of all Canadian modifications to an international convention or industry standard that are also incorporated by reference into the regulations
Part 4	3	Preserving the stability and strength of Canada's financial sector	Amends the Canada Deposit Insurance Corporation Act to provide for a limited, automatic stay in respect of certain eligible financial contracts when a bridge institution is established. It also amends the Payment Clearing and Settlement Act to facilitate central clearing of standardized over-the-counter derivatives.
Part 4	4	Fisheries	Amends the Fisheries Act to amend the prohibition against obstructing the passage of fish and to provide that certain amounts are to be paid into the Environmental Damages Fund. It also amends the Jobs, Growth and Long-term Prosperity Act to amend the definition of Aboriginal fishery and another prohibition relating to the passage of fish. Finally, it provides transitional provisions relating to authorizations issued under the Fisheries Act before certain amendments to that Act come into force
Part 4	5	Bridge to Strengthen Trade Act	Provides for the construction of a bridge spanning the Detroit River, and excludes the application of certain other Acts.
Part 4	6	Bretton Woods and Related Agreements Act	To reflect changes made to the Articles of Agreement of the International Monetary Fund as a result of the 2010 Quota and Governance Reforms
Part 4	7	Canada Pension Plan	To implement the results of the 2010–12 triennial review
Part 4	8	Indian Act	Amends the Act to modify the voting and approval procedures in relation to proposed land designations.
Part 4	9	Judges Act	To implement the Government of Canada's response to the report of the fourth Judicial Compensation and Benefits Commission regarding salary and benefits for federally appointed judges
Part 4	10	Canada Labour Code	Various amendments relating to the calculation of holiday pay, the timelines for handling Part III complaints, and limits on periods to be covered by payment orders.
Part 4	11	Merchant Seamen Compensation Act	To transfer the powers and duties of the Merchant Seamen Compensation Board to the minister of labour and to repeal provisions that are related to the board.
Part 4	12	Customs Act	To strengthen and streamline procedures related to arrivals in Canada, to clarify the obligations of owners or operators of international transport installations to maintain port of entry facilities and to allow the Minister of Public Safety and Emergency Preparedness to require prescribed information about any person who is or is expected to be on board a conveyance.
Part 4	13	Hazardous Materials Information Review Act	To transfer the powers and functions of the Hazardous Materials Information Review Commission to the Minister of Health and to repeal provisions of that act that are related to the commission.
Part 4	14	Agreement on Internal Trade Implementation Act	It provides primarily for the enforceability of orders to pay tariff costs and monetary penalties made under Chapter 17, and also repeals subsection 28(3) of the Crown Liability and Proceedings Act.
Part 4	15	Employment Insurance Act	Amends the Act to provide a temporary measure to refund a portion of employer premiums for small businesses. An employer whose premiums were $10,000 or less in 2011 will be refunded the increase in 2012 premiums over those paid in 2011, to a maximum of $1,000.
Part 4	16	Immigration and Refugee Protection Act	To provide for an electronic travel authorization and to provide that the User Fees Act does not apply to a fee for the provision of services in relation to an application for an electronic travel authorization.
Part 4	17	Canada Mortgage and Housing Corporation Act	To remove the age limit for persons from outside the federal public administration being appointed or continuing as president or as a director of the corporation.
Part 4	18	Navigable Waters Protection Act	Amends the Act to limit its application to works in certain navigable waters that are set out in its schedule. It also amends that Act so that it can be deemed to apply to certain works in other navigable waters, with the approval of the Minister of Transport.
Part 4	19	Canada Grain Act	To replace the requirement that the operator of a licensed terminal elevator receiving grain cause that grain to be officially weighed and officially inspected by a requirement that the operator either weigh and inspect that grain or cause that grain to be weighed and inspected by a third party, plus other amendments
Part 4	20	International Interests in Mobile Equipment (Aircraft Equipment) Act	To amend the Act to modify the manner in which certain international obligations are implemented.
Part 4	21	Canadian Environmental Assessment Act, 2012	Various technical amendments to the Act
Part 4	22	Canada Employment Insurance Financing Board	Provides for the temporary suspension of the Canada Employment Insurance Financing Board Act and the dissolution of the Canada Employment Insurance Financing Board.
Part 4	23	Public Sector Pensions	Amends various Acts with respect to contribution rates.
Part 4	24	Canada Revenue Agency Act	Makes s. 112 of the Public Service Labour Relations Act (entering into a collective agreement is subject to the governor in council's approval) applicable to the Canada Revenue Agency.

== Reaction to Navigable Waters Protection Act changes ==
"The most contentious amendments to the bill were those to the Navigable Waters Protection Act, which remove thousands of lakes and streams from federal protection under that law. The Conservatives said the changes streamline regulation and remove red tape that held up projects along waterways under the guise that they would impede navigation. Opposition parties said it would remove environmental oversight over some of Canada's most treasured lakes and rivers."

The Green Party argued that Division 18 of Part 4 of Bill C-45 "weakened Canadians’ historic right to navigate the lakes, rivers, and streams of Canada without being impeded by pipelines, bridges, power lines, dams, mining and forestry equipment, and more." They argue that a body of water not mentioned in Schedule 2 on page 424, would no longer be protected from resource development by Canada's first environmental law enacted in 1882, the Navigable Waters Protection Act.

Amnesty International said "changes to the Canadian Environmental Assessment Act, the Fisheries Act, the Navigable Waters Protection Act, and the proposed Safe Drinking Water for First Nations Act have profound implications for the rights of Indigenous peoples as set out in treaties, affirmed in the constitution, and protected by international human rights standards."

[F]ederal legislative agenda that goes far beyond the Department of Aboriginal Affairs. Changes to the Canadian Environmental Assessment Act, the Fisheries Act, and the Navigable Waters Act, along with the proposed Safe Drinking Water for First Nations Act, to name only a few examples, all have profound implications for the rights of Indigenous peoples as set out in Treaties, affirmed in the Canadian Constitution, and protected by international human rights standards.

— Amnesty International

== Reaction to Indian Act changes ==
Former Prime Minister Paul Martin argued that the government failed to consult First Nations about this movement towards [privatization] and that the majority of bands were against the change to voting procedures. Martin stated that there was no debate either in parliament or with First Nations on this issue that "the bands themselves must decide." He denounced the way in which it was "simply slipped it into a budget bill."

The old way of deciding whether there could be privatization of these lands was that you had to have a double majority. You had to have majority of those who voted, and of those in the community, which is not unreasonable given low voting levels. What the government did was [to establish] that now 20 or 30 people, if they’re the only ones who voted out of a thousand, can decide the issue.

— Paul Martin

Idle No More is a protest movement formed in reaction to Bill C-45 (Division 8 of Part 4) and other concerns regarding Indigenous treaty rights.

Political scientist Tom Flanagan, who worked as advisor to Stephen Harper until 2004, argued that the modifications to voting and approval procedures in relation to proposed land designations in the Indian Act in (Division 8 of Part 4) would speed up approvals which would be advantageous to First Nations that want to lease portions of their reserves for shopping centres, industrial parks, residential developments, casinos, etc. Under the Indian Act changes to land designation for leasing "had to be approved by majority vote in a referendum or band meeting for which the quorum was a majority of members – in other words, approval by a majority of a majority. If, as usually happened, the quorum was not achieved, the Minister of Aboriginal Affairs could authorize a second meeting dispensing with the quorum." Flanagan argued that this two-stage process was both costly and time consuming.
