= Egerton Reuben Stedman =

Canadian politician from Ontario

Member of the Ontario Provincial Parliament for Lanark South
- In office October 29, 1930 – April 3, 1934
- Preceded by: James Alexander Anderson
- Succeeded by: Constituency dissolved
- In office June 25, 1923 – October 18, 1926
- Preceded by: William Johnston
- Succeeded by: James Alexander Anderson

Personal details
- Born: August 23, 1872; Lanark County, Ontario, Canada
- Died: April 20, 1946 (aged 73); Perth, Lanark County, Ontario, Canada
- Political party: Progressive Conservative

Egerton Reuben Stedman (23 August 1872 – 20 April 1946) was a Canadian politician from the Progressive Conservative Party of Ontario. He represented Lanark South in the Legislative Assembly of Ontario from 1923 to 1926, and 1930 to 1934.

== See also ==
- 18th Parliament of Ontario
