= John Charles Ebbs =

Canadian politician from Ontario

Member of the Ontario Provincial Parliament for Lanark South
- In office March 19, 1913 – May 29, 1914
- Preceded by: Arthur Matheson
- Succeeded by: Francis William Hall

Personal details
- Party: Conservative

John Charles Ebbs was a Canadian politician from Ontario. He represented Lanark South in the Legislative Assembly of Ontario from a 1913 by-election to 1914.

== See also ==
- 13th Parliament of Ontario
