= John Godfrey Spragge =

Canadian lawyer and judge

The Honourable John Godfrey Spragge
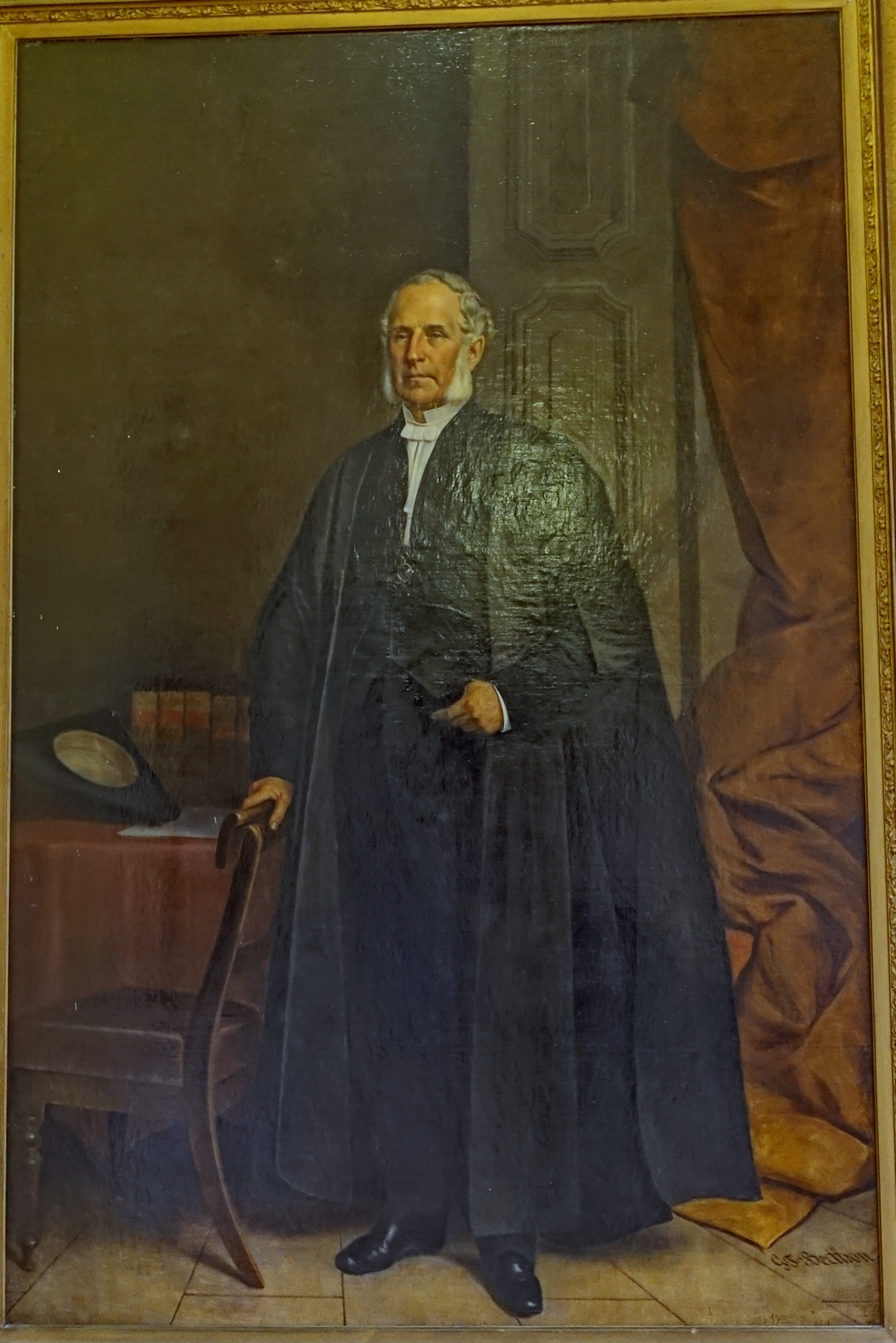

Chief Justice of Ontario
- In office 1881–1884
- Preceded by: Thomas Moss
- Succeeded by: Sir John Hawkins Hagarty

Personal details
- Born: 6 September 1806 New Cross, Lewisham, England
- Died: 20 April 1884 (aged 77) Toronto, Ontario, Canada

John Godfrey Spragge (September 6, 1806 – April 20, 1884) was a Canadian lawyer and judge.

Born in New Cross, Lewisham, England, he emigrated to Upper Canada in 1820 with his father, Joseph Spragge. He was called to the bar of Upper Canada in 1828 and practised law in York (now Toronto). In May 1881, he was appointed chief justice of the Court of Appeal for Ontario (the title was changed later in the year to chief justice of Ontario). He served until his death in 1884.

Spragge as a justice on Ontario Court of Appeal presided over McLaren v Caldwell where he held that Ontario law made all streams, whether naturally or artificially floatable, public waterways. On appeal to the Supreme Court of Canada, the Court of Appeal's decision was reversed on the grounds that:

- the streams in question were not floatable without the aid of artificial improvements,
- the appellant had at common law the exclusive right to use his property as he pleased, and to prevent respondents from using as a highway the stream in question where it flowed through appellant's private property,
- as held in the 1863 decision in Boale v. Dickson, the Ontario statute in question extends only to such streams as would, in their natural state, without improvements, during freshets, permit saw logs, timber, etc., to be floated down them.
