= McLaren v Caldwell =

Privy Council judicial decision

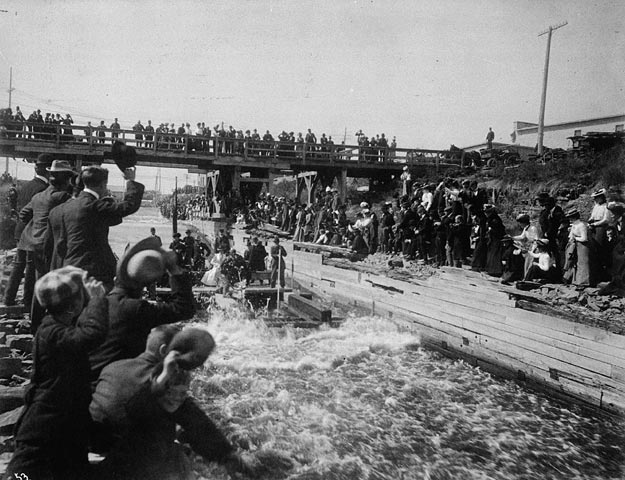
- The Duke and Duchess of York running the Chaudière timber slide on a timber crib, Ottawa, Ontario, 1901
- Court: Judicial Committee of the Privy Council
- Full case name: Caldwell and another v McLaren
- Decided: 7 April 1884
- Citation: [1884] UKPC 21, (1884) 9 AC 392

Case history
- Prior actions: McLaren v. Caldwell, 1882 CanLII 3, 8 SCR 435 (28 November 1882), reversing McLaren v. Caldwell et al., 6 Ont. App. Rep. 456 (8 July 1881). and restoring a decree of the Court of Chancery of Ontario
- Appealed from: Supreme Court of Canada

Court membership
- Judges sitting: Lord Blackburn; Sir Barnes Peacock; Sir Robert Collier; Sir Richard Couch; Sir Arthur Hobhouse

Case opinions
- Since 1849, the law in what is now Ontario has made public waterways of all streams, whether they are naturally or artificially floatable. Judgment of the Supreme Court of Canada should be reversed, and that of the Ontario Court of Appeal restored.
- Decision by: Lord Blackburn

Keywords
- free use of waterways, provincial jurisdiction

McLaren v Caldwell was a landmark decision of the Judicial Committee of the Privy Council that upheld provincial jurisdiction in matters of a local or private nature, as well as over property and civil rights. It has been described as "a decision in a non-constitutional legal context that had indirect non-legal, but profound, constitutional consequences."

== Background ==
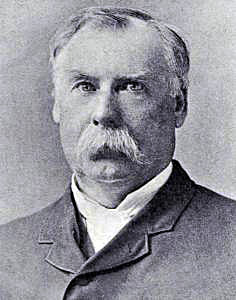
Peter McLaren, one of the parties in the case.

The case arose from a controversy that came to be known as the "Lumbermen's Feud". Peter McLaren owned a lumber mill and had added timber slides on the Mississippi river and its northern tributaries that flowed through land that he owned in Lanark County, Ontario, in order to provide for transporting his own logs. Boyd Caldwell owned a rival mill, and was attempting to drive 18,000 logs through those slides. McLaren sued Caldwell's firm, B. Caldwell & Son, to restrain them from passing or floating timber and saw logs through his slides.

Caldwell claimed that McLaren was unable to prevent the use of the river for the passage of his logs because of the statutes in force in Ontario. McLaren, however, asserted that he had the right to do so under the common law.

In support of Caldwell, Ontario Premier Oliver Mowat arranged the passage of the Rivers and Streams Act, 1881 which required the unobstructed passage of logs, timber, rafts, etc. down all waterways in the province, whether improved or not, subject to the payment of any reasonable tolls. This Act was disallowed by the federal government under John A. Macdonald on the grounds that it infringed upon private property rights. This conflict added fuel to the ongoing quarrel between the federal and provincial governments; the bill was re-enacted and disallowed again in 1882 and 1883.

In an 1882 debate in the Legislative Assembly of Ontario, Mowat maintained that the Rivers and Streams Bill fell wholly within provincial jurisdiction, and asserted that federal disallowance could only take place:

1. when the Act is altogether illegal or unconstitutional,
2. when illegal or unconstitutional in part,
3. in cases of concurrent jurisdiction as clashing with the legislation of the General Parliament
4. when it affects the interests of the Dominion Parliament.

== The courts below ==
On initial application to the Court of Chancery of Ontario, Vice-Chancellor Proudfoot granted the interlocutory injunction that was requested. That injunction was overturned on appeal to the Ontario Court of Appeal.

The Court of Chancery of Ontario, in Vice-Chancellor Proudfoot's subsequent decision on 16 December 1880, held that Caldwell could not drive his logs as the streams were found not to have been navigable or floatable for saw logs or other timber, rafts, and crafts when in a state of nature, and issued the appropriate injunction.

Appeal was allowed by the Ontario Court of Appeal, where Chief Justice Spragge held that Ontario law made all streams, whether naturally or artificially floatable, public waterways.

On appeal to the Supreme Court of Canada, the Court of Appeal's decision was reversed on the grounds that:

- the streams in question were not floatable without the aid of artificial improvements,
- the appellant had at common law the exclusive right to use his property as he pleased, and to prevent respondents from using as a highway the stream in question where it flowed through appellant’s private property,
- as held in the 1863 decision in Boale v. Dickson, the Ontario statute in question extends only to such streams as would, in their natural state, without improvements, during freshets, permit saw logs, timber, etc., to be floated down them.

== Appeal to the Privy Council ==
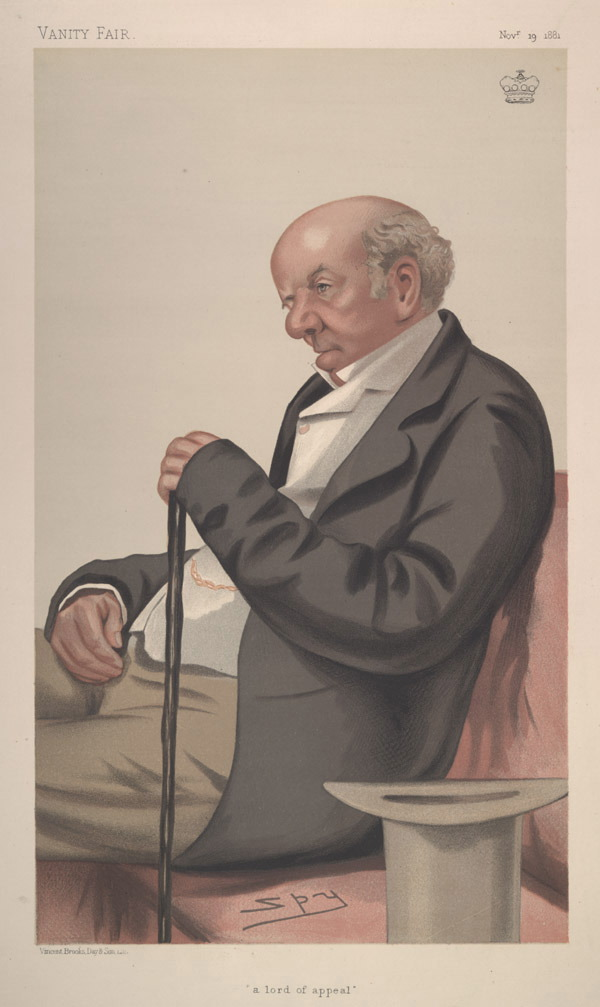
Caricature of Lord Blackburn, author of the JCPC ruling.

The Privy Council held in favour of Caldwell, ruling that the decision of the Ontario Court of Appeal (stating that the Upper Canada Act had been misconstrued as to its effect in Boale v. Dickson) was correct. After reviewing Upper Canada's laws in the matter that had been enacted as early as 1828, it further declared:

And their Lordships agree with the Judges of the Court of Appeal for Ontario in thinking that there is nothing to justify any Court in construing the words "all streams" as meaning such streams only as are at all places floatable. They do not think that every little rill, not capable of floating even a bullrush, is a stream within the meaning of the Act. But when once it is shown that there is a sufficient body of water above and below the spot where the natural impediment exists, though that natural impediment renders the stream at that spot practically unfloatable, it does not make it cease to be a part of the stream in the ordinary sense of the words.

== Aftermath ==
As a result of the Privy Council's ruling, the Legislative Assembly of Ontario passed the Rivers and Streams Act, 1884, which the federal government decided not to disallow. In order to assert its own jurisdiction, the Parliament of Canada subsequently passed the Navigable Waters Protection Act. Subsequent legislation on the issue had mixed results.

McLaren v Caldwell established the principle in Canadian law that waterways are open to all, and that while private interests can charge a reasonable amount for the use of any improvements they have made, they cannot refuse passage to anyone. The victory was essentially a political one - Mowat's refusal to back down in the face of Macdonald’s intransigence made it more difficult for the federal government to disallow legislation that clearly fell under provincial jurisdiction, and led Macdonald increasingly to send matters to the courts. Essentially, disallowance was considered to be inconsistent with the rule of law, as well as being incompatible with the political conception of Canadian federalism.

The Judicial Committee of the Privy Council, in turn, increasingly ruled in favour of the provinces, with a broad interpretation of what constituted local matters. In that regard, it has been estimated that, in its history, the Judicial Committee overturned about half of all appeals from the Supreme Court of Canada, while only overturning about a quarter of all appeals from other Canadian courts.
