= Peter McLaren (politician) =

Canadian politician

The Honourable Peter McLaren
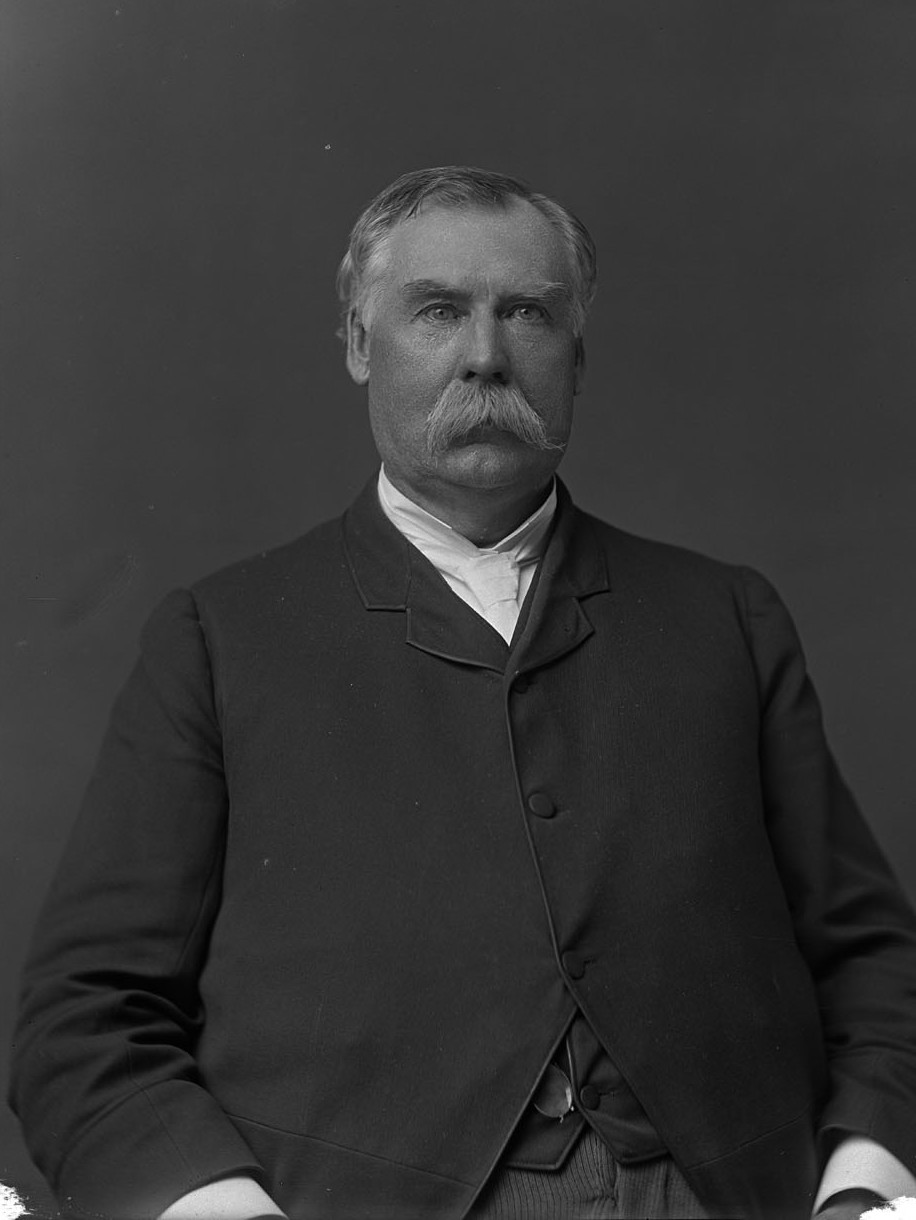

Canadian Senator from Ontario
- In office February 21, 1890 – May 23, 1919
- Appointed by: John A. Macdonald

Personal details
- Born: September 21, 1833 Lanark, Upper Canada
- Died: May 23, 1919 (aged 85) Perth, Ontario, Canada
- Party: Conservative
- Spouse: Sophia Lees
- Occupation: Businessman; politician
- Known for: McLaren v Caldwell

Peter McLaren (September 21, 1833 – May 23, 1919) was a Canadian politician and Senator from Ontario. McLaren was the Plaintiff in McLaren v Caldwell, that resulted in the landmark decision of the Judicial Committee of the Privy Council that upheld provincial jurisdiction in matters of a local or private nature, as well as over property and civil rights.

== Early life ==
McLaren was born in Lanark, Upper Canada, on September 21, 1833. He was the son of James McLaren, an immigrant from Scotland. He married Sophia, the daughter of Conservative politician William Lees and granddaughter of Andrew W. Playfair.

== Business life ==
McLaren was involved in the timber trade and operated sawmills in Carleton Place, at McLaren's depot on the Kingston and Pembroke Railway line, and Alberta.

=== Rivers and Streams Act ===
In 1881, the 4th Ontario parliament passed the Rivers and Streams Act, mainly due to a dispute between McLaren and a rival lumber company over access to McLaren's timber slides on the Mississippi River. The enactment gave the right to individuals to flow logs down rivers, creeks, and streams, and allowed those who made improvements along a river to receive a toll set by the lieutenant governor from others floating logs down a river. The John A. Macdonald government disallowed the Ontario law. The report on disallowance cited removal of property rights from individuals down river who would be forced to become "toll-keeper against his will," which amounted to taking away the "rights of one man and vest them in another" which a legislatures power to do so was deemed "exceedingly doubtful." The decision to disallow the Act went against the principles of disallowance Macdonald previously authored in 1868, and was protested by the Premier of Ontario, Oliver Mowat, and opposition in Parliament, including Wilfrid Laurier. Further accusations came from the opposition, claiming the decision was motivated, as McLaren, who petitioned for disallowance, was a known political friend of Macdonald. Macdonald's conservative government was unsuccessful at arguing that this disallowance aligned with previous decisions, and conservative Dalton McCarthy conceded in parliament that the disallowance was based on a new principle. Macdonald defended the decision on the concept of protecting property rights and was within the general interest of the Dominion to maintain those rights to ensure continued certainty in investment. Gérard La Forest believed the report authorizing the disallowance was not authored by Justice Minister James McDonald but was written by John A. Macdonald, as McDonald would cease his role as justice minister only a few days after its publication.

The Ontario legislature protested the disallowance and passed the same Act three more times, all of which were disallowed, and finally, in 1884, a fourth attempt, which was not disallowed and continued as law. The issue was settled in the landmark case McLaren v Caldwell by the Judicial Committee of the Privy Council, which upheld the enactment.

== Political life ==
McLaren was appointed to the Senate of Canada in 1890 on the advice of John Alexander Macdonald, representing the senatorial division of Perth, Ontario. A Conservative, he served 29 years until he died in 1919.

== Death ==
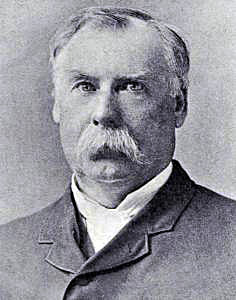
Peter McLaren in 1906

McLaren died in Perth on May 23, 1919. His estate was valued at $15 million.

In 1962, Mount McLaren in Alberta's Canadian Rockies was named in his honor.
