= James Maitland Clarke =

Canadian politician

Member of the Ontario Provincial Parliament for Lanark South
- In office February 16, 1894 – May 5, 1894
- Preceded by: Nathaniel McLenaghan
- Succeeded by: Arthur Matheson

Personal details
- Party: Liberal

James Maitland Clarke was a Canadian politician from Ontario. He represented Lanark South in the Legislative Assembly of Ontario after winning a by-election.

== See also ==
- 7th Parliament of Ontario
