= Abraham Code =

Canadian politician

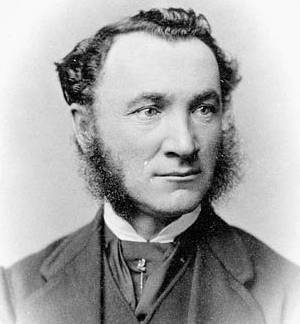

Ontario MPP
- In office 1869–1879
- Preceded by: William McNairn Shaw
- Succeeded by: William Lees
- Constituency: Lanark South

Personal details
- Born: December 28, 1828 Lanark Highlands, Ontario
- Died: March 23, 1898 (aged 69) Ottawa, Ontario
- Party: Conservative
- Occupation: Businessman

Abraham Code (December 28, 1828 – March 23, 1898) was an Ontario businessman and political figure. He represented Lanark South in the Legislative Assembly of Ontario from 1869 to 1879.

He was born in Lanark Township in 1828 and educated there. He served as reeve for Drummond Township from 1860 to 1875. Code built a large woollen mill at Carleton Place in 1871; he was forced to close it due to financial difficulties in 1878. He was elected to the provincial legislature in an 1869 by-election held after the death of William McNairn Shaw. Code joined the federal Ministry of Internal Revenue as an Inspector of Weights and Measures in 1880. He died in Ottawa in 1898. He is buried in Beechwood Cemetery.

== Electoral history ==
1867 Ontario general election: Lanark South
Party	Candidate	Votes	%
Conservative	William McNairn Shaw	1,294	62.00
Liberal	Abraham Code	791	37.90
Independent	Mr. Laurie	2	0.10
Independent	Mr. Playfair	0	–
Total valid votes		2,087	70.53
Eligible voters		2,959	
Conservative pickup new district.			
Source: Elections Ontario

Ontario provincial by-election, February 6, 1869: Lanark South Death of William McNairn Shaw
Party	Candidate	Votes	%	±%
Conservative	Abraham Code	825	56.12	−5.88
Independent	W. Doran	645	43.88	
Total valid votes		1,470	100.0	−29.56
Conservative hold		Swing		−5.88
Source: History of the Electoral Districts, Legislatures and Ministries of the Province of Ontario

1871 Ontario general election: Lanark South
Party	Candidate	Votes	%	±%
Conservative	Abraham Code	816	42.88	−13.24
Liberal	T. Haggart	666	35.00	
Independent	Mr. Cameron	421	22.12	
Turnout		1,903	66.10	+29.46
Eligible voters		2,879		
Conservative hold		Swing		−13.24
Source: Elections Ontario

1875 Ontario general election: Lanark South
Party	Candidate	Votes	%	±%
Conservative	Abraham Code	1,234	53.68	+10.80
Liberal	W. Doran	1,065	46.32	+11.33
Turnout		2,299	72.57	+6.47
Eligible voters		3,168		
Conservative hold		Swing		−0.27
Source: Elections Ontario
