= Nathaniel McLenaghan =

Canadian politician

Arthur Matheson

Ontario MPP
- In office 1890–1893
- Preceded by: William Lees
- Succeeded by: James Maitland Clarke
- Constituency: Lanark South

Personal details
- Born: November 11, 1841 Drummond Township, Canada West
- Died: September 26, 1912 (aged 70) Perth, Drummond Township, Ontario
- Party: Conservative
- Occupation: Cattle merchant

Nathaniel McLenaghan (November 11, 1841 – September 26, 1912) was an Ontario merchant and political figure. He represented Lanark South in the Legislative Assembly of Ontario from 1890 to 1893 as a Conservative member.

He was born in Drummond Township, Canada West in 1841, the son of Irish immigrants, and educated in Perth. He taught school for several years before becoming involved in exporting cattle. McLenaghan served on the town council for Perth. He was named deputy customs collector at Perth in 1893 and customs collector in 1897.

He died at Perth in 1912.
