= William Lees =

Canadian politician

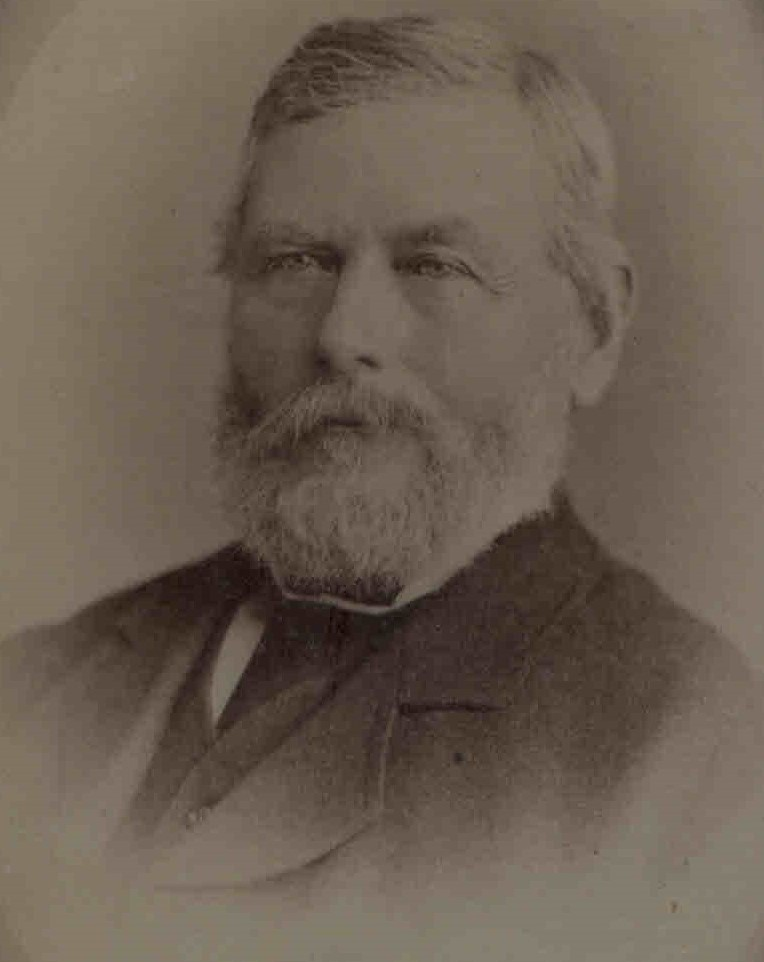

Ontario MPP
- In office 1879–1890
- Preceded by: Abraham Code
- Succeeded by: Nathaniel McLenaghan
- Constituency: Lanark South

Personal details
- Born: November 21, 1821 Bathurst Township, Lanark County, Upper Canada
- Died: February 3, 1903 (aged 81) Bathurst Township, Lanark County, Ontario
- Party: Conservative
- Spouse(s): Mary Playfair, Margaret Ward, Annie Irvine Laurie, Elizabeth Harriet Smith
- Occupation: Farmer • merchant • politician

Military service
- Branch/service: Permanent Active Militia
- Years of service: 1867-1875
- Rank: Captain

William Lees (November 21, 1821 – February 3, 1903) was an Ontario farmer, merchant and political figure. He represented Lanark South in the Legislative Assembly of Ontario as an independent Conservative and then a Conservative from 1879 to 1890.

== Early life ==
Lees was born in Bathurst Township, Lanark County, Upper Canada in 1821, the son of Scottish immigrants. Father, William Lees, and mother, Barbara Lees née Tait, had emigrated from Scotland in 1817. They settled as pioneer farmers in the Township of Bathurst in the county of Lanark, Ontario.

== Career ==
Lees began work as a farmer, later building a sawmill and a gristmill. He was named a justice of the peace in 1852. Lees served on the township and county councils from 1856 and served as reeve and county warden from 1874-1876. Lees also served as captain in the local militia. He was a Third Degree member of the local Masonic lodge.

As a politician Lees was a liberal conservative, quite liberal in his views and feelings, who paid close attention to his legislative duties. He did not believe there could be good legislation where extensive partyism exists.

For several years he was President of the Conservative Association; and took an active part in agricultural matters, and was for two years president of the agricultural society of his riding.

== Personal life ==
Lees married Mary Playfair, the daughter of Colonel Andrew W. Playfair in 1844 and they had four children. After she died he then married Margaret Ward in 1857 who bore him two children. When his second wife died, Lees married school teacher Annie Irvine Laurie in 1868. They had five children before she also died. Lees fourth and final wife was Staffordshire-born Elizabeth Harriet Curtis née Smith, whom he married in 1886.

His eldest daughter, Sophia Elizabeth, married Peter McLaren, who later served in the Senate. His eldest son, William Robert, was one of the founders of Pincher Creek, Alberta. His youngest son, Frederick William, served as a lieutenant colonel during World War II. In total Lees had eleven children, four daughters and seven sons, by his first three wives.

== Death ==
Lees died on 3 February 1903 in Bathurst, at the age of 81 years. His fourth wife, Elizabeth Harriet, outlived him by eight years, dying in 1911.

== Electoral history ==
1879 Ontario general election: Lanark South
Party	Candidate	Votes	%	±%
Independent Conservative	William Lees	907	49.64	
Conservative	J. Elliot	854	46.74	−6.93
Independent	Mr. Brooke	56	3.07	
Independent	W.F. Cole	10	0.55	
Total valid votes		1,827	56.60	−15.97
Eligible voters		3,228		
Independent Conservative gain from Conservative		Swing		+3.47
Source: Elections Ontario
