= Andrew W. Playfair =

Andrew William Playfair (1790 – September 1868) was a military man and politician in Canada West.

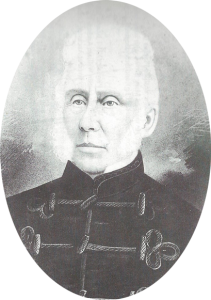
Lieutenant-Colonel Andrew William Playfair of Playfairville

Playfair was born in Paris, France, in 1790, the son of William Playfair. He served in the British Army and later settled near Perth, Ontario. He built a number of mills which formed the basis of the community of Playfairville on the Mississippi River, northwest of Perth. He was elected to the Legislative Assembly of the Province of Canada for the South riding of Lanark in 1857. Years later after Ontario was established, his son-in-law, William Lees, was a representative of the same district. Playfair served as Colonel in the local militia. He died in Playfairville in 1868.
