= Paul Bunyan Mall =

- Location: Bemidji, Minnesota, United States
- Coordinates: 47.4949°N 94.89941°W
- Opened: 1977
- Developer: Developers Diversified, Inc.
- Manager: Lexington Realty
- Architect: Rauenhorst Corporation
- Num. of stores: 32
- Num. of anchor tenants: 5 (2 anchor spaces subdivided for 2 anchors)
- Floor area: 297,803 square feet (27,666.8 m^{2})
- Floors: 1
- Parking: 1,000
- Website: paulbunyanmall.com

Paul Bunyan Mall is a regional shopping mall in Bemidji, Minnesota. The mall's anchor stores are Hobby Lobby, Kohl's, JCPenney, Dunham's Sports, and Harbor Freight Tools.

Paul Bunyan Mall was developed by Cleveland-based Developers Diversified, Inc. Twin Cities-based Rauenhorst Corporation (originally Rauenhorst Construction Company) both designed the mall and served as general contractor on the project. The mall is located off Paul Bunyan Drive in Bemidji just south of the "Ridgeway" development.

The mall was first proposed in 1976 and opened in 1977 with JCPenney, Kmart and Minnesota-based Bostwick's as its anchor stores. Bostwick's became Herberger's in the mid-1990s. The Kmart store closed in 2012; the space was subdivided in 2016 for Hobby Lobby and Kohl's. On April 18, 2018, it was announced that Herberger's would be closing as parent company The Bon-Ton Stores was going out of business. The store closed on August 29, 2018. The space would later be subdivided for Dunham's Sports and Harbor Freight Tools.
