= Omnibus bill =

Proposed law that covers a number of diverse or unrelated topics

An omnibus bill (or omnibus law) is a proposed law that covers a number of diverse or unrelated topics. Omnibus is derived from Latin and means "to, for, by, with or from everything". An omnibus bill is a single document that is accepted in a single vote by a legislature but packages together several measures into one or combines diverse subjects.

Many legislatures may have a tradition of extensive deliberation and debate prior to the adoption of laws, which can postpone passage of necessary legislation. Thus, in order to pass all desired laws within a reasonable timeframe, they are consolidated into a single bill and voted on quickly, typically near the end of a legislative session.

Because of their large size and scope, omnibus bills limit opportunities for debate and scrutiny on the actual final bill. Historically, omnibus bills have sometimes been used to pass controversial amendments. For this reason, some consider omnibus bills to be anti-democratic; one notable instance of its passage, that in Indonesia, triggered nationwide protests which lasted for four years.

== Indonesia ==
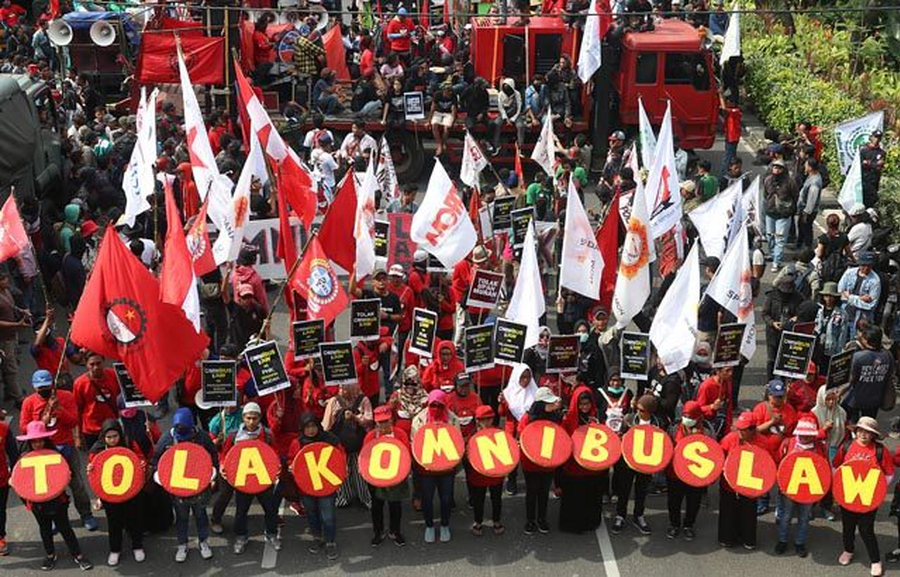
A scene from one of the many protests held between 2020 and 2024 against the passage of the Omnibus Law

In October 2020, the People's Representative Council of Indonesia passed the Omnibus Law on Job Creation, a highly controversial omnibus law that aims to attract foreign investment and reduce business regulation. Opponents say that the law would massively benefit business owners, conglomerates, investors at the expense of the common folk, harm the environment by fast-tracking deforestation, and threaten labor rights in the existing law. As a result, its passing triggered nationwide protests and riots which lasted for nearly four years involving both workers and students.

== United States ==
In the United States, omnibus bills are sometimes known as "Big Ugly" bills. Examples include reconciliation bills, combined appropriations bills, and private relief and claims bills.

=== Appropriations legislation ===
Omnibus legislation is routinely used by the United States Congress to group together the budgets of all departments in one year in an omnibus spending bill. For example, the Omnibus Budget Reconciliation Act of 1993 was designed to help reduce the federal deficit by approximately $496 billion over five years through restructuring of the tax code.

=== Historical examples ===
During the 19th century, there were three notable omnibus bills in the US.

The Compromise of 1850 had five disparate provisions designed by Senator Henry Clay of Kentucky. His purpose was to pacify sectional differences that threatened to provoke the secession of the slave states. The Fugitive Slave Act was the most infamous of the five compromise components, and was almost universally excoriated by abolitionists, the chief exception being Sen. Daniel Webster of Massachusetts who prioritized preservation of the Union. Senator Thomas Hart Benton, a Missouri slaveholder, opposed the omnibus compromise as an "unmanageable mass of incongruous bills, each an impediment to the other...." While this bill did not pass as the official Compromise of 1850, it got the ball rolling. To satisfy members of Congress, Stephen A. Douglas separated the Compromise back into 5 separate bills and got it passed. Ultimately, disunion and civil war were delayed for a decade. In response, the 1861 Constitution of the Confederate States would ban omnibus legislation, requiring that every bill "shall relate to but one subject, and that shall be expressed in the title" (Article 1, Section 9.20).

The Omnibus Act of June 1868 admitted seven southern U.S. states as having satisfied the requirements of the Reconstruction Acts.

The Enabling Act of 1889 provided for the admission of four new states to the Union — North Dakota, South Dakota, Montana and Washington.

== Canada ==
In Canada, one famous omnibus bill became the Criminal Law Amendment Act, 1968–69, a 126-page, 120-clause amendment to the Criminal Code passed under the leadership of Pierre Elliot Trudeau who was then Justice Minister in the government of Lester Pearson. This Act changed the law of the land in matters as diverse as homosexuality, prostitution, abortion, gambling, gun control and drunk driving.

Likewise, there was the Jobs and Growth Act (2012) whose passage was not massively criticised and protested against unlike its Indonesian counterpart.

The SNC-Lavalin affair, which entailed the censure of Justin Trudeau by the Parliamentary Ethics Commissioner, was started when the firm suggested to Trudeau that he include in his spring 2018 budget bill the deferred prosecution agreement measure that then-Attorney-General Wilson-Raybould refused to sanction, culminating in her January 2019 ouster from government and the subsequent scandal that surrounded it.

The Greenhouse Gas Pollution Pricing Act was created during the 42nd Parliament of Canada under the mask of the Budget Implementation Act, 2018, No. 1 in Part 4. The SNC-Lavalin affair was created as Division 20 of Part 6.

== European Union ==
Following the Draghi report on economic competitiveness, the EU in 2025 launched several thematic omnibus bills. Their purpose is to simplify EU legislation to retain and attract investment.

They are procedurally fast-tracked and exempted from ex ante impact assessments.

== Other jurisdictions ==
In the Republic of Ireland, the Second Amendment of the Constitution was an omnibus constitutional law, enacted in 1941, that made many unrelated changes to the country's fundamental law.

In Serbia, Omnibus law was adopted in 2002 that regulated the autonomous status of Vojvodina.

Similarly, in New Zealand, an omnibus bill was passed in November 2016 that enacted legislation required for New Zealand to enter the Trans Pacific Partnership.

Section 55 of the Constitution of Australia requires that laws imposing taxation "deal only with the imposition of taxation" and "deal with one subject of taxation only" (except those relating to customs and excise); other purported provisions in a piece of tax legislation are of no legal effect. This does not outlaw all omnibus bills, but renders unconstitutional any omnibus bill imposing taxation.

In France, acronyms are used in legal jargon for regular pieces of legislation making “various provisions…” (diverses dispositions…), such as a loi DDOS (“making various provisions of social character”), loi DDOEF (“making various provisions of economic and fiscal character”), or loi DDADUE (“making various provisions transposing European Union law”).

== See also ==
- Omnibus law (Serbia)
- One Big Beautiful Bill Act
- Single-subject rule
