= Canadian Navigable Waters Act =

Law of Canada

Parliament of Canada
- Citation: R.S.C., 1985, c. N-22
- Enacted by: Parliament of Canada
- Royal assent: 17 May 1882

Amended by
- R.S.C. 1985, c. 1 (2nd Supp.); S.C. 1993, c. 41; 1997, c. 10; 2004, c. 15; 2009, c. 2; 2012, c. 31; 2019, c. 28

The Canadian Navigable Waters Act (French: Loi sur les eaux navigables canadiennes, formerly the Navigation Protection Act and beforehand the Navigable Waters Protection Act) is one of the oldest regulatory statutes enacted by the Parliament of Canada. It requires approval for any works that may affect navigation on navigable waters in Canada.

== History ==
Following the decision of the Judicial Committee of the Privy Council in McLaren v. Caldwell, the Parliament asserted its jurisdiction by enacting An Act respecting Bridges over the navigable waters, constructed under the authority of Provincial Acts, which received royal assent on 17 May 1882. Originally extending only to the construction of bridges, its scope was enlarged in 1883 to cover bridges, booms, dams and causeways, and in 1886 to cover wharves, docks, piers and other structures. These provisions were consolidated in the publication of the Revised Statutes of Canada, 1886. It was assigned the short title of the Navigable Waters Protection Act on the publication of the Revised Statutes of Canada, 1906.

From 1882 to 1966, the Act was administered by the Department of Public Works.

By 2002, it was described as a "federal statute designed to protect the public’s right to navigation and marine safety in the navigable waters of Canada." The Act was "administered by the Navigable Waters Protection Program (NWPP) under the Canadian Coast Guard (CCG) of the Department of Fisheries and Oceans.

In 2004, responsibility for the Act was transferred to Transport Canada.

The Canadian Coast Guard (CCG) may also be consulted regarding navigation issues.

== Application ==
Works that affect navigation are subject to federal approval under the Act, which is generally coordinated with corresponding provincial approvals (as the beds of navigable waters are generally reserved to the Crown in right of the province)

The Act was amended in March 2009 in order to simplify procedures. As a consequence, the Minor Works and Waters Order was passed to provide for exempting minor works and waters from the Act's application.

In 2012, the Act was amended by the Jobs and Growth Act, 2012 to provide for:

- the limitation of the Act’s application to works in certain navigable waters that are set out in its schedule,
- it to be deemed to apply to certain works in other navigable waters, with the approval of the Minister of Transport,
- an assessment process for certain works and to provide that works that are assessed as likely to substantially interfere with navigation require the Minister’s approval, and
- administrative monetary penalties and additional offences.

The amendments came into force in April 2014.

The Bridge To Strengthen Trade Act exempts the construction of the new Detroit River International Crossing from the scope of the Act.

=== Scope of the Act ===
In Friends of the Oldman River Society v. Canada, La Forest J of the Supreme Court of Canada considered what the proper scope of federal jurisdiction with respect to environmental matters, and declared:

This gives some insight into the scope of Parliament's legislative jurisdiction over railways and the manner in which it is charged with the responsibility of weighing both the national and local socio-economic ramifications of its decisions. Moreover, it cannot be seriously questioned that Parliament may deal with biophysical environmental concerns touching upon the operation of railways so long as it is legislation relating to railways. This could involve issues such as emission standards or noise abatement provisions.

To continue with the example, one might postulate the location and construction of a new line which would require approval under the relevant provisions of the Railway Act. That line may cut through ecologically sensitive habitats such as wetlands and forests. The possibility of derailment may pose a serious hazard to the health and safety of nearby communities if dangerous commodities are to be carried on the line. On the other hand, it may bring considerable economic benefit to those communities through job creation and the multiplier effect that will have in the local economy. The regulatory authority might require that the line circumvent residential districts in the interests of noise abatement and safety. In my view, all of these considerations may validly be taken into account in arriving at a final decision on whether or not to grant the necessary approval. To suggest otherwise would lead to the most astonishing results, and it defies reason to assert that Parliament is constitutionally barred from weighing the broad environmental repercussions, including socio-economic concerns, when legislating with respect to decisions of this nature.

The same can be said for several other subject matters of legislation, including one of those before the Court, namely navigation and shipping. Some provisions of the Navigable Waters Protection Act are aimed directly at biophysical environmental concerns that affect navigation. Sections 21 and 22 read:

21. No person shall throw or deposit or cause, suffer or permit to be thrown or deposited any sawdust, edgings, slabs, bark or like rubbish of any description whatever that is liable to interfere with navigation in any water, any part of which is navigable or that flows into any navigable water.

22. No person shall throw or deposit or cause, suffer or permit to be thrown or deposited any stone, gravel, earth, cinders, ashes or other material or rubbish that is liable to sink to the bottom in any water, any part of which is navigable or that flows into any navigable water, where there are not at least twenty fathoms of water at all times, but nothing in this section shall be construed so as to permit the throwing or depositing of any substance in any part of a navigable water where that throwing or depositing is prohibited by or under any other Act.

As I mentioned earlier in these reasons, the Act has a more expansive environmental dimension, given the common law context in which it was enacted. The common law proscribed obstructions that interfered with the paramount right of public navigation. Several of the "works" referred to in the Act do not in any way improve navigation. Bridges do not assist navigation, nor do many dams. Thus, in deciding whether a work of that nature is to be permitted, the Minister would almost surely have to weigh the advantages and disadvantages resulting from the interference with navigation. This could involve environmental concerns such as the destruction to fisheries, and all the Guidelines Order does then is to extend the ambit of his concerns.

=== Definition of Navigable Waters ===
Until recently, the Act was relatively silent about what constituted navigable waters, saying only that they included "a canal and any other body of water created or altered as a result of the construction of any work." The Supreme Court of Canada, however, adopted the "floating canoe" threshold in 1906, holding that any water that was navigable and floatable was within its scope.

"The definition of ‘navigable water’ is broad and inclusive, and must be interpreted by relying upon a definition provided in the NWPA and related jurisprudence. Briefly, if a craft is able to pass over a body of water, the body of water would be considered navigable. The craft could be as large as a steamship or as small as a canoe or a raft."

In 2011, the Ontario Superior Court of Justice concluded that the common law of navigability “requires that the waterway be navigable” and “must be capable in its natural state of being traversed by large or small craft of some sort.” It summarized the Canadian jurisprudence on this matter as follows:

1. A stream, to be navigable in law, must be navigable in fact. That is, it must be capable in its natural state of being traversed by large or small craft of some sort—as large as steam vessels and as small as canoes, skiffs and rafts drawing less than one foot of water.
2. "Navigable" also means "floatable" in the sense that the river or stream is used or is capable of use to float logs, log-rafts and booms.
3. A river or stream may be navigable over part of its course and not navigable over other parts.
4. To be navigable in law, a river or stream need not in fact be used for navigation so long as realistically it is capable of being so used.
5. According to the Civil Code of Quebec, the river or stream must be capable of navigation in furtherance of trade and commerce. The test according to the law of Quebec is thus navigability for commercial purposes, but that is not applicable in the common law provinces.
6. The underlying concept of navigability in law is that the river or stream is a public aqueous highway used or capable of use by the public.
7. Navigation need not be continuous but may fluctuate seasonally.
8. Interruptions to navigation such as rapids on an otherwise navigable stream which may, by improvements such as canals be readily circumvented, do not render the river or stream non-navigable in law at those points.
9. A stream not navigable in its natural state may become so as a result of artificial improvements.

Therefore, navigable waters include all bodies of water that are capable of being navigated by any type of floating vessel for transportation, recreation or commerce. In that respect, frequency of navigation may not be a factor in determining a navigable waterway — if it has the potential to be navigated, it will be determined “navigable”.

In 2019, the definition was replaced by the following:

navigable water means a body of water, including a canal or any other body of water created or altered as a result of the construction of any work, that is used or where there is a reasonable likelihood that it will be used by vessels, in full or in part, for any part of the year as a means of transport or travel for commercial or recreational purposes, or as a means of transport or travel for Indigenous peoples of Canada exercising rights recognized and affirmed by section 35 of the Constitution Act, 1982, and

(a) there is public access, by land or by water;
(b) there is no such public access but there are two or more riparian owners; or
(c) Her Majesty in right of Canada or a province is the only riparian owner.

This was held to have ousted the common law definition, according to a judgment of the Superior Court of Ontario in 2020.

=== Attempted amendments ===
A paper commissioned for the Walkerton Inquiry reported:

The federal government, pursuant to its responsibilities for fisheries and navigable waters, had demonstrated concern over water quality intermittently since Confederation. Although generally this interest related to ambient or surface water quality, Canada came close to a national initiative intended to safeguard sources of drinking water as early as 1908. In that year, legislation regarding the pollution of navigable waters was introduced in the Senate by Napoléon Belcourt. The proposal was directed to the newly created Commission of Conservation, which submitted a revised version. Passed by the Senate, the measure was not considered in the Commons because of the unexpected dissolution of Parliament. In 1911, perhaps with renewed determination in light of a major typhoid outbreak in Ottawa, Senator Belcourt reintroduced legislative measures. The Belcourt proposal was essentially a prohibition against contaminating navigable water in Canada, subject to authorized exemptions. This protective measure, intended to safeguard the quality of surface water generally, was wider in scope than most provincial efforts to safeguard sources of water supply:

Every person is guilty of an offence against this Act, and liable on summary conviction to the penalties hereinafter provided, who puts, or causes or permits to be put, or to fall, flow, or to be carried into any navigable water, or into any other water any part of which is navigable or flows into any navigable waters –

(a) Any solid or liquid sewage matter; or
(b) Any other solid matter which, not being sewage is poisonous, noxious, putrid, decomposing, refuse or waste; or
(c) Any liquid matter which, not being sewage, is poisonous, noxious, putrid, decomposing, refuse or waste; unless such matter, whether solid or liquid, is disposed of in accordance with regulations made or permits granted under the authority of this Act.

This time the bill was referred to the Committee on Public Health and, once again, failed to complete its parliamentary passage.
