= Preamble to the Constitution Act, 1867 =

Provision of the Constitution of Canada

British North America Act, 1867

The Preamble to the Constitution Act, 1867 (French: Préambule de la Loi constitutionnelle de 1867) is a provision of the Constitution of Canada, setting out some of the general goals and principles of the Act. Although the Preamble is not a substantive provision, the courts have used it as a guide to the interpretation of the Constitution of Canada, particularly unwritten constitutional principles which inform the history and meaning of the Constitution.

The Constitution Act, 1867 is the constitutional statute which established Canada. Originally named the British North America Act, 1867, the Act continues to be the foundational statute for the Constitution of Canada, although it has been amended many times since 1867. It is now recognised as part of the supreme law of Canada.

== Constitution Act, 1867 ==
The Constitution Act, 1867 is part of the Constitution of Canada and thus part of the "supreme law of Canada". The Act sets out the constitutional framework of Canada, including the structure of the federal government and the powers of the federal government and the provinces. It was the product of extensive negotiations between the provinces of British North America at the Charlottetown Conference in 1864, the Quebec Conference in 1864, and the London Conference in 1866. Those conferences were followed by consultations with the British government in 1867. The Act was then enacted by the British Parliament under the name the British North America Act, 1867. In 1982 the Act was brought under full Canadian control through the Patriation of the Constitution, and was renamed the Constitution Act, 1867. Since Patriation, the Act can only be amended in Canada, under the amending formula set out in the Constitution Act, 1982.

== Text of the Preamble ==
The Preamble reads:

Whereas the Provinces of Canada, Nova Scotia, and New Brunswick have expressed their Desire to be federally united into One Dominion under the Crown of the United Kingdom of Great Britain and Ireland, with a Constitution similar in Principle to that of the United Kingdom:

And whereas such a Union would conduce to the Welfare of the Provinces and promote the Interests of the British Empire:

And whereas on the Establishment of the Union by Authority of Parliament it is expedient, not only that the Constitution of the Legislative Authority in the Dominion be provided for, but also that the Nature of the Executive Government therein be declared:

And whereas it is expedient that Provision be made for the eventual Admission into the Union of other Parts of British North America:

== Legislative history ==
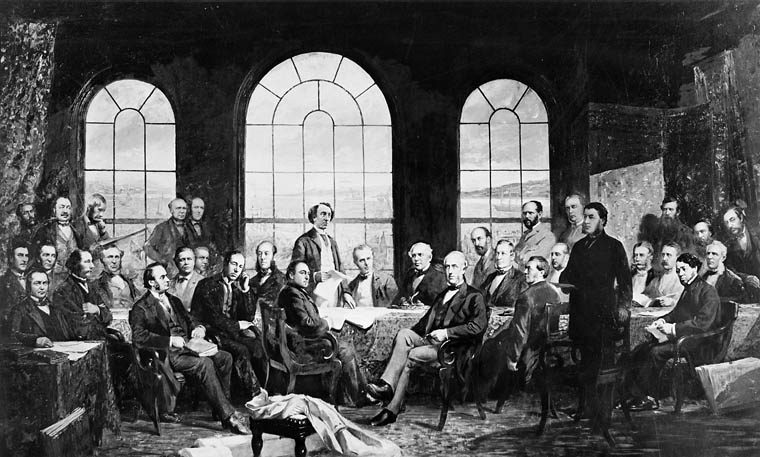
The Quebec Conference, 1864

The origins of the Preamble are in the Quebec Resolutions adopted by the Fathers of Confederation at the Quebec Conference in 1864:

- Resolution 1 stated that "The best interests and present and future prosperity of British North America" would be promoted by a federal union under the British Crown, on terms that were just for all the provinces.
- Resolution 2 summarised the proposed federation, with a general government "charged with matters of common interest to the whole country", and local governments "charged with the control of local matters in their respective sections", and with provision for the future entry of the other British North American provinces and territory.
- Resolution 3 affirmed that the Conference desired "to follow the model of the British Constitution, so far as our circumstances will permit."

These three resolutions were continued at the London Conference of 1866, which finalised the agreement for Confederation. They became the basis for the Preamble, which took its current form in the final draft of the bill, dated February 9, 1867.

The Preamble has not been amended since it was enacted in 1867.

== Purpose and interpretation ==
The Preamble has had a significant impact on constitutional jurisprudence concerning parliamentary democracy, the nature of Canadian federalism, the rule of law and the independence of the Canadian courts.

=== Parliamentary government ===
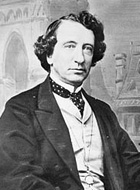
John A. Macdonald, joint premier of the Province of Canada and Father of Confederation

The Preamble's statement that Canada is to have a government "similar in principle to that of the United Kingdom" is an indication that the principles of British parliamentary government, particularly the concept of responsible government, will apply in Canada. John A. Macdonald made this point in the Confederation Debates in the Province of Canada in 1865:

In the Constitution we propose to continue the system of responsible government which has existed in this province since 1841, and which has long obtained in the Mother Country. This is a feature of our Constitution as we have it now, and as we shall have it in the Federation ... With us the Sovereign, or in this country the Representative of the Sovereign, can act only on the advice of his ministers, those ministers being responsible to the people through Parliament.

This approach is carried out by the fact that the monarch is the head of the federal executive, aided by the Privy Council for Canada. The federal Parliament is composed of the monarch, the Senate and the Canadian House of Commons, similar to the British Parliament. Parliament operates under the principles of responsible government, which had been implemented in British North America in the 1840s, beginning in Nova Scotia.

=== "Implied Bill of Rights" ===
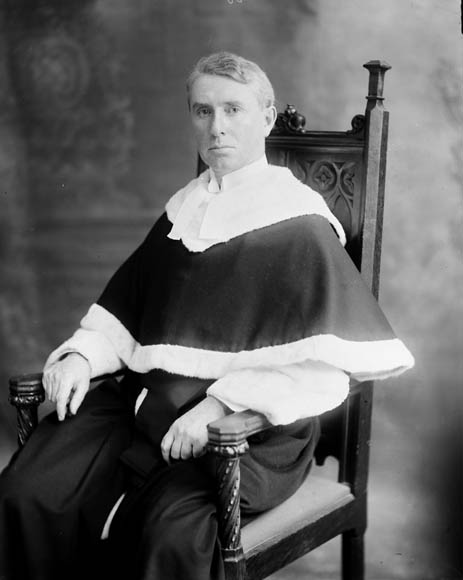
Chief Justice Duff, who held that the Preamble protected political expression

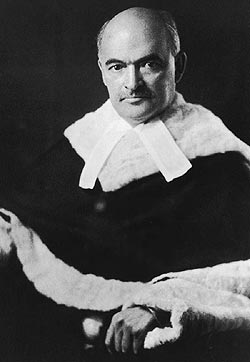
Justice Cannon, who held that freedom of the press was protected by the Preamble

One of the first cases where the Preamble was cited in detail was in Reference Re Alberta Statutes. In that case, Alberta had in 1937 passed several statutes to implement social credit monetary theories, which had then been disallowed by the Lieutenant Governor of Alberta. The Alberta Legislative Assembly then passed three additional statutes, which the federal government referred to the Supreme Court of Canada for an opinion as to their constitutional validity. One statute dealt with bank taxation, the second with the implementation of social credit monetary theories, and the third applied to the news media, entitled An Act to ensure the Publication of Accurate News and Information. The third act required media outlets to publish information furnished to them by the chairman of the government's social credit board, and to provide information as to their sources of news stories back to the chairman.

The Supreme Court unanimously held that the bank taxation act and the social credit act were not within provincial jurisdiction. With respect to the Accurate News Act, the six judges all held that it was ultra vires, but differed on their reasons. Three judges (Justices Kerwin, Crocket and Hudson) held that it was inherently linked to the social credit act, and therefore fell with that act. The other three judges (Chief Justice Duff and Justices Davis and Cannon) went further. They held that the Preamble's reference to a constitution "similar in principle to the United Kingdom" was a guarantee of the vibrant, free debate necessary for a parliamentary democracy to exist and function. The attempt by the Alberta government to limit free media infringed that principle and was ultra vires on that basis. This approach has come to be known as the "implied bill of rights" theory of the Preamble.

On appeal, the Judicial Committee of the Privy Council agreed with the Supreme Court's rulings, but did not find it necessary to address the issue of an implied bill of rights under the Preamble.

=== Canadian federalism ===
==== Inter-delegation Reference ====
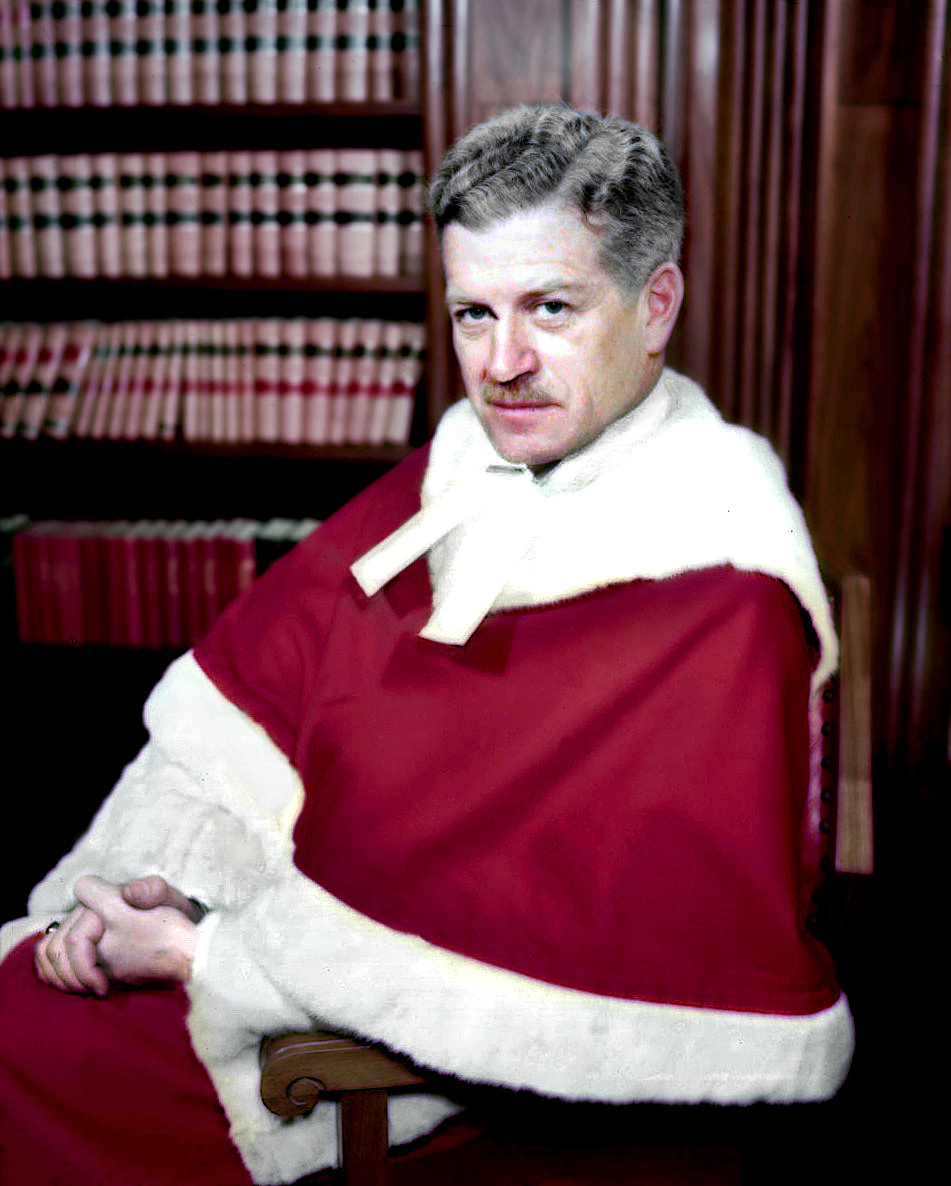
Justice Fauteux, who relied on the Preamble in his federalism analysis

The Preamble was discussed in a later Supreme Court case, the Inter-delegation Reference in 1950. The issue there was a proposal that the federal and provincial governments could delegate their legislative authority to each other. The Supreme Court unanimously held that they could not do so, because the nature of the federation was that the Constitution assigns particular subjects to each government. The governments could not change that allocation of subjects by means of delegation. One of the judges, Justice Fauteux, cited the Preamble, as well as the Quebec Resolutions, in support of this conclusion:

The suggestion that this distribution of legislative authority, enacted by the Imperial Parliament, under the then "existing circumstances", could now be altered by Parliament or the Legislature of a province by transfer, exchange, or delegation, is repugnant to the very intent manifested in the above Resolutions ultimately implemented under the Act.

==== Patriation Reference ====
The Preamble was also cited in the Patriation Reference of 1981, which considered whether the federal government's proposal to seek unilateral constitutional amendments from the British Parliament was constitutional. A majority of the Court held that as a matter of constitutional law, the federal government could proceed unilaterally. The Preamble's reference to federalism did not impose a legal restriction on the federal government. However, a differently-constituted majority in the same case held that as a matter of constitutional convention, the federal government could not proceed unilaterally. There had to be substantial provincial agreement. The majority on convention cited the Preamble's reference to the federal principle in support of the constitutional convention.

=== Rule of law ===
In Re Manitoba Language Rights (1984-85), the Supreme Court unanimously relied on the Preambles to the Constitution Act, 1867 and the Canadian Charter of Rights and Freedoms to provide a constitutional underpinning for the rule of law. The Preamble to the Charter expressly recognises the rule of law. The Court held that the rule of law is also supported by the Preamble to the Constitution Act, 1867, by means of the statement that Canada is to have a constitution "similar in principle" to that of the United Kingdom. The Court concluded that the rule of law is one of the foundational principles of the British constitution, and therefore the Preamble implicitly recognises the rule of law as a key provision of the Constitution of Canada.

=== Parliamentary privilege ===
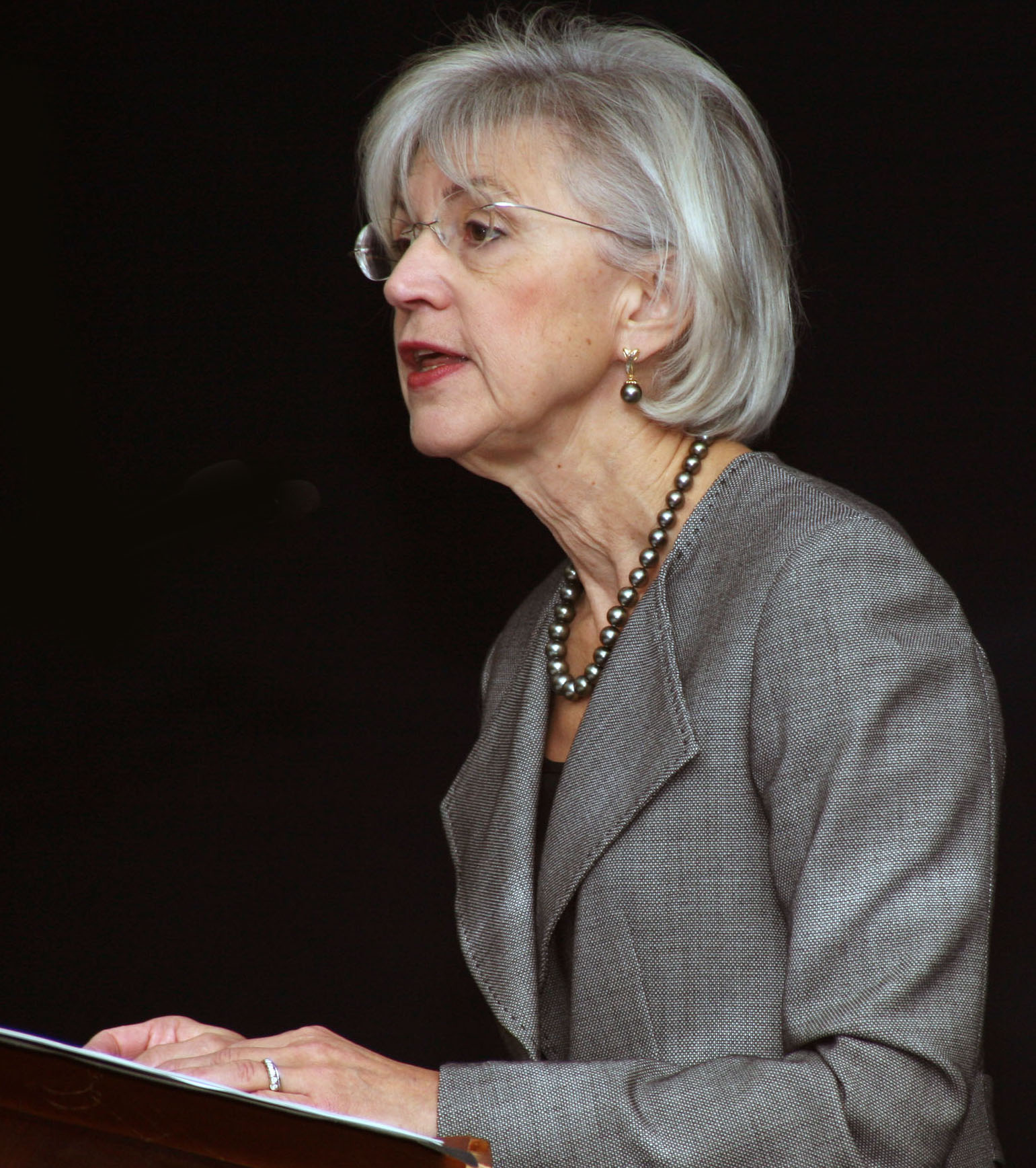
Justice McLachlin, who held that the Preamble gives a constitutional basis for parliamentary privilege

The Preamble also played a part in a major case on the relationship between parliamentary privilege and the Canadian Charter of Rights and Freedoms: New Brunswick Broadcasting Co v Nova Scotia (Speaker of the House of Assembly) (1992-93). Speaking for the majority of the Court, Justice McLachlin held that parliamentary privileges are a necessary component of the parliamentary system Canada inherited from the United Kingdom. Parliamentary privilege is therefore part of the Constitution by means of the Preamble's reference to a "constitution similar in principle to that of the United Kingdom". The majority concluded that the Charter could not be used to override decisions taken by the Speaker of the House of Assembly, in the exercise of the Assembly's power to control access to its own proceedings.

=== Role of the Preamble ===
==== Reference re Remuneration of Judges of the Provincial Court ====
In 1997, the Supreme Court of Canada gave a decision explaining and consolidating its case-law on the Preamble, in Reference re Remuneration of Judges of the Provincial Court. The main issue before the Court was the financial security of the judiciary, which the Court held was a necessary component of judicial independence, protected by the Preamble. Speaking for a majority of eight judges of the court, Chief Justice Lamer summarised the Court’s jurisprudence on the Preamble:

- preambles can be used to identify the purpose of a statute, and also as an aid to construing ambiguous statutory language;
- the preamble to the Constitution Act, 1867, is not only a key to construing the express provisions of the Act, but also invites the use of those organizing principles to fill out gaps in the express terms of the constitutional scheme;
- the Preamble's reference to the desire of the founding provinces "to be federally united into One Dominion" addresses the structure of the division of powers, while its reference to a "constitution similar in principle to that of the United Kingdom", indicates that the legal and institutional structure of constitutional democracy in Canada should be similar to that of the British legal regime out of which the Canadian constitution emerged;
- democratic governance and freedom of political speech are interdependent, and only Parliament can legislate limitations on political expression;
- the Preamble provides constitutional protection for parliamentary privileges for Parliament and the provincial legislatures, to ensure that they can perform their functions free from interference by the Crown and the courts;
- the judicial independence of the courts is guaranteed;
- the Preamble points to the legal order that envelops and sustains Canadian society, which as stated in Re Manitoba Language Rights is "an actual order of positive laws", guaranteed by the rule of law;
- paramountcy of federal laws is an example where the Supreme Court has inferred a basic rule of Canadian constitutional law despite the silence of the constitutional text;
- the doctrine of full faith and credit, which requires the courts of one province to recognize the decisions of the courts of another province, is another example where the Court has inferred a constitutional rule which is not found in express terms in the constitution.

==== Reference re Secession of Quebec ====
In Reference re Secession of Quebec (1998), the Court again commented on the nature of the Preamble. The unanimous judgment of the Court stated:

Allowing for the obvious differences between the governance of Canada and the United Kingdom, it was nevertheless thought important to thus emphasize the continuity of constitutional principles, including democratic institutions and the rule of law; and the continuity of the exercise of sovereign power transferred from Westminster to the federal and provincial capitals of Canada.

The Court confirmed that the Preamble can be used as the basis for "filling of gaps in the express terms of the constitutional text".

== Related provisions of the Constitution Act, 1867 ==
- Section 2 (repealed in 1893) provided that the references to the Queen (i.e. Queen Victoria) included her successors.
- Section 9 states that the executive authority is vested in the Queen.
- Section 11 creates the Privy Council for Canada, which is the constitutional basis of the federal Cabinet.
- Section 17 provides that the Parliament of Canada shall consist of the monarch, the Senate, and the House of Commons.
- Section 18 defines the parliamentary privileges of the Senate and the House of Commons.
- Section 99 provides security of tenure for federally appointed superior court judges.
