= Section 18 of the Constitution Act, 1867 =

Provision of the Constitution of Canada

British North America Act, 1867

Section 18 of the Constitution Act, 1867 (French: article 18 de la Loi constitutionnelle de 1867) is a provision of the Constitution of Canada relating to parliamentary privilege.

The Constitution Act, 1867 is the constitutional statute which established Canada. Originally named the British North America Act, 1867, the Act continues to be the foundational statute for the Constitution of Canada, although it has been amended many times since 1867. It is now recognised as part of the supreme law of Canada.

== Constitution Act, 1867 ==
The Constitution Act, 1867 is part of the Constitution of Canada and thus part of the supreme law of Canada. The Act sets out the constitutional framework of Canada, including the structure of the federal government and the powers of the federal government and the provinces. It was the product of extensive negotiations between the provinces of British North America at the Charlottetown Conference in 1864, the Quebec Conference in 1864, and the London Conference in 1866. Those conferences were followed by consultations with the British government in 1867. The Act was then enacted in 1867 by the British Parliament under the name the British North America Act, 1867. In 1982 the Act was brought under full Canadian control through the Patriation of the Constitution, and was renamed the Constitution Act, 1867. Since Patriation, the Act can only be amended in Canada, under the amending formula set out in the Constitution Act, 1982.

== Text of section 18 ==
Section 18 reads:

Privileges, etc., of Houses
18 The privileges, immunities, and powers to be held, enjoyed, and exercised by the Senate and by the House of Commons, and by the members thereof respectively, shall be such as are from time to time defined by Act of the Parliament of Canada, but so that any Act of the Parliament of Canada defining such privileges, immunities, and powers shall not confer any privileges, immunities, or powers exceeding those at the passing of such Act held, enjoyed, and exercised by the Commons House of Parliament of the United Kingdom of Great Britain and Ireland, and by the members thereof.

Section 18 is found in Part IV of the Constitution Act, 1867, dealing with the legislative powers of the federal Parliament. This version of section 18 was enacted in 1875, as an amendment to the original version.

== Legislative history ==
=== Original version: 1867 to 1875 ===
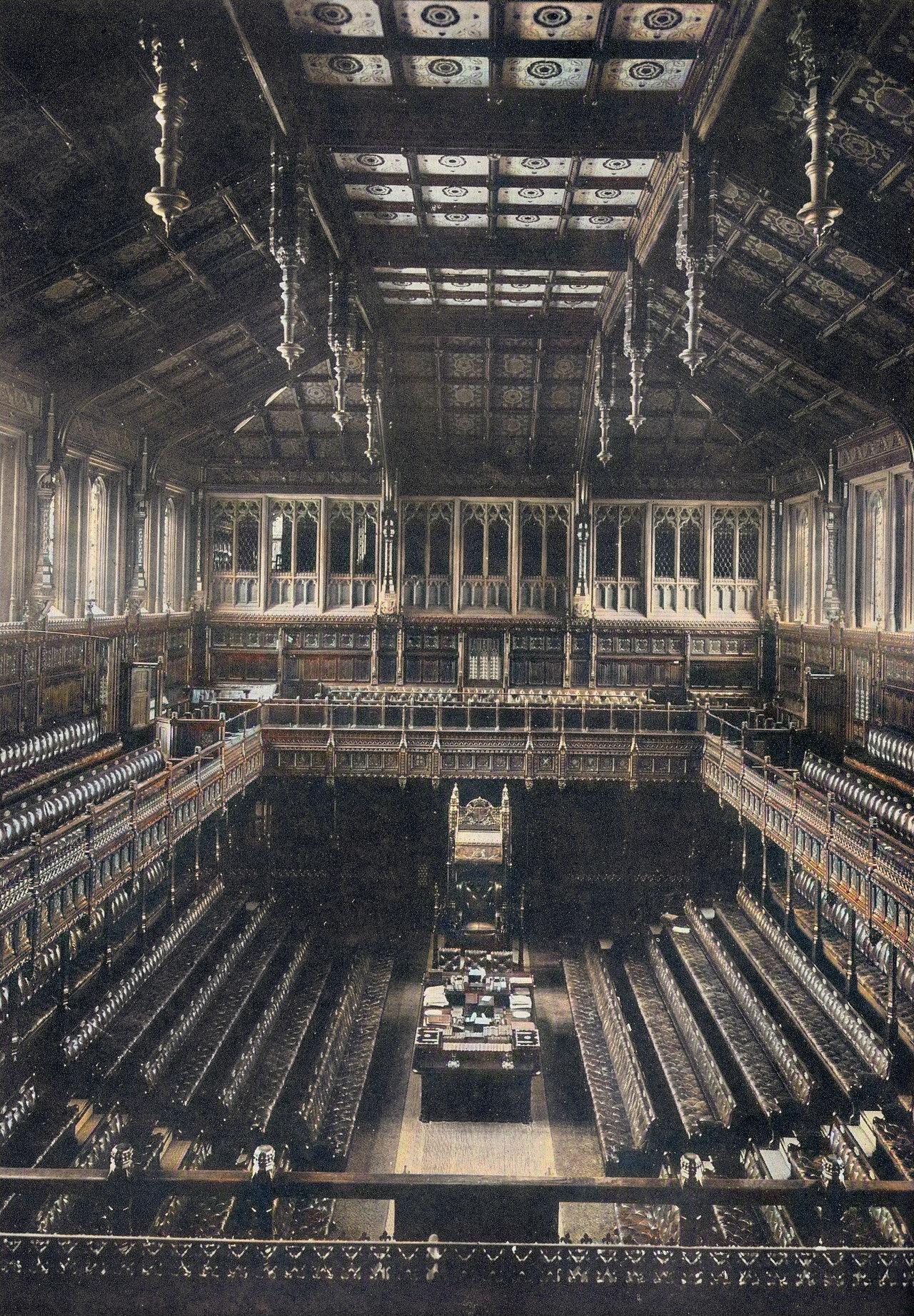
Parliamentary privilege in the federal Parliament was originally based on the privileges of the British House of Commons, as of July 1, 1867.

As originally enacted in 1867, section 18 provided:

18 The Privileges, Immunities, and Powers to be held, enjoyed, and exercised by the Senate and by the House of Commons and by the Members thereof respectively shall be such as are from Time to Time defined by Act of the Parliament of Canada, but so that the same shall never exceed those at the passing of this Act held, enjoyed, and exercised by the Commons House of Parliament of the United Kingdom of Great Britain and Ireland and by the Members thereof.

=== Resolutions and drafts relating to parliamentary privilege ===
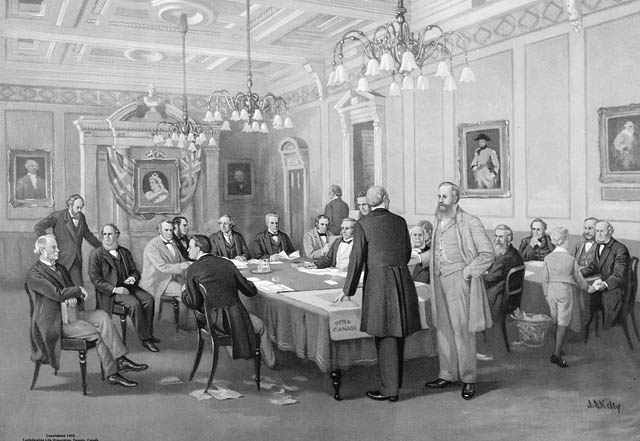
London Conference, 1866, where the issue of parliamentary privilege was first raised

There was no mention of parliamentary privilege in the Quebec Resolutions. The issue first appeared in the London Resolutions, as Resolution 30:

30. The powers and privileges of the House of Commons of the United Kingdom of Great Britain and Ireland shall be held to appertain to the House of Commons of the Confederation, and the powers and privileges appertaining to the House of Lords in its legislative capacity, shall be held to appertain to the Legislative Council [ie the Senate].

The issue of parliamentary privilege was included in the very first draft of the bill, prepared by the delegates to the London Conference. It continued the proposal that the Legislative Council would have the same privileges as the House of Lords, and the Canadian House of Commons would have the same privileges as the British House of Commons.

The issue of privilege was omitted from the next draft, prepared by the British drafters, with a note that privilege "may be provided for by colonial legislation." It reappeared in the third draft, with a proposal that both houses would have the same privileges as the British House of Commons.

The fourth draft also provided that both Canadian houses would have the same privileges and powers as the British House of Commons, with the addition that the Canadian powers and privileges would not "... exceed those now held" by the British House of Commons and its members. With some minor modifications in wording, that became the final form of section 18, as passed by the British Parliament in 1867.

=== Current version, 1875 onwards ===
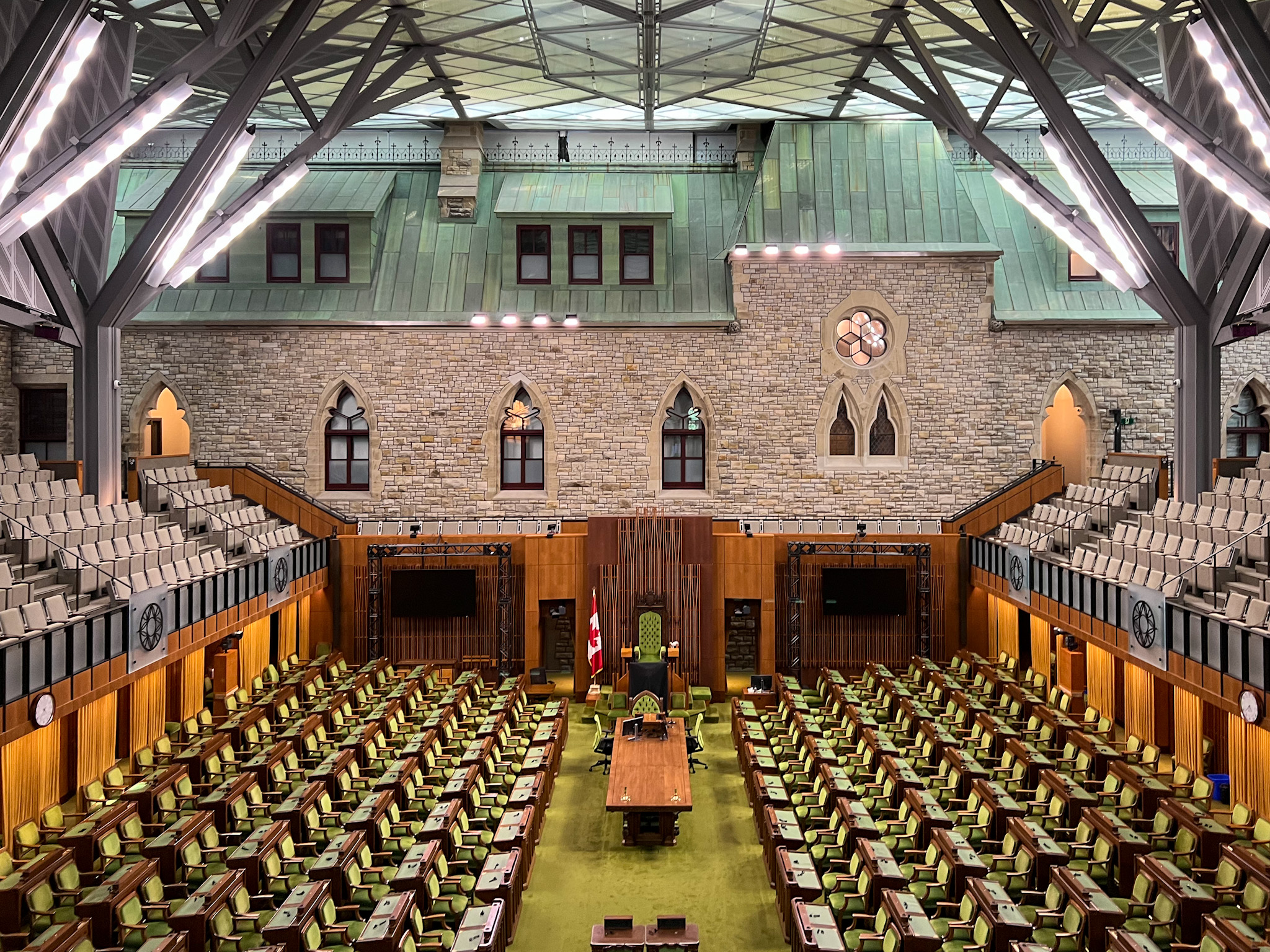
Canadian House of Commons

The original 1867 version was repealed and replaced in 1875 as a result of the Pacific Scandal of 1873, which had resulted in the fall of the Conservative government of Sir John A. Macdonald, and the installation of the Liberal government of Alexander Mackenzie. The events of the Pacific Scandal had shown that the grant of parliamentary privileges in section 18 was limited, and the new Mackenzie government asked the British government to amend section 18 to give broader powers to the Canadian Parliament. In response to that request, the British Parliament enacted the Parliament of Canada Act, 1875, which repealed the original version of section 18 and enacted the current version.

The difference between the two versions was that the original version provided that the federal Parliament could not enact legislation relating to privilege that exceeded the powers of the British House of Commons as of the date of the Constitution Act, 1867 coming into force, namely July 1, 1867. The 1875 version provides that the federal Parliament can enact laws relating to parliamentary privilege, provided the laws do not exceed the powers of the British House of Commons, as of the date the federal laws are enacted.

== Purpose and interpretation ==
=== Evolution of section 18 ===
==== Pre-Confederation ====
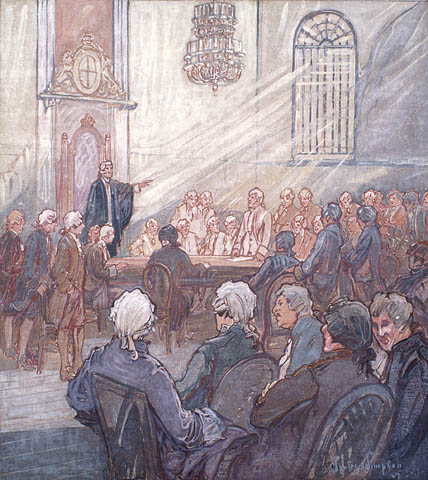
The Legislative Assembly of Lower Canada, in the Chapel of Bishop's Palace, Quebec City

Prior to Confederation, issues arose in the British North American provinces about the parliamentary privileges of the legislative assemblies. In some cases, the assemblies claimed the same privileges as the British Houses of Parliament, while in other cases, they claimed more limited rights, such as only claiming freedom of speech in the assembly.

During this period, the scope of the privileges of the assemblies sometimes arose in judicial proceedings, and sometimes required legal opinions from the British law officers of the Crown. The conclusion drawn was that colonial legislatures did not have the same privileges as the British Parliament, which were based on the historical origins and the lex parlamenti of the British Parliament. Instead, colonial legislative bodies had only those privileges which were necessary for the functioning of a legislature, such as freedom of speech in the assembly. The colonial legislative assemblies did not have the more extensive powers of the British Parliament, such as the power to commit an individual for contempt of Parliament.

An additional limitation was that the Crown, acting through the British government, did not have the power to confer broad privileges on a colonial legislature. Only the British Parliament could give those powers to a colonial legislature, by statute. That was the reason for section 18 of the Constitution Act, 1867, to give the Parliament of Canada the same privileges as that of the British Parliament.

==== Constitutional issue ====
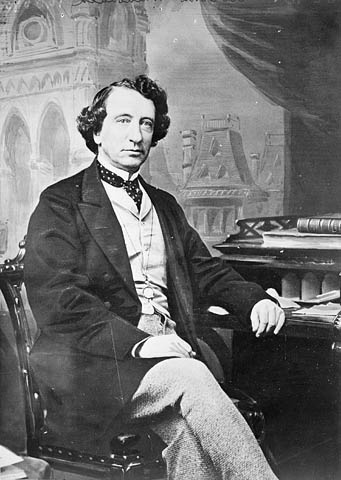
Prime Minister John A. Macdonald asked the Governor General to refer the Oaths Act to the British government.

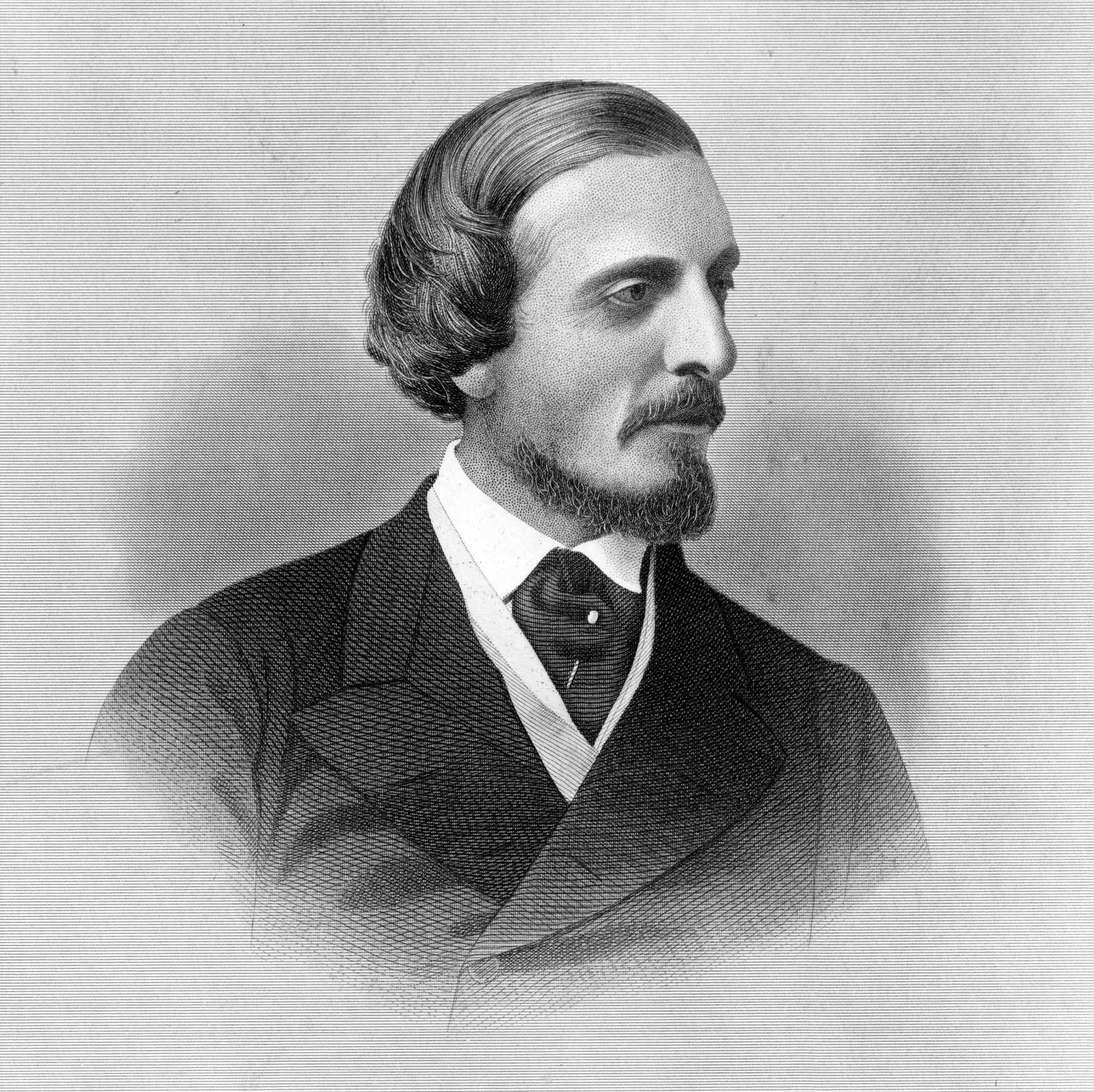
Governor General Lord Dufferin asked the British government for a constitutional opinion on the Oaths Act.

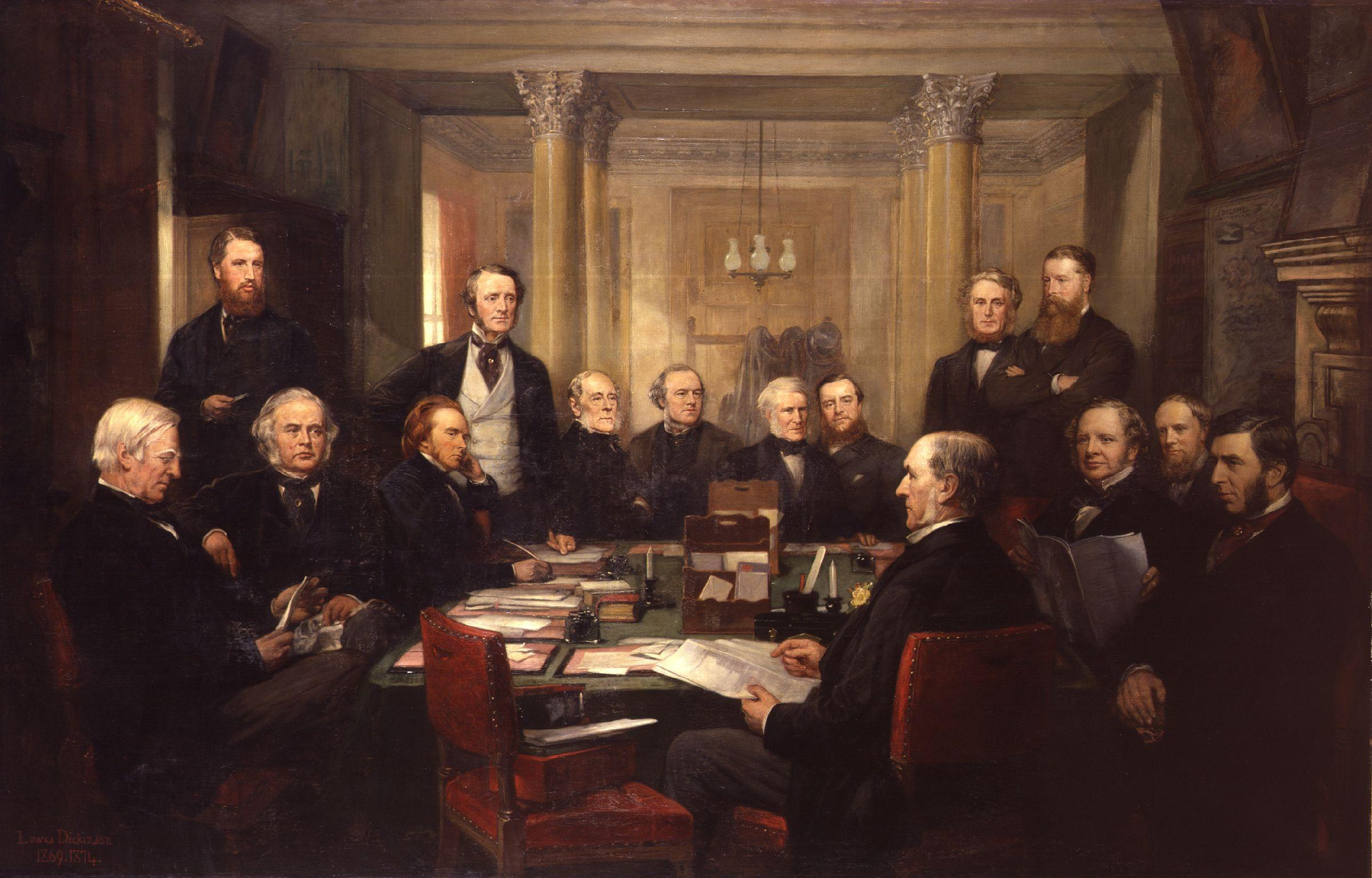
The British Cabinet disallowed the Oaths Act in June 1873.

Six years after Confederation, in 1873, a serious political scandal arose which tested the limits of the privileges of the Parliament of Canada. The Pacific Scandal was triggered by allegations that the Conservative Party, led by Prime Minister John A. Macdonald, had received large donations for the 1872 federal election, from a business group led by Sir Hugh Allan of Montreal. Allan was seeking the federal contract to build the Canadian Pacific Railway, a transcontinental railway to the Pacific coast. When the scandal broke, the opposition Liberals called for a parliamentary inquiry, with the power to compel testimony under oath. The Parliament of Canada passed a statute, the Oaths Act, to give the committee that power.

Questions were raised almost immediately about the constitutional validity of the act. The original version of section 18 limited the parliamentary privileges of the Canadian House of Commons and the Senate to the privileges possessed by the British House of Commons at the time the Constitution Act, 1867 was passed. However, in 1867, the British House of Commons did not have the power to compel testimony under oath; it only obtained that power by a British statute enacted in 1871. The issue was whether the 1873 Oaths Act improperly expanded the parliamentary powers beyond what had been allowed in 1867. Macdonald indicated in the debate on the bill that he shared the concerns whether Parliament had the necessary authority to enact it, but he was prepared to agree to its passage.

Macdonald, in his capacity as Attorney General of Canada, drew the issue to the attention of Governor General Dufferin. Macdonald indicated that he shared the serious concerns being raised about the constitutionality of the act, and asked the Governor General to consider referring the issue to the British government for a legal opinion. Dufferin also had the benefit of an opinion from Alpheus Todd, a leading Canadian expert on British parliamentary practice. Todd disagreed with Macdonald and concluded that the Oaths Act was constitutional. Dufferin referred the matter to the Colonial Secretary, the Earl of Kimberley, including the memos from Macdonald and Todd.

A month later, the response came from the British government: the law officers of the Crown had concluded that the Oaths Act was outside the authority of the Parliament of Canada. The British government therefore advised Queen Victoria to disallow the act, under s 56 of the Constitution Act, 1867. This was the only case of the British government disallowing a federal statute.

==== Constitutional amendment: Parliament of Canada Act, 1875 ====
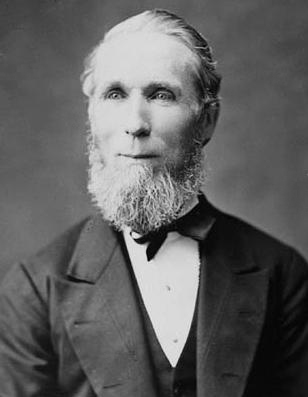
Prime Minister Mackenzie, who requested the amendment to section 18

In late 1873, the Macdonald government resigned over the Pacific Scandal and the Liberals came to office under Alexander Mackenzie. The new government of Alexander Mackenzie responded to the issue of the limited scope of section 18 by asking the British government to amend section 18 to broaden the powers of the Canadian Parliament. The Mackenzie government did not first raise the issue in the Canadian Parliament. Without any debate, the British Parliament enacted the Parliament of Canada Act, 1875. The constitutional amendment had essentially been made by the Canadian cabinet.

When the passage of the amendment became known in Canada, Conservative opposition members of the Canadian House of Commons protested. They argued that any constitutional amendment first had to be approved by the Commons and the Senate, before the request was made to the British government. The Conservatives pointed out that just four years earlier, in 1871, the Liberals (then in opposition) had taken exactly that position with respect to the proposed enactment of the British North America Act, 1871 (now the Constitution Act, 1871). The Conservative government had agreed with the Liberals in 1871, and had introduced the proposed amendment in the Commons and Senate before forwarding it to the British government.

Speaking in the House of Commons, Prime Minister Mackenzie conceded that it would have been better to have first raised the proposed amendment in the Canadian Parliament before making the request to the British government. He agreed that course should be followed for future amendments.

=== Outline of privileges ===
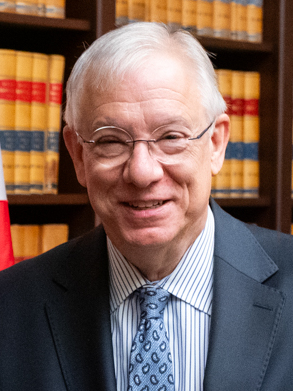
The Speaker of the House of Commons is the guardian of the rights and privileges of the members. Francis Scarpaleggia has been Speaker since 2025.

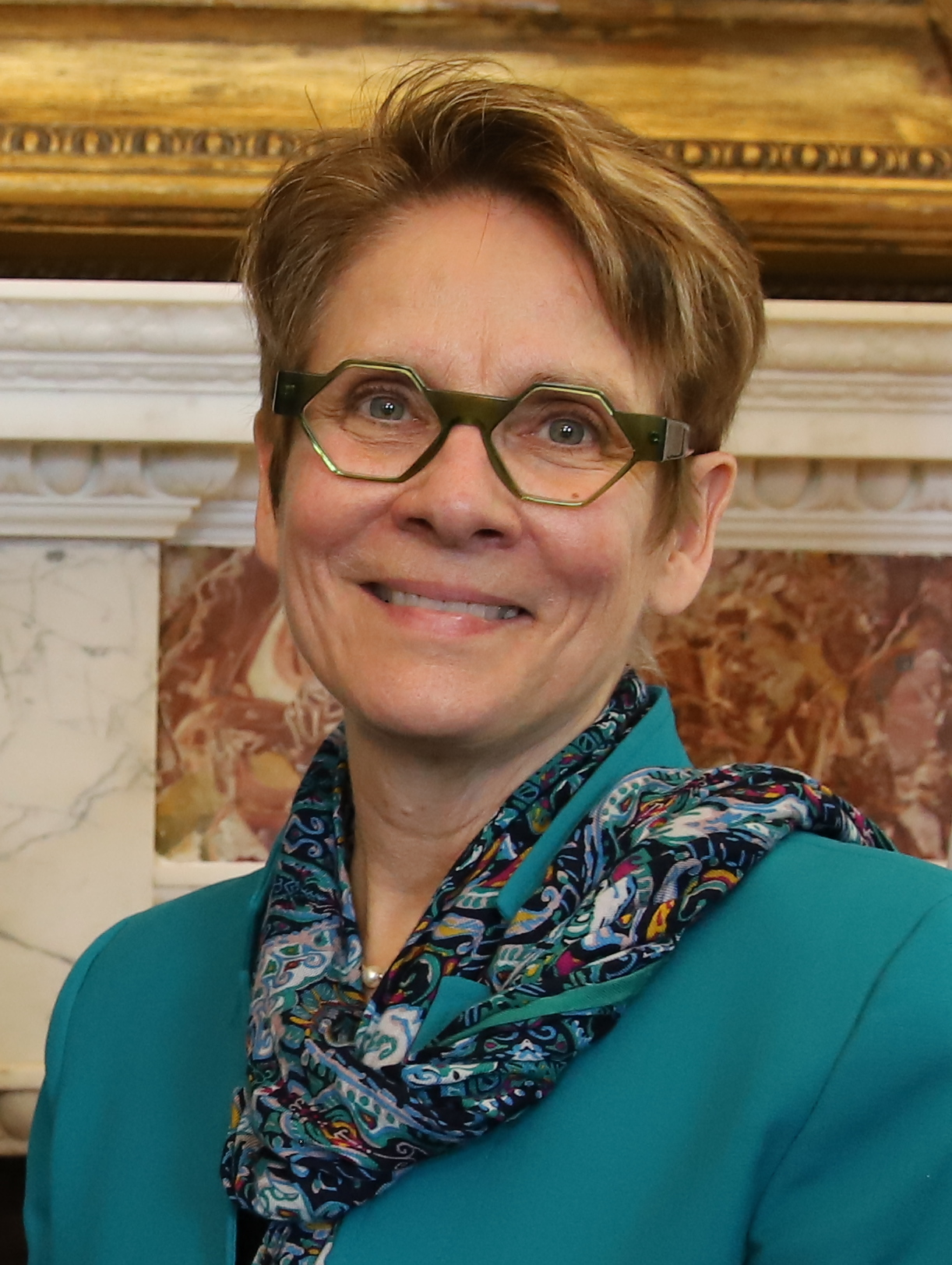
The Speaker of the Senate presides over proceedings in the Senate, rules on points of order and questions of privilege, and preserves order and decorum. Raymonde Gagné has been Speaker since 2024.

Parliamentary privilege covers the individual privileges of members of the House of Commons and the Senate, and the collective privileges of the two houses. Both sets of privileges have their roots in the essential independence for members, needed to carry out their duties. The privileges have evolved over the centuries, with their roots in the English and British House of Commons.

The individual privileges of the members are as follows:

- freedom of speech;
- freedom from arrest in civil actions;
- exemption from jury duty;
- exemption from being subpoenaed to attend court as a witness when Parliament is in session; and
- freedom from obstruction, interference, intimidation and molestation.

Of these, freedom of speech is the most important.

The collective rights of each house are as follows:

- the regulation of its own internal affairs;
- the authority to maintain the attendance and service of its members;
- the power to discipline;
- the right to institute inquiries and to call witnesses and demand papers;
- the right to administer oaths to witnesses appearing before it; and
- the right to publish papers without recourse to the courts relating to the content.

Of these rights and privileges, the right of the house to regulate its own affairs, and the power to discipline, are the most important.

=== Judicial interpretation ===
The Supreme Court of Canada has held that Parliament has the authority to change parliamentary privileges under this section. However, amendments must be consistent with the basic principles of parliamentary government.

== Related provisions of the Constitution Act, 1867 ==
The Preamble to the Constitution Act, 1867 provides that Canada is to have a Constitution "similar in principle to that of the United Kingdom", which has been held to be an additional constitutional basis for parliamentary privilege.
