= Section 2 of the Constitution Act, 1867 =

Provision of the Constitution of Canada

British North America Act, 1867

Section 2 of the Constitution Act, 1867 (French: article 2 de la Loi constitutionnelle de 1867) is a repealed provision of the Constitution of Canada relating to the monarch of Canada. It defined the term "Her Majesty the Queen" for the purposes of the Constitution Act, 1867.

The Constitution Act, 1867 is the constitutional statute which established Canada. Originally named the British North America Act, 1867, the Act continues to be the foundational statute for the Constitution of Canada, although it has been amended many times since 1867. It is now recognised as part of the supreme law of Canada.

== Constitution Act, 1867 ==
The Constitution Act, 1867 is part of the Constitution of Canada and thus part of the supreme law of Canada. The Act sets out the constitutional framework of Canada, including the structure of the federal government and the powers of the federal government and the provinces. It was the product of extensive negotiations between the provinces of British North America at the Charlottetown Conference in 1864, the Quebec Conference in 1864, and the London Conference in 1866. Those conferences were followed by consultations with the British government in 1867. The Act was then enacted in 1867 by the British Parliament under the name the British North America Act, 1867. In 1982 the Act was brought under full Canadian control through the Patriation of the Constitution, and was renamed the Constitution Act, 1867. Since Patriation, the Act can only be amended in Canada, under the amending formula set out in the Constitution Act, 1982.

== Text of section 2 ==
Section 2 has been repealed. As originally enacted in 1867, section 2 read:

Application of Provisions referring to the Queen
2 The Provisions of this Act referring to Her Majesty the Queen extend also to the Heirs and Successors of Her Majesty, Kings and Queens of the United Kingdom of Great Britain and Ireland.

Section 2 was found in Part I of the Constitution Act, 1867, dealing with preliminary matters. It was repealed in 1893 as part of a general statute law revision.

== Legislative history ==
The Quebec Resolutions of 1864 and the London Resolutions of 1866 both stated that the new federation was to be under the Crown of Great Britain, and the executive power was to be vested in the "Sovereign of the United Kingdom of Great Britain and Ireland", but did not provide the specific details set out in section 2. The more specific details about succession set out in section 2 were presumably introduced by the British legislative drafter responsible for the bill, Francis S. Reilly.

Section 2 was repealed by the British Parliament in 1893 in the Statute Law Revision Act, 1893. That act repealed outdated provisions of British statutes which no longer had any effect.

== Purpose and interpretation ==
Section 2 defined the term "Her Majesty the Queen" as used in the Constitution Act, 1867. At the time the act was passed, this section referred to Queen Victoria. The section defined the term to include her successors.

The British Parliament repealed section 2 in 1893. The repeal may have been because the British Parliament had enacted a new Interpretation Act which had a general provision defining the monarch in legislation, and it was felt that there was no need for a specific provision in other legislation. There is no indication that the British government consulted the government of Canada about the repeal.

Although section 2 has been repealed, the courts have held that the references to the British monarch in the Preamble to the Constitution Act, 1867, as well as in section 9 of the Act, relating to the executive powers, establish that the British monarch is also the monarch of Canada.

== Related provisions of the Constitution Act, 1867 ==
The Preamble to the Act states that Canada is to be a federation under the Crown of the United Kingdom of Great Britain and Ireland.

Section 9 of the Act states that the executive authority is vested in the Queen.
