= Section 9 of the Constitution Act, 1867 =

Provision of the Constitution of Canada

British North America Act, 1867

Section 9 of the Constitution Act, 1867 (French: article 9 de la Loi constitutionnelle de 1867) is a provision of the Constitution of Canada which vests the executive power in the monarch.

The Constitution Act, 1867 is the constitutional statute which established Canada. Originally named the British North America Act, 1867, the Act continues to be the foundational statute for the Constitution of Canada, although it has been amended many times since 1867. It is now recognised as part of the supreme law of Canada.

== Constitution Act, 1867 ==
The Constitution Act, 1867 is part of the Constitution of Canada and thus part of the supreme law of Canada. The Act sets out the constitutional framework of Canada, including the structure of the federal government and the powers of the federal government and the provinces. It was the product of extensive negotiations between the British North American provinces at the Charlottetown Conference in 1864, the Quebec Conference in 1864, and the London Conference in 1866. Those conferences were followed by consultations with the British government in 1867. The Act was then enacted in 1867 by the British Parliament under the name the British North America Act, 1867. In 1982 the Act was brought under full Canadian control through the Patriation of the Constitution, and was renamed the Constitution Act, 1867. Since Patriation the Act can only be amended in Canada, under the amending formula set out in the Constitution Act, 1982.

== Text of section 9 ==
Section 9 reads:

Declaration of Executive Power in the Queen
9. The Executive Government and Authority of and over Canada is hereby declared to continue and be vested in the Queen.

Section 9 is found in Part III of the Constitution Act, 1867, dealing with the executive power of the federal government.

== Legislative history ==
The Quebec Resolutions provided that the executive authority would be vested in the "Sovereign of the United Kingdom of Great Britain and Ireland". This statement was repeated in the London Resolutions.

The provision was included in the rough draft of the bill, using the language of the resolutions. It was modified slightly in subsequent drafts, taking final form in the last draft of the bill prior to introduction in the British Parliament.

Section 9 has not been amended since the Act was enacted in 1867.

== Purpose and interpretation ==
=== Confederation Debates ===
John A. Macdonald, co-premier for Canada West (now Ontario) and one of the delegates to the Quebec Conference, explained this provision during the Confederation Debates in the Parliament of the Province of Canada. Commenting on the desirability of maintaining the British connection, he stated:

We accordingly felt that there was a propriety in giving a distinct declaration of opinion on that point, and that in framing the Constitution, its first sentence should declare that, "The executive authority or government shall be vested in the sovereign of the United Kingdom of Great Britain and Ireland, and be administered according to the well understood principles of the British Constitution, by the Sovereign personally, or by the representative of the Sovereign duly authorized." The desire to remain connected with Great Britain and to retain our allegiance to Her Majesty was unanimous. Not a single suggestion was made, that it could, by any possibility, be for the interest of the colonies, or of any section or portion of them, that there should be a severance of our connection.

Other supporters of Confederation also spoke in favour of the monarchical principle, such as Sir Étienne Taché, the co-premier for Canada East (now Quebec): "If we desired to remain British and monarchical, and if we desired to pass to our children these advantages, this measure [Confederation] was a necessity." George-Étienne Cartier, one of the leading Bleus in support of Confederation, said: "In this country of British North America we should have a distinct form of government, the characteristic of which would be to possess the monarchical element."

Support for the monarchical principle was not, however, unanimous in the Confederation Debates. Jean-Baptiste-Éric Dorion, a Rouge member of the Opposition, spoke against it, advocating that the new constitution should be republican in nature, similar to the American constitution:

This scheme of Confederation, this scheme of an independent monarchy, can lead but to extravagance, ruin and anarchy! You may decry as much as you choose the democratic system, and laud the monarchical system — the people will ever estimate them both at their proper value and will ever know that which will suit them best.

=== Constitutional effect ===
By maintaining the monarch as the head of the executive, section 9 continued all of the royal prerogative powers of the monarch with respect to executive powers, as well as aspects of the prerogative relating to the operation of government, such as the power to appoint ministries, summon or dissolve Parliament, and call elections. Those powers are exercised on the advice of the elected government, under the principles of responsible government.

== Related provisions of the Constitution Act, 1867 ==
The Preamble to the Act affirms that Canada is to be federally united "under the Crown of the United Kingdom of Great Britain and Ireland, with a Constitution similar in principle to that of the United Kingdom".

Section 2 of the act (repealed in 1893) provided that the references to the Queen (i.e. Queen Victoria) included her successors.
