= Fathers of Confederation =

List of the founders of Canada

The Fathers of Confederation (French: Pères de la Confédération) are the 36 people who attended at least one of the Charlottetown Conference of 1864 (23 attendees), the Quebec Conference of 1864 (33 attendees), and the London Conference of 1866 (16 attendees), preceding Canadian Confederation. Only twelve people attended all three conferences.

== Table of participation ==
The following table lists the participants in the Charlottetown, Quebec, and London Conferences and their attendance at each stage.

Participant	Portrait	Province (Current)	Charlottetown	Quebec City	London
Sir Adams George Archibald		Nova Scotia	Yes	Yes	Yes
George Brown		Ontario	Yes	Yes	No
Sir Alexander Campbell		Ontario	Yes	Yes	No
Sir Frederick Carter		Newfoundland and Labrador	No	Yes	No
Sir George-Étienne Cartier		Quebec	Yes	Yes	Yes
Edward Barron Chandler		New Brunswick	Yes	Yes	Yes
Jean-Charles Chapais		Quebec	No	Yes	No
James Cockburn		Ontario	No	Yes	No
George Coles		Prince Edward Island	Yes	Yes	No
Robert B. Dickey		Nova Scotia	Yes	Yes	Yes
Charles Fisher		New Brunswick	No	Yes	Yes
Sir Alexander Tilloch Galt		Quebec	Yes	Yes	Yes
John Hamilton Gray		Prince Edward Island	Yes	Yes	No
John Hamilton Gray		New Brunswick	Yes	No	No
Thomas Heath Haviland		Prince Edward Island	No	Yes	No
William Alexander Henry		Nova Scotia	Yes	Yes	Yes
Sir William Pearce Howland		Ontario	No	No	Yes
John Mercer Johnson		New Brunswick	Yes	Yes	Yes
Sir Hector-Louis Langevin		Quebec	Yes	Yes	Yes
Andrew Archibald Macdonald		Prince Edward Island	Yes	Yes	No
Sir John A. Macdonald		Ontario	Yes	Yes	Yes
Jonathan McCully		Nova Scotia	Yes	Yes	Yes
William McDougall		Ontario	Yes	Yes	Yes
Thomas D'Arcy McGee		Quebec	Yes	Yes	No
Peter Mitchell		New Brunswick	No	Yes	Yes
Sir Oliver Mowat		Ontario	No	Yes	No
Edward Palmer		Prince Edward Island	Yes	Yes	No
William Henry Pope		Prince Edward Island	Yes	Yes	No
John William Ritchie		Nova Scotia	No	No	Yes
Sir Ambrose Shea		Newfoundland and Labrador	No	Yes	No
William H. Steeves		New Brunswick	Yes	Yes	No
Sir Étienne-Paschal Taché		Quebec	No	Yes	No
Sir Samuel Leonard Tilley		New Brunswick	Yes	Yes	Yes
Sir Charles Tupper		Nova Scotia	Yes	Yes	Yes
Edward Whelan		Prince Edward Island	No	Yes	No
Robert Duncan Wilmot		New Brunswick	No	No	Yes

== Group photographs and paintings ==
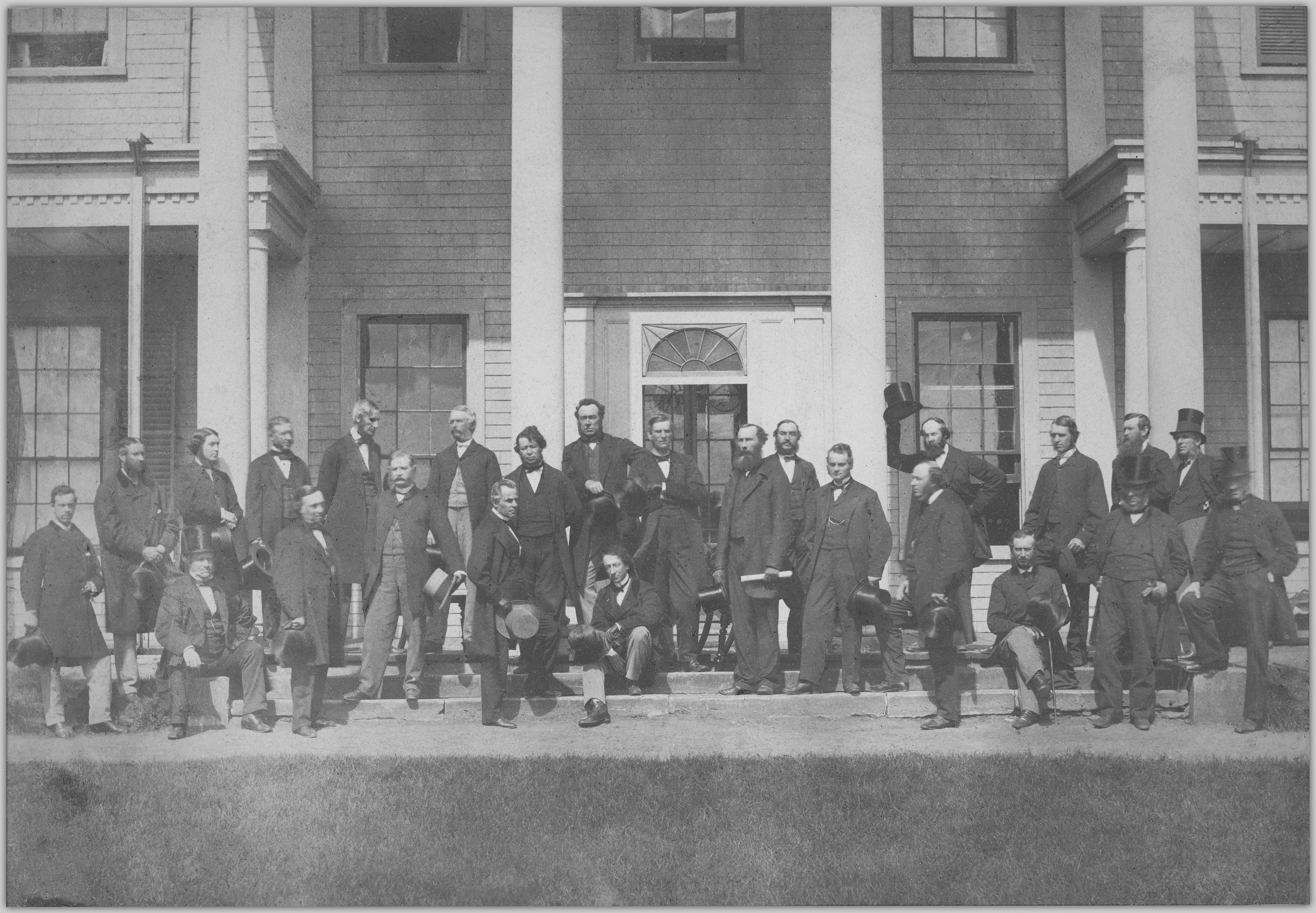
Delegates from the Legislatures of Canada, gathering on the steps of Prince Edward Island's Government House for the Charlottetown Conference – Photo by George P. Roberts on September 11, 1864.

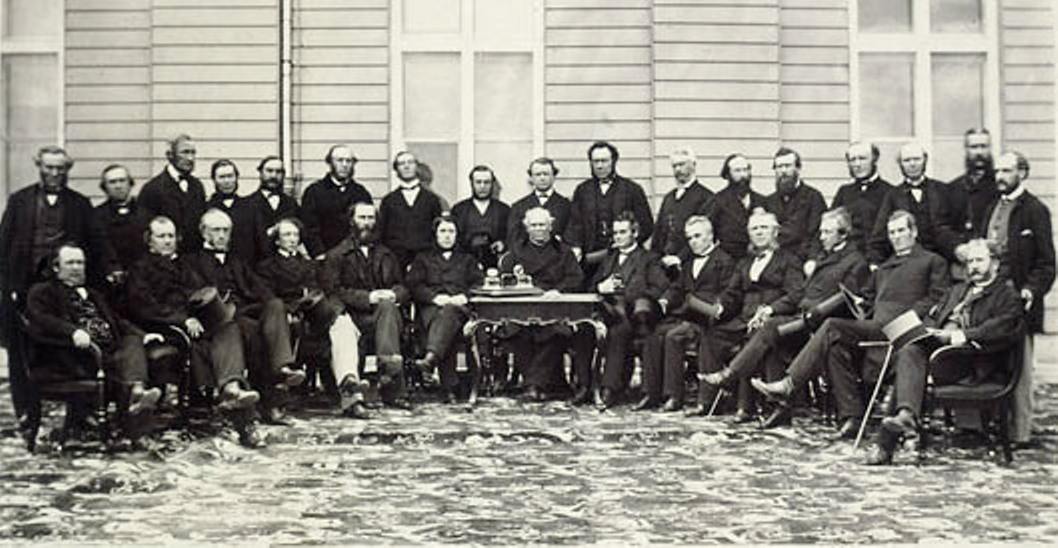
Delegates of the Legislatures of Canada gathering at the Quebec Conference – Photo by Jules I. Livernois on October 27, 1864.

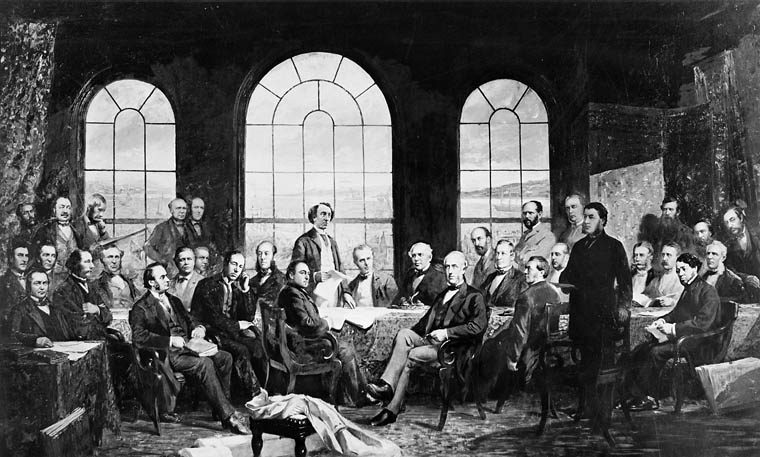
An 1885 photo of Robert Harris' painting, completed the previous year and titled, Conference at Quebec in 1864, to settle the basics of a union of the British North American Provinces, also known as The Fathers of Confederation. The original painting was destroyed in the 1916 Parliament buildings Centre Block fire. The scene is an amalgamation of the Charlottetown and Quebec City conference sites and attendees.

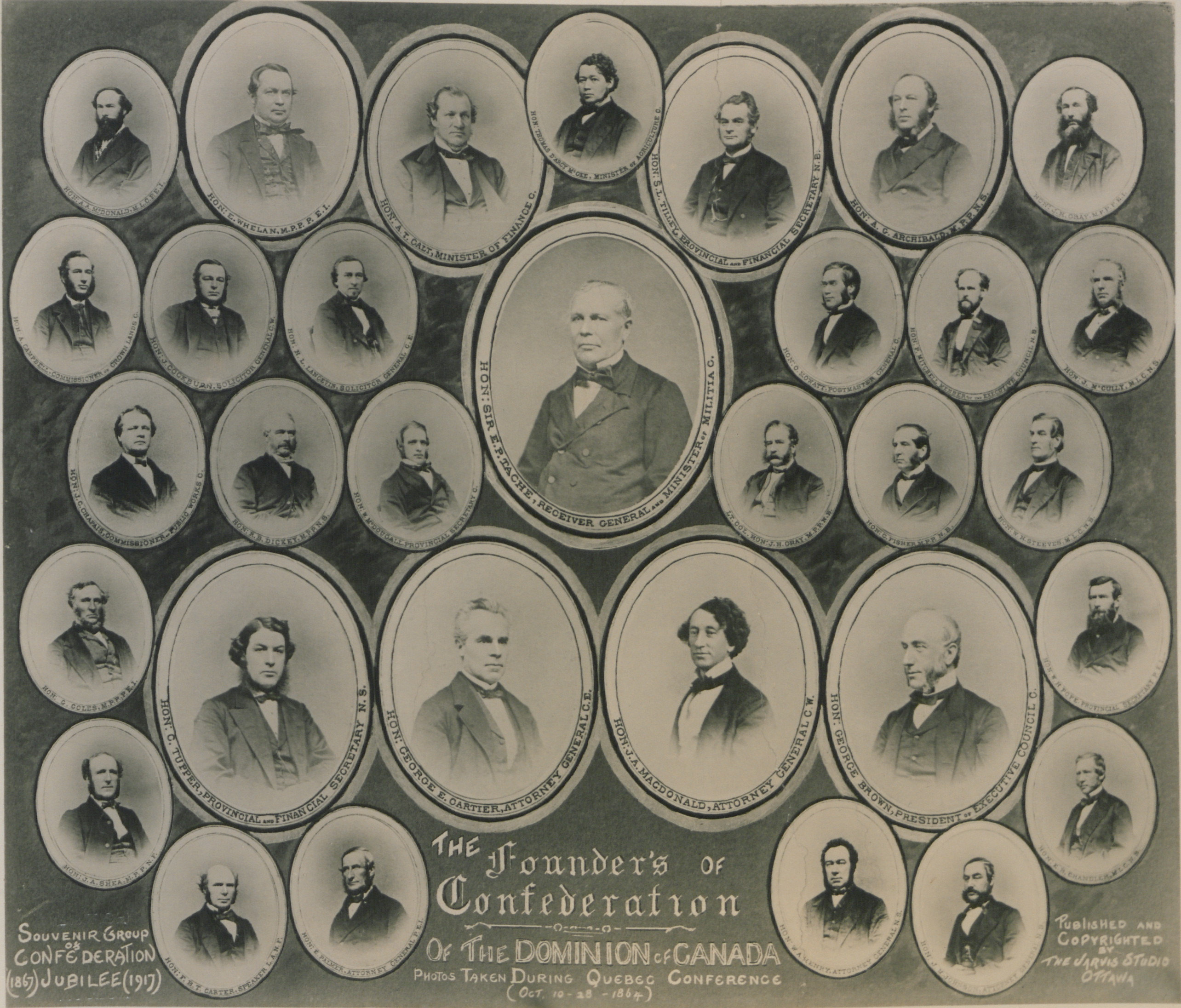
Souvenir Group" photograph published in 1917 commemorating the 1867 Confederation of Canada. It features portraits of the "Fathers of Confederation" who participated in the Quebec Conference held in October 1864.

== Other possible claimants to title ==
Four other individuals have been labelled as Fathers of Confederation. Hewitt Bernard, who was the recording secretary at the Charlottetown Conference, is considered by some to be a Father of Confederation. The leaders most responsible for bringing three specific provinces into Confederation after 1867 are also referred to as Fathers of Confederation.

- The provisional government established by Louis Riel ultimately negotiated the terms under which Manitoba entered Confederation in 1870.
- The leadership of Amor De Cosmos was instrumental both in bringing democracy to British Columbia and in bringing the province into Confederation in 1871.
- The province of Newfoundland entered Confederation in 1949 under the leadership of Joey Smallwood, who was then referred to as the "only living Father of Confederation".

== See also ==
- Anti-Confederation Party
- List of national founders
- Persons of National Historic Significance
