= Section 9 =

Section 9 may refer to:

- Public Security Section 9, fictional agency in Ghost in the Shell
- "Section 9 (Light & Day/Reach for the Sun)", 2002 song by Polyphonic Spree
- Section 9 of the Canadian Charter of Rights and Freedoms
- Section 9 of the Constitution Act, 1867
- Section Nine of the Constitution of South Africa
