= George Brown (Canadian politician) =

Canadian Father of Confederation (1818–1880)

The Honourable George Brown
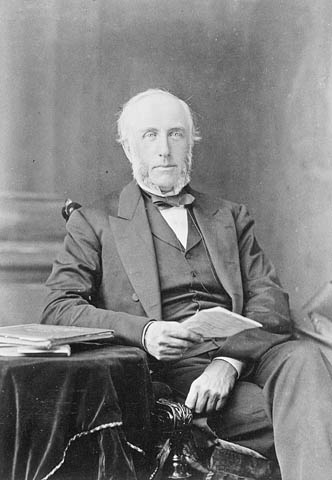

10th Joint premier of the Province of Canada from Canada West
- In office August 2, 1858 – August 6, 1858 Serving with Antoine-Aimé Dorion
- Monarch: Victoria
- Preceded by: John A. Macdonald
- Succeeded by: John A. Macdonald

Leader of the Liberal Party of Canada
- In office 1867–1867
- Preceded by: Office Established
- Succeeded by: Edward Blake

Canadian Senator from Ontario
- In office December 16, 1873 – May 9, 1880
- Appointed by: Alexander Mackenzie

Personal details
- Born: November 29, 1818 Alloa, Clackmannanshire, Scotland
- Died: May 9, 1880 (aged 61) Toronto, Ontario, Canada
- Cause of death: Infection resulting from firearm wound
- Resting place: Toronto Necropolis
- Citizenship: British
- Party: Clear Grit Party
- Profession: Politician; journalist; publisher
- Father of Confederation

George Brown (November 29, 1818 – May 9, 1880) was a Scottish Canadian journalist, politician, the founder of the town of Bothwell, and one of the Fathers of Confederation. He attended the Charlottetown and Quebec conferences. A noted Reform politician, he is best known as the founder and editor of the Toronto Globe, Canada's most influential newspaper at the time, and his leadership in the founding of the Liberal Party in 1867. He was an articulate champion of the grievances and anger of Upper Canada (Ontario). He played a major role in securing national unity. His career in active politics faltered after 1865, but he remained a powerful spokesman for the Liberal Party. He promoted westward expansion and opposed the policies of Conservative prime minister John A. Macdonald.

== Early life ==
=== Scotland ===
George Brown was born in Alloa, Clackmannanshire, Scotland on November 29, 1818. His father, Peter Brown, ran a wholesale business in Edinburgh and managed a glassworks in Alloa. His mother was Marianne (née Mackenzie). George was their eldest son; he had two older sisters, two younger sisters and four younger brothers, although three of the brothers died in infancy. He was baptised in St. Cuthbert's Chapel of Ease. He lived in Alloa until he moved to Edinburgh before he turned eight. He attended Royal High School, then transferred to the Southern Academy of Edinburgh.

Upon graduation his father wanted George to attend university but George convinced his father to let him work in the family's business. He briefly lived in London to be taught by agents of the business before returning to Edinburgh. He joined the Philo-Lectic Society of Edinburgh, where young men would meet and discuss topics in a parliamentary debate. Brown's father was a member of the Edinburgh Emancipation Society: when abolitionist George Thompson visited Edinburgh in 1836, his father organised a party and recruited Brown to help with the occasion.

Brown's father also worked as a collector of assessments. Some of the funds he collected for the municipality were mixed with his business bank accounts, and in 1836 some of the funds in these accounts were lost in business speculations. Peter was not accused of corruption, but he sought to repair his reputation and recoup the lost funds. He attempted to collect from people he lent money to but was unable to after the onset of the economic depression in 1837. Peter decided to emigrate to New York City to seek business opportunities and rebuild his reputation. George accompanied his father to North America, and they left Europe in May 1837.

=== New York City ===
The Browns landed in New York in June 1837. Peter opened a dry goods store on Broadway and George worked as his assistant. The following year, Brown's mother and sisters immigrated to New York and the family lived in a rented home on Varick Street. When the store grew larger, George travelled to New England, upstate New York, and Canada to continue growing their business. In July 1842 Peter published the first edition of a newspaper called the British Chronicle, which advocated a Whig-Liberal political ideology and published articles on British news and politics. As circulation increased in Canada, the paper devoted articles to the political news in the Province of Canada. George became the paper's publisher in March 1843 and travelled to New England, upstate New York, and Canada to promote the paper. While in Canada, Brown spoke with politicians and editors in Toronto, Kingston, and Montreal. Brown might have also been writing articles for the paper; J.M.S. Careless, a historian, notes that a series of articles called "A Tour of Canada" were published in the same writing style of Brown's later articles while Brown was in Canada.

Peter Brown supported the evangelical faction during the Disruption of 1843 within the Church of Scotland. These members separated from the Church of Scotland in May 1843 and formed the Free Church of Scotland. While George was touring Canada, they asked him to present an offer to his father: to move publication of the British Chronicle to Upper Canada in exchange for a bond of $2500. George supported the proposal, as he felt there were more opportunities to succeed in Canada. He thought that there was hostility towards the paper in New York because of the paper's focus on Britain. Upon meeting Reform politicians in his travels through Canada, George felt that they would support his paper should it relocate to the province. George convinced his father to move to Canada and they published the last issue of the British Chronicle on July 22, 1843.

=== Canada ===
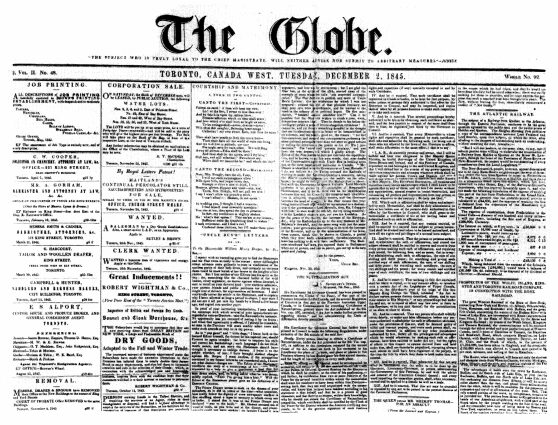
December 2, 1845

George and Peter rented a storefront in Toronto and on August 18, 1843, they published the first edition a new paper called Banner. George managed the secular department of the newspaper, commenting on non-religious issues. Banner initially did not commit to any political causes, although it supported many policies advocated by Reformers. This changed when the governor-general of the province, Charles Metcalfe, prorogued the Reform-dominated Canadian assembly when several Reform politicians resigned from the government. George published an editorial on December 15 that was critical of the governor-general's actions. In the subsequent weeks, Banner published editorials that disputed political accusations against Reformers and called for unity behind Liberal candidates in future elections.

In 1844, Reformers were concerned that Tories, in the upcoming election for the legislature of the Province of Canada, would appeal to the citizen's sense of loyalty to the British monarch and thus not vote for Reformers. They wanted to establish newspapers that would publish their ideas and offered Brown £250 (equivalent to £27,000 in 2025) to begin a new paper. In March, Brown published the first issue of The Globe as its editor and publisher. Two months later, Brown bought a rotary press, the first press of this type used in Upper Canada. This purchase increased his printer's efficiency and allowed Brown to create a book publishing and printing office business. Although George was focused on politics, he still wrote articles for the Banner and travelled in July to Kingston to report on the Canadian Synod for the Church of Scotland. After the meeting, Brown sat on the committee of Free Kirks in Kingston who wanted to secede from the Church of Scotland. In the fall, Brown campaigned for Reform candidates in communities surrounding Toronto. In Halton, Reformers asked Brown to convince one of the three Reform candidates to end their campaign as the county would only elect two candidates and Reformers did not want to split the vote; Brown convinced Caleb Hopkins to end his campaign. Brown declined to run as a candidate because he wanted to help his father pay off his financial debts and focus on improving his newspapers. Reformers were mostly unsuccessful in the election, with many prominent members not returning to the legislature.

In the summer of 1845, Brown put his father in charge of The Globe and travelled to Southwestern Ontario to increase subscriptions to his paper. He discovered that a rival Reform newspaper called Pilot was selling copies at a lower rate and people did not want to subscribe to more than one paper. Brown appealed to Reform leaders, who convinced Francis Hincks, the editor of Pilot, to raise the cost of his paper. In October, Brown published the first edition of Western Globe in London, Canada West, which combined editorials from The Globe with local stories from the southwestern region. In 1846, Brown began publishing the Globe semi-weekly, proclaiming that he was the first Reform-newspaper in Toronto to do so.

During the 1848 Province of Canada legislative election, Hincks was in Montreal attending to business concerns and did not go to Oxford county to campaign for his re-election as the constituency's representative. Brown spoke at the nomination meeting on Hincks's behalf and Hincks was reelected. Reformers won the majority of seats in the election to form an administration led by Baldwin and Louis-Hippolyte Lafontaine. In July 1848 Brown and his father closed the Banner to focus on expanding The Globe and their publishing business.

In the summer of 1848, Brown was appointed by the administration to lead a Royal Commission to examine accusations of official misconduct in the Provincial Penitentiary in Portsmouth, Canada West. The commission's report, drafted by Brown in early 1849, documented abuse within the penitentiary perpetrated by its staff members. He recommended changes in the jail's structure such as separating juvenile, first-time, and long-term prisoners and hiring prison inspectors. While the commission was conducting its investigation, the prison's Board of Inspectors resigned and Brown, along with Adam Fergusson and William Bristow. Although initially volunteers, Brown and Bristow were later paid for their work, becoming the first government inspectors to be employed in this role. In October 1853 The Globe started printing new issues daily and claimed that the paper had the largest circulation in British North America.

== Early political career ==
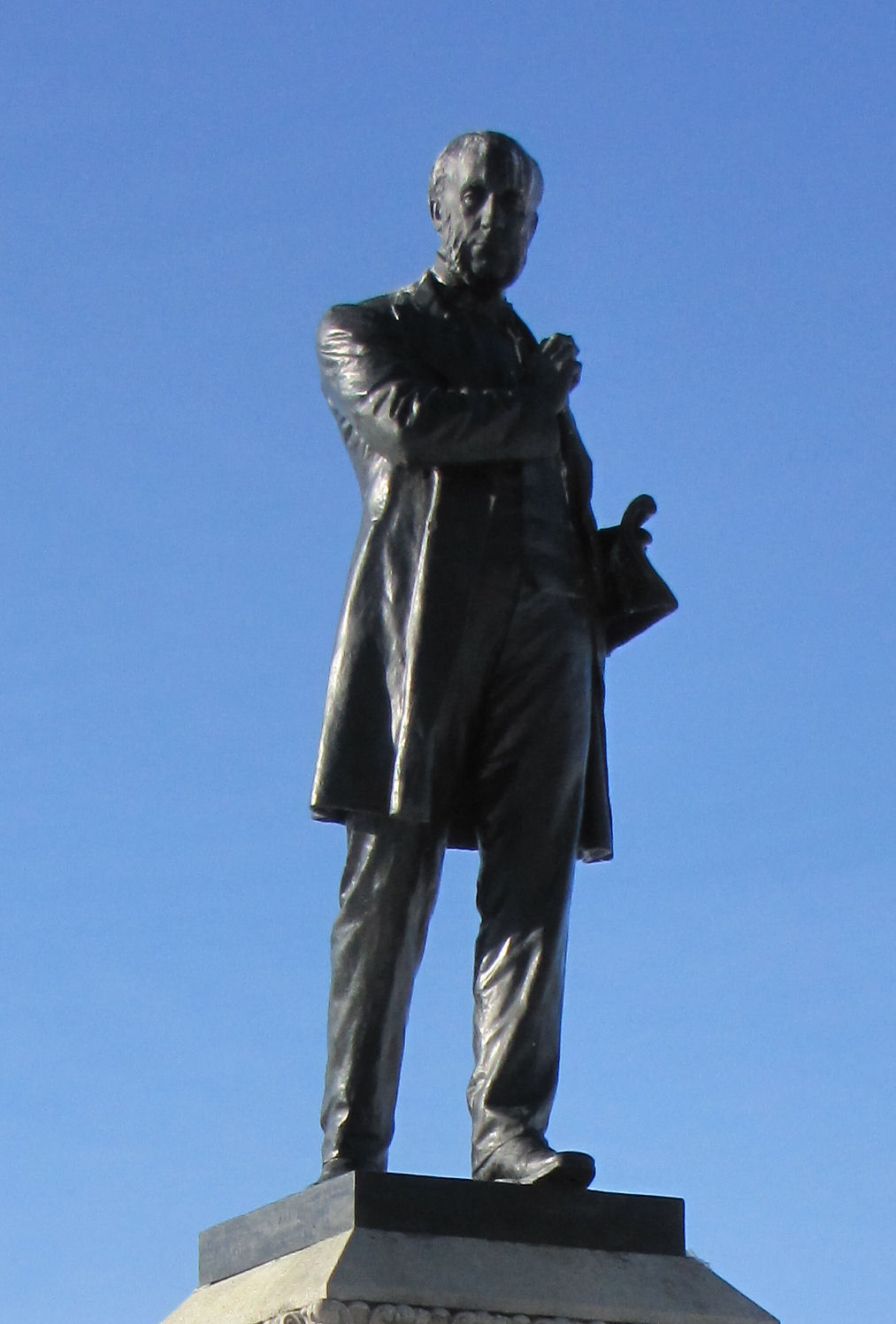
Statue of Brown on Parliament Hill, Ottawa

=== Election win and opposition member ===
In 1848, Reformers won the majority of seats in the Province of Canada legislature and an administration was formed with Robert Baldwin and Louis-Hippolyte Lafontaine serving as co-premiers. By the following year, two factions formed among the Reformers over disagreements among secularising clergy reserves, whether the Province of Canada should be annexed by the United States, and how much influence should be given to Reformers who participated in the Upper Canada Rebellion. Brown remained aligned with the Reform party while others split off to form the Clear Grit movement. He joined the Toronto Anti-Clergy Reserves Association in May 1850 to advocate for the abolition of clergy reserves; he did not think French-Canadian reformers would support these measures, but thought that promoting this policy would prevent further Reform defections to the Clear Grits.

In April 1851, Brown ran in a byelection to represent Haldimand County in the Canadian parliament but lost to William Lyon Mackenzie. In the following session of parliament, Baldwin and Lafontaine announced their retirement from politics, and Hincks assumed leadership of the western Reform movement. Hincks renewed his rivalry with Brown, criticising the Globe for opposing state support for religious institutions. In the fall of 1851, Brown bought agricultural land in Kent county, Upper Canada, to begin work as a farmer. Later that year, Reformers in Kent county, including Alexander Mackenzie and Archibald McKellar, encouraged Brown to run in the upcoming Canadian parliament election for the constituency of Kent county. Brown accepted their offer and was nominated as a Reform candidate, even though he planned to campaign against the current Reform ministry's state support for religious institutions. He also campaigned in support of representation by population, free trade agreements with British colonies and the United States, and the development of transportation infrastructures like rail lines and canals. Brown won the election as an independent Reform candidate, defeating Arthur Rankin, the Reformer's ministry-approved candidate, and a Tory opponent.

Brown supported an administration led by Hincks and Augustin-Norbert Morin as successors to the Baldin-Lafontaine government, though he criticised the government for abandoning liberal ideals. Brown worked to end state support for religious institutions, opposed government funding for a religious separate school system and endorsed representation by population in the legislature. His newspaper, the Globe, still had widespread circulation and on October 1 started publishing every day as the Daily Globe to compete with other newspapers who had previously started to publish daily. Brown's support deteriorated when scandals against Hincks were reported in the fall of 1853 and Brown toured Canada West, demanding new leadership for the Reform party. For the 1854 general election, the constituency he represented was split into two and he decided to run in Lambton, as he was not confident that he could win the other Kent constitutency. At the election's conclusion, Hincks formed a new Liberal-Conservative administration with Allan MacNab, causing Brown to become a member of the opposition.

Brown worked with his opposition colleagues, including former Clear Grit rivals, Reformers who abandoned Hincks, and the Parti Rouge, to criticise the governing coalition. For these efforts, Brown assumed an unofficial role as one of the leaders of the opposition members. He also bought two Grit-aligned newspapers and merged their staffs to his Globe paper. In May 1855, the Canadian legislature passed a bill that allowed the creation of Roman Catholic-based separate school boards in Upper Canada. This was seen as French-Canadian encroachment into Upper Canadian matters, as the bill passed without the support of the majority of Upper Canadian parliamentarians. Brown used the event to campaign for representation by population, in which electoral districts would be divided so that each one contained a roughly equal number of electors. Brown's pursuit of that goal of correcting what he perceived to be a great wrong to Canada West was accompanied at times by stridently critical remarks against French Canadians and the power exerted by the Catholic population of Canada East over the affairs of a predominately anglophone and Protestant Canada West. However, he did not want the dissolution of the Canadas as much of Canada West's trade went through Canada East along the St. Lawrence River, and splitting the union would give the eastern province control over the waterway before they entered Canada West.

In 1852, Brown founded, organised, and provided the credit for the development of the town of Bothwell, in his constituency of Lambton, and set aside farmland for his own use. In 1856, John A. Macdonald accused Brown of falsifying evidence and coercing witnesses in the Royal Commission on the Kingston Provincial Penitentiary in 1848. A committee of inquiry produced a report that was non-committal of Brown's guilt. Macdonald's accusations and subsequent investigation caused a political rivalry to deepen between Brown and Macdonald.

=== 1857 election and subsequent legislature ===
Brown helped organize a political convention on January 8, 1857, to unite his followers with Clear Grits and Liberals who left the Hincks administration. Brown served as one of the meeting's "joint secretaries of the local committee". This convention marked the Reform party's transition away from a radicalism and towards a political ideology more closely aligned with the liberal ideology in Britain. The meeting adopted a new political platform for Reformer that was mostly of the political positions of Brown and his newspaper.

An election for the Parliament of the Province of Canada was held in November 1857. Brown did not want to run for the seat in Lambton because its constituency concerns took up much of his time and he wanted to focus on Reform party matters. Brown accepted the candidacy nomination for North Oxford because it would have fewer constituency affairs and, since it often elected Liberal candidates, he could campaign for other Liberal candidates elsewhere in the province. In Toronto, a petition circulated for Brown to run for one of its two seats. It was signed by groups that traditionally did not support Reform candidates, such as Orangemen, who felt that Conservative candidates were cooperating too much with French Canadians. Brown decided to run in both constituencies, focusing his attention on the Toronto campaign. Brown was elected in both constituencies, and his Reformers won the majority of seats in Canada West. His allies in the Parti Rouge were unsuccessful in Canada East and Brown returned to the legislature as an opposition member.

In the legislative session after the election, Brown served as the de facto leader of the opposition. On July 28, 1858, the cabinet of the Macdonald-Cartier administration resigned when the legislature rejected Ottawa as the new permanent capital of the province. Edmund Walker Head, the governor-general of Canada, asked Brown to form a new administration. Brown did not have a majority of support in the legislature, and he negotiated a cabinet under a co-premiership with Antoine-Aimé Dorion. Brown and the other members of his cabinet resigned their seats in parliament to run in a by-election, as was required by law. On August 2, the parliament passed an amendment stating that they did not approve of the administration, and Brown asked Head to call a general election. Head declined Brown's request, and on August 4, Brown resigned as co-Premier. Macdonald and Cartier were able to form a new ministry with Alexander Tilloch Galt.

On August 28, Brown won the by-election that was called because of his short appointment to the cabinet during the Brown-Dorion administration. Brown toured the province, giving speeches at various Reform gatherings that denounced the Cartier-Macdonald administration. In the 1859 Toronto mayoral election, the first where the electorate would directly vote for mayor, Brown organised the Municipal Reform Association to nominate Adam Wilson as the Reformer candidate; Wilson won the election over Conservative opponents.

In 1859 Brown and other Upper Canadian Reformers organised a convention in Toronto to discuss the governance of the province, in the hopes that agreeing to a unified policy would prevent divisions within the movement on the issue. Brown favoured creating a federalist system with the provinces (Canada West and Canada East) obtaining more control over its governance, as he felt this system would repel American encroachment into British North American territory west of Upper Canada and restrain what he saw as corruption exampled by the Conservative administration. Brown's speech at the convention supporting a federal government was positively received by the delegates, who passed resolutions supporting Brown's favoured policy positions. On April 30, 1860, Brown proposed a bill in the Province of Canada's legislature to form a convention that would discuss federalism. Brown convinced the majority of Reformers to support his resolution. The bill was defeated, but Reformers' support for federalism was documented in the vote.

Brown continued operating and investing in business ventures throughout Upper Canada. In the Globe he announced a new layout for the paper that allowed more text to be printed on each page; this was made possible by investments into new, copper-faced type. In Kent he sold some of the acres of land at his property and a cabinet factory to recover from financial difficulties, but gained a profit from his mills which sold hardwood to American lumber-dealers.

== Election defeat and marriage ==
Brown became sick in 1859 and its residual effects continued into 1860, exasperated by the stress of leading the Reform faction in parliament and growing financial concerns with his businesses. Brown's health deteriorated and in the winter of 1861, he stayed in his bed for over two months to recover, missing the entire 1861 parliamentary session. In the 1861 election, the Toronto Reform Association nominated Brown to be its candidate in the constituency of Toronto East. Brown struggled to campaign despite his health problems, and gave passionate speeches by the end of the campaign. He also struggled with having accomplished few of his proposed policies while he was a legislator. His Conservative opponent, John Willoughby Crawford, campaigned on similar policies to those that Brown advocated for, stating that if elected he would be a member of the ruling party and could accomplish policies that Brown struggled with as an opposition legislator. Crawford won the election, ending Brown's tenure as a legislator.

Although Conservative factions won another majority of seats in the parliament, their position was weak and only a few votes against the government could cause it to be disbanded. Even though Brown was defeated, he was still seen as a leader of the Liberal movement in Canada West and inquired with his Liberal eastern counterparts about forming a government should the Conservative coalition be defeated. When his inquiries were rejected, Brown used the opportunity to withdraw from public life, refusing requests to speak at rallies. In 1862 Brown's illness was still affecting him and he traveled to Great Britain to recover. He spent a month in London. While there he had a chance meeting with Tom Nelson, a schoolmate of his in Royal High School. Nelson convinced Brown to visit him in Edinburgh, where Brown met Nelson's sister Anne. Brown moved to a location close to the Nelson home, and courted Anne. She was of Scottish descent and helped shift his worldview and his views of the rights of minority groups. Five weeks after their first meeting, on November 27, they were wed at the Nelson's home. The couple departed to Toronto just over a week later.

== Return to legislature ==
With his health recovered Brown desired to return to politics, but also committed to his wife that his time in politics would be temporary and not his career, as she wanted to spend more time with him. In March 1863 the constituency of South Oxford held a byelection, and Reformers selected Brown as their candidate, even though he was unfamiliar with the riding's concerns. Brown won the by-election and when he returned to the legislature, he refrained from participating in major debates, instead investigating the various factions to determine who he wanted to align himself with.

Although he had aligned himself with Reform politicians in previous sessions, Brown was considered an outsider as he was not at the legislature during debates about secularism in schools and representation by population in the previous months. John A. Macdonald proposed a motion of no confidence against the moderatly-Liberal joint-administration of John Sandfield Macdonald and Antoine-Aimé Dorion, intending to form a new administration that was more Conservative and hoping a vote would create division within the Upper Canadian Reform-Liberal faction. Brown opposed the motion in a speech in the legislature, stating that while he did not approve some of the moderate policies of the Macdonald-Dorion administration, he thought they were a better option than a conservative administration. While Macdonald's motion was successful, the Liberal party remained mostly united. Instead of forming a new ministry with Macdonald, Sandfield Macdonald requested that the governor-general, Charles Monck, call an election, which was granted. Brown declined John Sandfield's invitation to join a reconstituted ministry if Reformers were successful after the election, and instead made a deal to support a ministry that included Dorion as co-premier, invite other Reformers into the ministry and to implement representation by population.

In the general election, Brown defeated Ephraim Cook in the constituency of South Oxford. Conservatives won the majority of seats in Canada East while Reformers won the majority of seats in Canada West and barely had a majority in the legislature. When Parliament returned, Reformers wanted Brown to be elected as the Speaker of the House, but Brown declined, stating he wanted a candidate who could garner more votes from Lower Canadian legislators: after Brown consulted with the executive administration, Reformers elected Lewis Wallbridge. In mid-January 1864, Brown's daughter Margaret was born. On January 15, Brown began publishing Canada Farmer, focusing on rural Canadian affairs; the journal was financially successful.

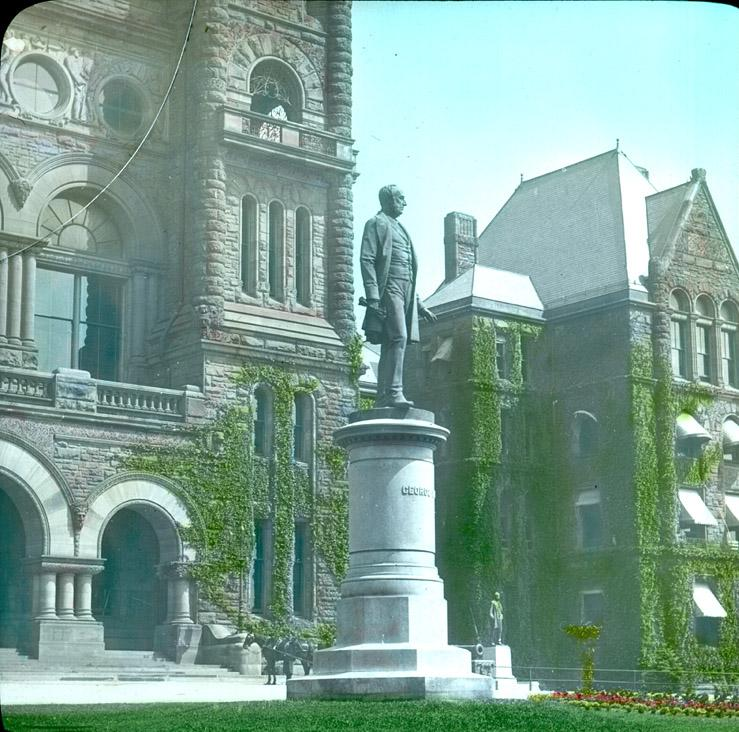
Monument to George Brown at Queen's Park, Toronto, Ontario, Canada, c. 1910

Canadian legislators were worried that the United States government would terminate the Canadian–American Reciprocity Treaty. Sandfield Macdonald offered Brown a position in Washington D.C. as a Canadian emissary to advocate for the treaty's continuation; Brown refused, indicating that he did not want to leave Canada for a significant period of time. The Canadian legislature was besieged by deadlock, making governing the province difficult. Brown proposed a resolution to establish a select committee to investigate the sectional problems in Canada and propose solutions; the resolution passed the legislature two months later with Brown as the committee's chairman. Brown announced the committee's recommendations on June 14 for a new federal system of government, either within the Province of Canada or with other provinces within British North America. That same day, the MacDonald-Taché administration was dissolved. Brown stated that he would support any administration that committed to solving the deadlock in the legislature. Brown, MacDonald, Taché, and George-Étienne Cartier agreed to form an administration later called the Great Coalition to seek a federal union with the Atlantic provinces. Brown became the president of the council, a cabinet-level position, under the premiership of Taché.

== Confederation ==
Brown attended the Charlottetown Conference where Canadian delegates outlined their proposal for Canadian Confederation with the Atlantic provinces. On September 5, 1864, Brown outlined the proposed constitutional structure for the union. The conference accepted the proposal in principle and Brown attended subsequent meetings in Halifax, Nova Scotia and Saint John, New Brunswick to determine the details of the union.

During the Quebec Conference, Brown argued for separate provincial and federal governments. He hoped the provincial government would remove local concerns from the federal government, which he thought were more politically divisive. He also argued for an appointed Senate because he saw upper houses as inherently conservative and believed they protected the interests of the rich. He wished to deny the Senate the legitimacy and power that naturally follow with an electoral mandate. He was also concerned that two elected legislative bodies could create a political deadlock, especially if different parties held a majority of seats in each body. The result of the Quebec Conference was the Quebec Resolutions. Brown presented the Quebec Resolutions in a speech in Toronto on November 3. Later that month, he travelled to England to begin discussions with British officials about Canadian confederation, the integration of the North West Territories into Canada, and the defence of British North America from possible American invasion.

Brown realized that satisfaction for Canada West could only be achieved with the support of the French-speaking majority of Canada East. In his speech in support of Confederation in the Legislature of the Province of Canada on February 8, 1865, he spoke glowingly of the prospects for Canada's future, and he insisted that "whether we ask for parliamentary reform for Canada alone or in union with the Maritime Provinces, the views of French Canadians must be consulted as well as ours. This scheme can be carried, and no scheme can be that has not the support of both sections of the province." Although he supported the idea of a legislative union at the Quebec Conference, Brown was eventually persuaded to favour the federal view of Confederation, which was closer to that supported by Cartier and the Bleus of Canada East, as it was the structure that would ensure that the provinces retained sufficient control over local matters to satisfy the need of the French-speaking population in Canada East for jurisdiction over matters that it considered to be essential to its survival. Brown remained a proponent of a stronger central government, with weaker constituent provincial governments.

In May and June, Brown was part of a delegation sent to London to continue discussions about confederation with British officials. The British government agreed to support Canadian confederation, defend Canada if attacked by the US, and help with establishing a new trade agreement with the US. In September, Galt and Brown represented the Province of Canada at the Confederate Trade Council, a meeting of Canadian colonies to negotiate common trade policies after the colonies' reciprocity trade agreement with the United States was terminated. During the meeting, Brown spoke with Maritime delegates to gather support for the Canadian confederation, as support for the project was decreasing in New Brunswick and Nova Scotia. He supported the council's resolution to pursue trade policies that reduced tariffs with the US. The administration for the Province of Canada disagreed and sought to increase tariffs on American goods. Brown, frustrated with his cabinet colleagues over this issue, resigned from the Great Coalition on December 19.

Brown renewed relationships with Rouge colleagues to strengthen the Reform party's political prospects in Canada West. He lost an election in Southern Ontario for a seat in the new legislature. He determined that too many Reformers joined Macdonald and the Conservatives during the Great Coalition, and the public supported this non-partisan administration. He declined to run in safer constituencies and went on a holiday to Scotland.

== Post-parliamentary career ==
In 1866, Brown bought an estate near Brantford, Upper Canada, and herded shorthorn cattle. He continued writing and editing the Globe and was consulted by Grit officials in issues concerning provincial and Canadian politics. Brown fought numerous battles with the typographical union from 1843 to 1872. He was forced to pay union wages after tense negotiations and strikes.

In 1874, Prime Minister Alexander Mackenzie asked Brown to negotiate a new reciprocity treaty with the US. He negotiated with the United States Secretary of State Hamilton Fish from February until June 18, when a draft of their treaty was proposed in the US Congress. The Congress did not pass the bill into law and it was set aside when Congress adjourned four days after the treaty was proposed.

Brown was appointed to the Canadian senate in 1874 and attended his first session the following year. He supported Mackenzie when Edward Blake and the Canada First movement expressed their frustrations with Mackenzie's leadership. His attendance in the senate was sporadic as he focused on the business affairs at his ranch. He travelled to England in February 1876 to raise capital to create a new company based on raising cattle, and obtained a charter for the new company upon his return to Canada in May. His company struggled to be financially successful and two fires in December 1879 destroyed many of the buildings on the property.

== Death ==
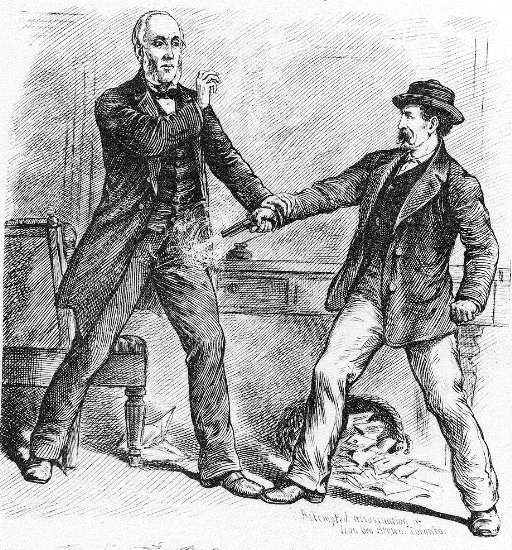
Fatal shooting of George Brown, Toronto

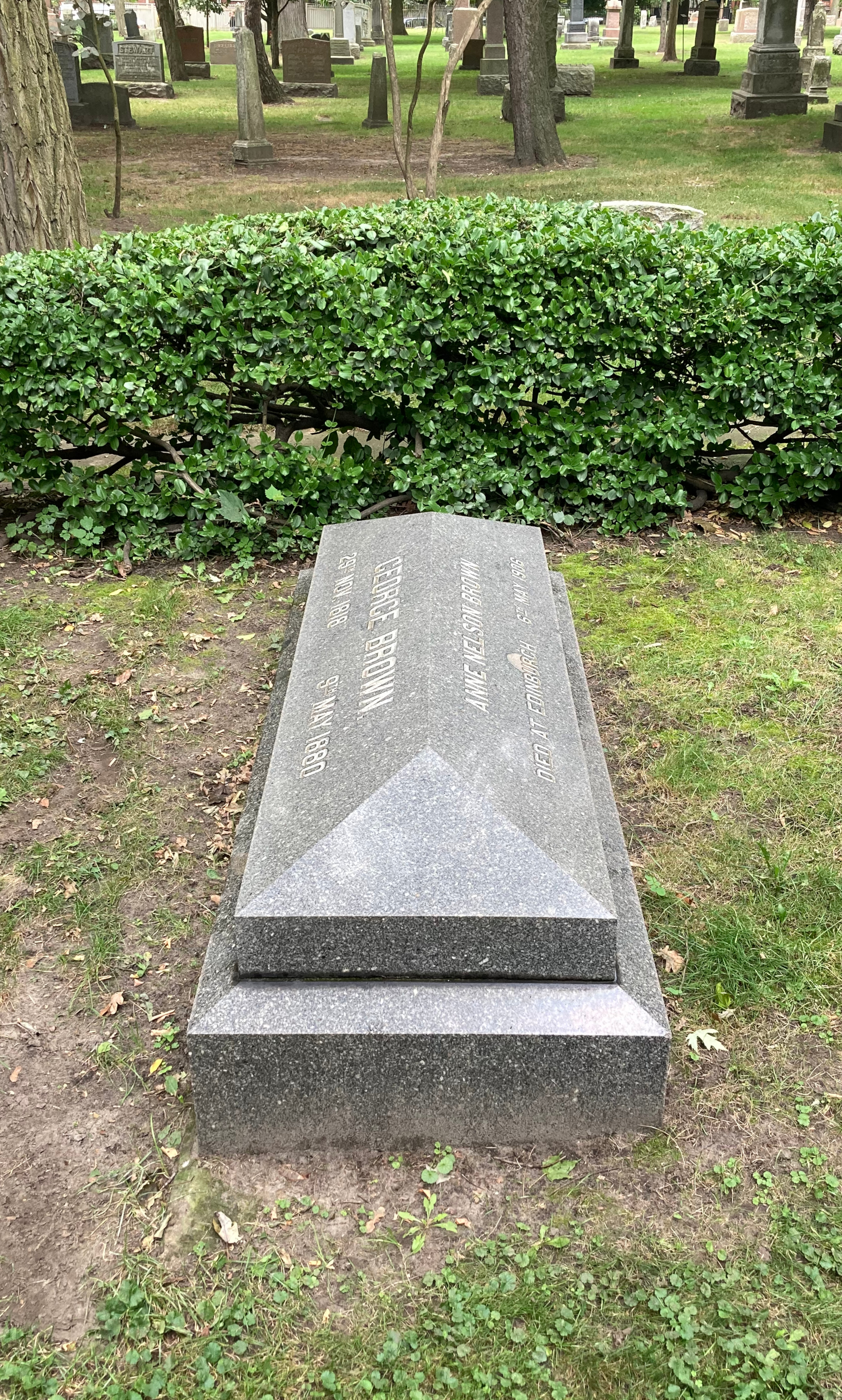
Brown's grave at Toronto Necropolis

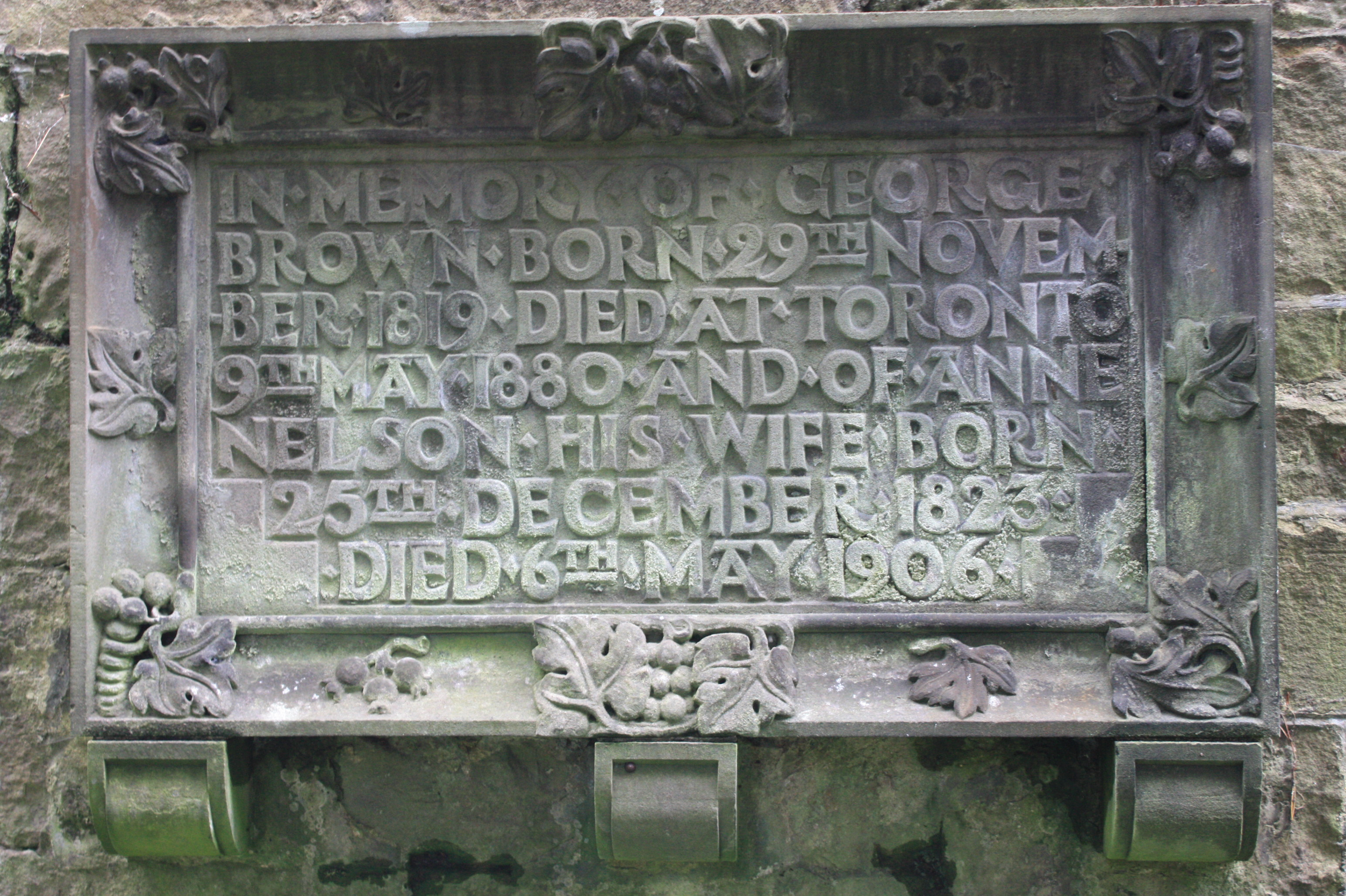
The grave of Anne Nelson, George Brown's wife, Dean Cemetery

In 1880 the Globe was also struggling financially as Brown paid for updating the newspaper's printing press in order to produce multi-page and machine-folded papers. On March 25, 1880, a former Globe employee, George Bennett, burst into Brown's office; he was recently fired by a foreman and wanted a certificate that showed he had worked for the paper for five years. Brown did not recognise the man, so asked him to speak with the foreman. The two men argued and Bennett pulled out a gun. Brown grabbed for the gun, but it fired a bullet into Brown's thigh. Bennett was secured by other men and the wound was deemed minor. Brown left the office and stayed in his Toronto home to recover. His leg became infected and he obtained a fever and delirium. On May 9, 1880, Brown died in his Toronto home. Brown was buried at Toronto Necropolis. Bennett was subsequently charged and hanged.

His wife, Anne Nelson, returned to Scotland thereafter where she died in 1906. She is buried on the southern terrace of Dean Cemetery in Edinburgh. The grave also commemorates George Brown. In 1885 his daughters Margaret and Catherine were two of the first women to graduate from the University of Toronto.

== Political philosophy and views ==
Brown was raised as a member of the Church of Scotland. Canadian historian J. M. S. Careless described the family's faith as further from the Calvinist interpretation of the bible and more closely followed the tenets of the evangelical movement of the 1800s. Brown advocated for a Puritan separation between politics and religion; he believed that political liberty could only be achieved if religious institutions were not involved in politics, and while he believed everyone should be Christian, he thought political institutions should not influence religion. In 1850, although he was against giving state money to religions in clergy reserves, he was willing to tolerate it in order to maintain an allegiance between the Upper Canadian Reformers and French Canadian Catholic Reformers.

Brown was against slavery and believed that the largest fault of the United States was the enslavement of people in American southern states. He was part of the Elgin Association, a group of mostly Free Kirk people that purchased land in Kent county for escaped slaves to live on. He also wrote editorials in The Globe defending a settlement of escaped slaves in Buxton from hostile white inhabitants in Kent. He was also an executive member of the Anti-Slavery Society of Canada.

Throughout the Province of Canada's existence, Brown advocated against dissolving the union. In the 1850s he was worried that a dissolved union would cause the St Lawrence River, a major thorough way for trade, to be hampered by the two jurisdictions imposing different rules on their section of the river. When choosing how to transport their goods, farmers to the west of Upper Canada might use the Erie Canal in the United States instead (as this route would have one set of rules) and potentially setting up American annexation of those lands. Instead, Brown wanted a federal union that would have jurisdiction over joint concerns while each section would create laws for their own territory. Brown advocated for representation by population as a way to ensure the French population did not have out-sized power. He wanted to maintain the defensive and trade advantages that a unified province would have and looked to incorporate the Maritime provinces into the union.

== Legacy ==
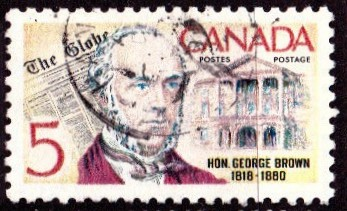
George Brown stamp, issued by Canada Post

Brown's residence, formerly called Lambton Lodge and now called George Brown House, at 186 Beverley Street, Toronto, was named a National Historic Site of Canada in 1974. It is now operated by the Ontario Heritage Trust as a conference centre and offices.

Brown also maintained an estate, Bow Park, near Brantford, Ontario. Bought in 1826, it was a cattle farm during Brown's time and is currently a seed farm.

Toronto's George Brown Polytechnic (founded 1967 as George Brown College) is named after him. A statue of Brown can be found on the front west lawn of Queen's Park and another on Parliament Hill in Ottawa (sculpted by George William Hill in 1913).

He was portrayed by Peter Outerbridge in the 2011 CBC Television film John A.: Birth of a Country.

George Brown appears on a Canadian postage stamp issued on August 21, 1968.

== Electoral record ==
1867 Canadian federal election: South riding of Ontario
Party	Candidate	Votes
Liberal-Conservative	Thomas Nicholson Gibbs	1,292
Liberal	George Brown	1,223
Source: Canadian Elections Database

Political offices
Preceded by Sir John A. Macdonald	Joint Premiers of the Province of Canada – Canada West; August 2–6, 1858	Succeeded by Sir John A. Macdonald
Party political offices
Preceded by none	Leader of the Liberal Party of Canada West/Ontario Liberal Party; 1857–1873	Succeeded by Archibald McKellar
Preceded by Robert Baldwin as Reformer Leader	Leader of the Liberal Party of Canada unofficial 1857–1873	Succeeded by Alexander Mackenzie
