= George Bennett (murderer) =

George Bennett (died 23 July 1880) was a Canadian newspaper employee who was convicted of the murder of George Brown, publisher of the Toronto Globe. He insisted until the day of his execution that he had not intended to kill Brown.

== Early life ==
Little is known about Bennett's early life. He claimed to have Roman Catholic parents. He was a native of Cobourg, Ontario.

== Background to armed confrontation with George Brown ==
Bennett had been an employee of the Toronto Globe where George Brown was founder and editor. He had been dismissed after repeated problems with drinking and general work habits.

An armed confrontation with the editor ensued on 24 March 1880. This resulted in a bullet wound that became infected and led to Brown's death.

=== Execution of Bennett ===
After Brown had succumbed to his injuries seven weeks subsequent to Bennett's armed attack, Bennett was tried and hanged on conviction, a few weeks later.

== See also ==
- George Brown (Canadian politician)#Legacy
- The Globe (Toronto newspaper)#History
