= Jonathan McCully =

Canadian Father of Confederation (1809–1877)

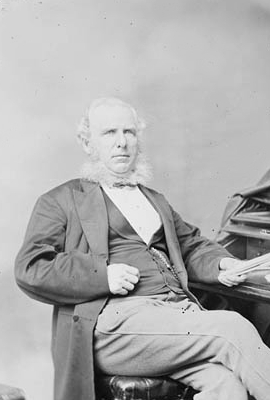
The Honourable Jonathan McCully

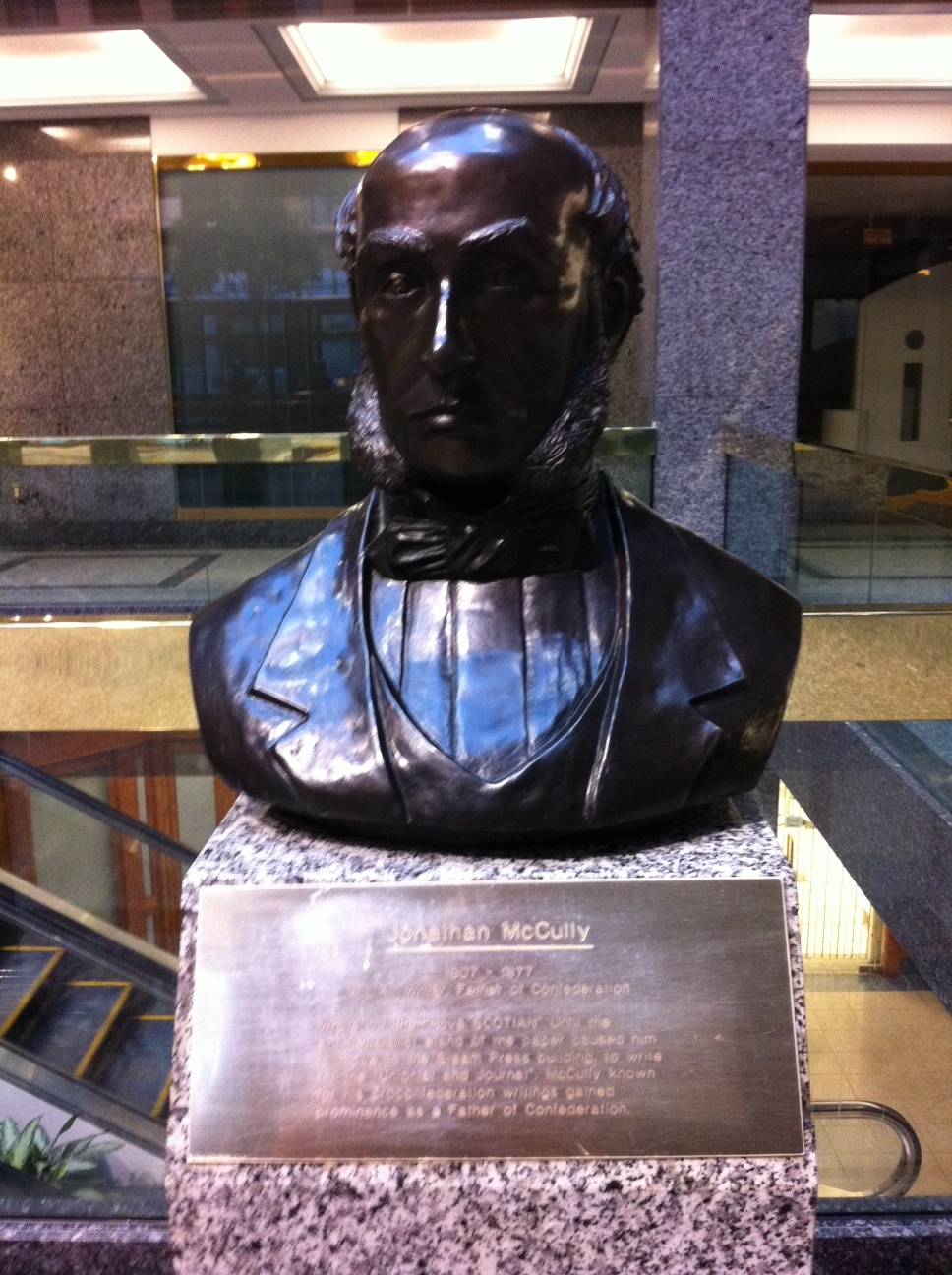
Jonathan McCully By Peter Bustin, Founders Square, Halifax, Nova Scotia.

Jonathan McCully (July 25, 1809 – January 2, 1877) was a participant at the Confederation conferences at Charlottetown, Quebec City, and in London, and is thus considered one of the Fathers of Confederation. He did much to promote union through newspaper editorials. For his efforts, he received a Senate appointment. He later became a judge of the Nova Scotia Supreme Court.

McCully was born at his family's farm in Cumberland County, Nova Scotia. He attended various local schools before going to work on the family farm. From 1828 to 1830, he taught school in order to fund his legal studies. One of his pupils was Sir Charles Tupper. He was called to the Nova Scotia bar in 1837, and set up his practice in Amherst. In 1842 he married Eliza Creed.

A confirmed Liberal by 1837, he expressed his views in frequent contributions to the Acadian Recorder. In addition, he was a contributor to the Halifax Morning Chronicle, the major Liberal newspaper of the province of Nova Scotia. Although he took a marginal role at the conferences at Charlottetown and Quebec City he was an important promoter of union to Nova Scotians through editorials in both the Morning Chronicle and the Unionist & Halifax Journal. After the passage of the union resolution in 1866 McCully eased this newspaper crusade.

His support of Joseph Howe during the 1847 election earned him an appointment to the Legislative Council where he held various offices. When the Liberals were re-elected in 1860 he became solicitor general and railway commissioner. His policy of cost cutting over efficiency, and his lack of personal popularity, caused Joseph Howe to blame him for the 1863 Liberal election loss.

Despite being the Liberal leader in the Legislative Council in 1864 Jonathan McCully's name was not on the initial list of delegates to the Charlottetown Conference. After one of the other delegates withdrew Charles Tupper picked McCully as a replacement. Although Jonathan McCully was not previously a strong supporter of union he was converted at the Charlottetown meeting. He was a delegate to the London Conference but made few contributions to the proceedings.

For his support of Confederation, McCully was appointed to the Senate of Canada in 1867. He was soon overshadowed by his more prominent colleagues Charles Tupper, Adams George Archibald and eventually even Joseph Howe. He supported the "better terms" offered to Nova Scotia in 1869. He resigned the Senate of Canada when he was appointed puisne judge of the Nova Scotia Supreme Court in 1870. While his taste for efficiency was unpopular with lawyers, his personal popularity amongst Nova Scotians rose for the first time.

He died at his home in Halifax, Nova Scotia on January 2, 1877 and was buried in that city at Camp Hill Cemetery. His Halifax residence was designated as a National Historic Site of Canada in 1975, due to its associations with McCully.
