= Charlottetown Conference =

1864 conference to discuss Canadian confederation

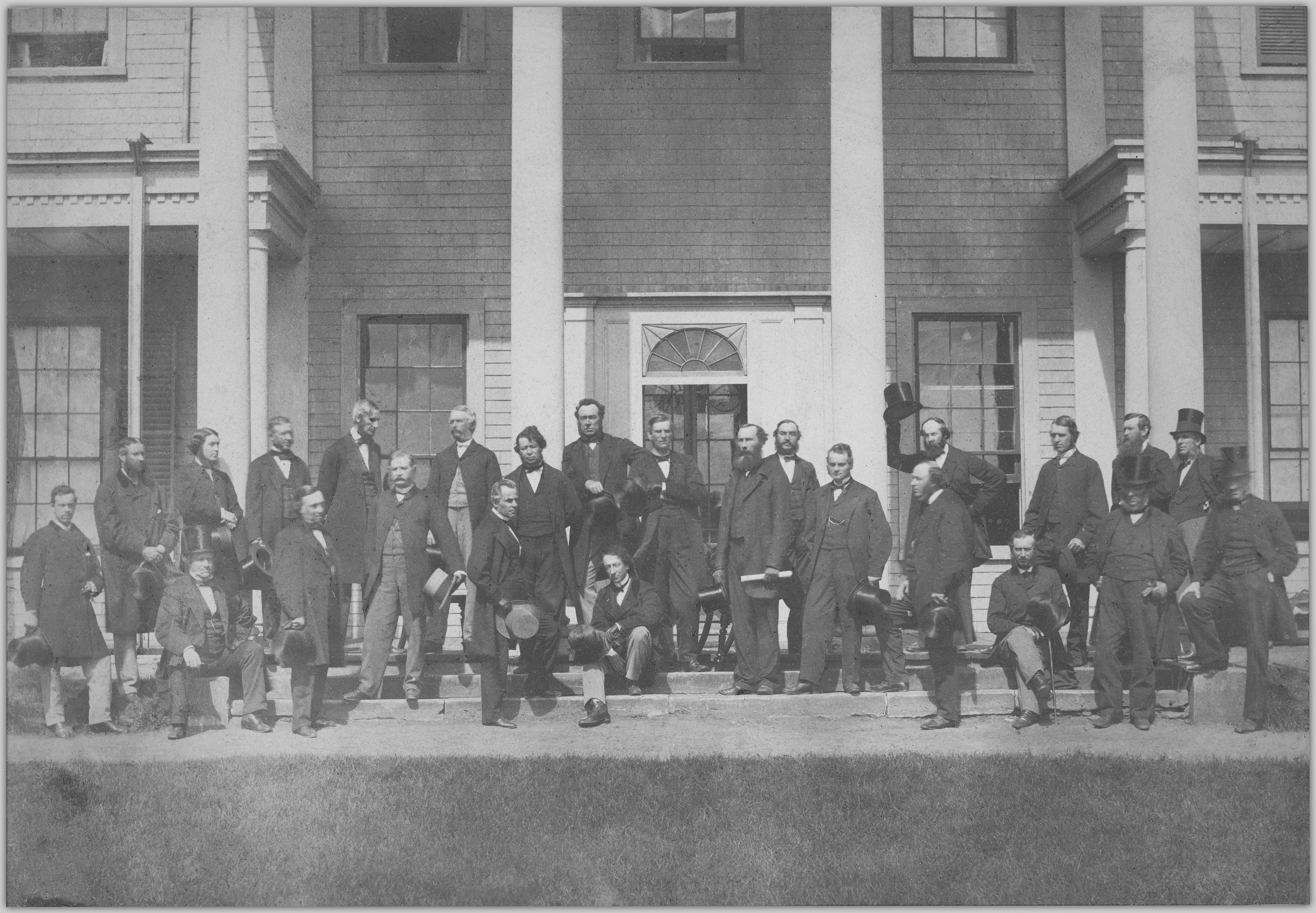
Delegates of the Charlottetown Conference on the steps of Government House

The Charlottetown Conference (French: Conférence de Charlottetown) was a political conference for representatives from colonies of British North America to discuss Canadian Confederation. The conference took place during September 1–9, 1864 in Charlottetown, Prince Edward Island. The conference had been planned as a meeting of representatives from the Maritime colonies; Nova Scotia, New Brunswick and Prince Edward Island. Britain encouraged a Maritime Union between these colonies, hoping that they would then become less economically and politically dependent on the Crown, and provide for greater economic and military power for the region in light of the American Civil War. However, another colony, the Province of Canada, comprising present-day Ontario and Quebec, heard news of the planned conference and asked that the agenda be expanded to discuss a union that would also include them.

Coincidentally there was a circus in Charlottetown during the conference, and it was much more interesting to the majority of the population. At the very least, the circus made making accommodations for all the delegates difficult, since there had not been a circus on Prince Edward Island in over 20 years. There was no one working at the public wharf at the foot of Great George Street when the Canadian delegates arrived on the steamship SS Victoria, so Prince Edward Island representative William Henry Pope had to handle receptions by himself, including rowing out to greet the new arrivals. Owing to the unexpectedly large number of visitors in the city, a sizeable proportion of the Canadian delegates remained aboard the Queen Victoria while others found accommodations at the Franklin. Meanwhile, circus-goers and the Maritime delegates had taken up the accommodations in town.

== Conference ==
There is no formal transcript of the Charlottetown meetings. What historians have learned now has been gathered from private sources, such as letters written home by delegates. We know that there was agreement on the need for a detailed discussion of a potential union. It is known that the Maritime delegates put aside their idea of Maritime Union, while the Canadians could see solutions to their own problems in a larger union.

The majority of the conference took place at the colony's legislative building, Province House, although some social functions such as dinners and banquets were held at other venues including Government House and Inkerman House, the home of the colony's Lieutenant Governor.

The conference had begun on Thursday September 1 with a banquet for the delegates. Parties and banquets were held each night after the day's discussions had ended, except for Sunday September 4, when they did not meet. The representatives from the Province of Canada dominated the conference, overshadowing the concerns of the Maritimes, and laying out foundations for the union that benefited them the most. Four of the first five days were spent outlining the Canadian position, and the Maritime representatives did not discuss their own plans until September 6 and 7. One Canadian delegate, George Brown, spent two days discussing the details of the proposed constitution, which would keep Canada within the British Empire.

Most of the Maritimes were convinced that a wider union including the Province of Canada would also be beneficial to them; Prince Edward Island was unsure, however, and very much against confederation. The delegates also believed that union could be achieved within a few years, rather than in an undefined period in the future as they had originally planned. The initial intentions of the conference was for the Maritimes to discuss the possibility of a union within provinces. The Province of Canada (consisting of present-day Ontario and Quebec) requested one of their own delegates to attend the conference. If not for the inclusion of 8 Canadian delegates from the province of Canada, the constitution would not have been proposed within federal union.

The conference concluded on Wednesday September 7, but the representatives agreed to meet again the next month in both Halifax, Nova Scotia, and Quebec City (see Quebec Conference). A ball was also held on September 8, after which the delegates returned home. In addition to political meetings, the delegates participated in social activities like special lunches, small boating trips, and a ball, which gave delegates the opportunity to bond. The delegates from the respective provinces met again on September 10 and 12, 1864 in Halifax, Nova Scotia, where further discussions arose regarding the union and idea of the constitution. Following meetings in Halifax, representatives met in Quebec city, on October 10 to 27, 1864. The Quebec Conference fostered a draft constitution for the proposed federal union.

== Confederation ==
Canada was founded on July 1, 1867 through negotiation at the aforementioned conferences above. To the south, during the Civil War, the United States Army grew dramatically in size. Some historians believe that Confederation was a pre-emptive action to reduce the chances that territories in northern and western Canada would be annexed by the United States.

== Delegates ==
=== New Brunswick ===
- Edward Barron Chandler
- John Hamilton Gray
- John Mercer Johnson
- Albert James Smith
- William H. Steeves
- Samuel Leonard Tilley

=== Nova Scotia ===
- Adams George Archibald
- Robert B. Dickey
- William Alexander Henry
- Jonathan McCully
- Charles Tupper

=== Prince Edward Island ===
- George Coles
- Andrew Archibald Macdonald
- Edward Palmer
- William Henry Pope
- John Hamilton Gray

=== Province of Canada ===
- George Brown
- Alexander Campbell
- George-Étienne Cartier
- Alexander Tilloch Galt
- Hector-Louis Langevin
- John A. Macdonald
- William McDougall
- Thomas D'Arcy McGee
- John Ross

== See also ==
- Quebec Conference, 1864
- London Conference, 1866
- Anti-Confederation Party
