= Quebec Conference, 1864 =

Conference on Canadian Confederation

The Quebec Conference (French: Conférence de Québec) was held from October 10 to 27, 1864, to discuss a proposed Canadian Confederation. It was in response to the shift in political ground when the United Kingdom and the United States had come very close to engaging in war with each other. Therefore, the overall goal of the conference was to elaborate on policies surrounding federalism and creating a single state, both of which had been discussed at the Charlottetown Conference around a month earlier. Canada West leader John A. Macdonald requested Governor-General Charles Monck to invite all representatives from the three Maritime provinces and Newfoundland to meet with the candidates who formed the United Canada to Quebec in October 1864. Although Newfoundland sent two observers, it did not participate directly in the proceedings.

== The beginnings at Charlottetown ==
The Charlottetown Conference of September 1864, laid the foundations for the Quebec Conference and was a significant meeting that would determine what would be discussed in the Quebec Conference. During the Conference, the Canadians found support for the confederation, as discussions pointed towards a unified decision to unite the provinces under the name of Canada. The Canada West member, Macdonald, who would be highly prominent in the Quebec Conference, began to find allies that would enable him to have a more dominant and influential role in the Quebec Conference a month later. One key alliance made in the Charlottetown Conference that would transfer over to the Quebec Conference was made between the Maritime delegates and Macdonald as they saw him as less abrasive than the other Canada West official, George Brown. Macdonald appealed to the Maritime populace as he seemed a more friendly and diplomatic alliance than George Brown, and in terms of Canada East politician, George-Étienne Cartier, Macdonald was an anglophone, and although Cartier was prominent at the discussions at Charlottetown, the Maritime politicians were yet to get used to the influence and power of the francophone politicians.

On the fifth and final day of the conference, it was clear that a second part of the confederation deal was on the verge of being consummated and that the Charlottetown Conference had been making a breakthrough on the policy of Confederation. The Maritime politicians, however, struggled to agree and accept the details of the Canadians' proposal. On 10 September 1864, in Halifax three days later, they drew up plans to hold another conference in Quebec to finalize the negotiations made during the last few days. They drew up motions for the Quebec Conference after the conclusion of Charlottetown, where they would focus on the confederation of British North America. They also agreed to invite a delegation from Newfoundland, as they were not involved in negotiations at Charlottetown Therefore, the members of Charlottetown wanted to include all provinces of Canada in the negotiations at the Quebec Conference as the Charlottetown Conference had laid the foundations of discussions at the Quebec Conference. During the period between the two sessions, the members of Charlottetown prepared a list of resolutions that would be passed at the Quebec Conference, which proposed the constitution of a new union. These were going to become the "72 Resolutions."

== Conference ==
The conference involved 33 delegates from various regions of Canada. The meeting included members from Canada East- George-Étienne Cartier, Étienne-Paschal Taché as well as Thomas D'Arcy McGee. Those from Canada West included George Brown and John A. Macdonald. Members in New Brunswick who also featured were John Hamilton Gray and Samuel Leonard Tilley. Nova Scotian delegates featured Adams George Archibald and Charles Tupper. Newfoundland sent two delegates whose mere purpose was to observe proceedings and Prince Edward Island sent George Coles and William Henry Pope. The two Newfoundland delegates were Frederick Carter and Ambrose Shea, who were not government members. Overall Nova Scotia had five members, New Brunswick and Prince Edward Island had seven each, and the total made up all the delegates, making up all of the Maritime delegates. There were 32 delegates in total, and were given sets of calling cards, with the names and photo identification so everyone was clear with names and where certain people represented. The Conference lasted 14 days, but to some people, such as Edward Goff Penny, editor of the Montreal Herald, and an eventual senator, complained that this was too little time to conclude proceedings.

The major source of conflict at the conference was between those who favoured a "legislative union" a unitary state, such as John A. Macdonald, and those who favoured stronger provincial rights. The Conference tied in very closely with the discussions of the aforementioned Charlottetown Conference, as the topics being discussed in Quebec centred around whether the country should have a strong and single central government, or a more encompassing federal system. Representatives from the Maritimes and Canada East (now Quebec) tended to argue for provincial rights, fearing they would lose their cultural identity under a centralized unitary state. John A. Macdonald thought the failure of a weak central power was evident in the American Civil War, which was still being fought in the United States as the delegates met in Charlottetown and Quebec. The delegates eventually compromised, dividing powers between a "general" parliament and "local" provincial legislatures. They also decided to have an elected lower house, the House of Commons of Canada, and an appointed upper house, the Senate of Canada, although there was considerable debate about how many senators each province would have. The Prince Edward Island delegation called for a scheme similar to the Triple-E Senate proposal of the 1990s. Eventually, a proposed structure for the government was written out in the form of the seventy-two resolutions at the end of the conference.

Following on from the topic of the proposed division of the central government into the upper house, that would be based on regional representation and the lower house that would represent the population, this was a key topic in both the Charlottetown Conference and the Quebec Conference. This topic was discussed at length during the conference with one examiner outlining that the meeting on October 24, 1864, that the topic was "debated all day with considerable warmth and ability but no agreement come to". He also outlined that "lower Canada complains that in the number proposed for her, 24, she would be unfairly represented (in the upper house), with it being proposed that upper Canada should have the same number." This discussion carried on over into the Quebec Conference in the hope that an agreement could be eventually made considering that it was not concluded at the end of the Charlottetown Conference.

In terms of what the regions as a whole desired, it was quite overtly clear. Delegates from the Maritimes feared that a legislative union which the aforementioned John A. Macdonald was promoting, as they believed it would result in the loss of their identity as other nations would have an overbearing influence. However, the smaller Maritime colonies saw the Senate as a means of strengthening their regional representation to offset their regional weakness in the so-called lower house. Cartier represented the interests of Quebec at the conference. Like the delegates from the Maritimes, he was more invested in the conference although he made it abundantly clear that the province needed a strong provincial government that would be able to protect their language, civil customs and local laws. Although he was not wholeheartedly against such political reform, he believed that Quebec should still maintain its identity.

In terms of priorities at the Conference, there were many differing agendas, especially the Maritime regions that, as mentioned earlier, saw a federalized state as beneficial to their economy and commerce. An example of this was the role of John A. Carter, one of the Newfoundland diplomats invited to the conference, as he outlined the importance of the fisheries to the Newfoundland economy, and that a newly formed federalized state would open up a wide field of enterprise both with internal trade in Canada and within the continent of North America as a whole. However, one concern of the Maritime colonies was that they benefited from free trade and the aforementioned commerce of fishing for their livelihood, Canada was more concerned about industrialization in all the provinces, creating significant improvements to the Canadian economy. Such a concern was raised during the Conference as the Maritime colonies wished to maintain their stable economy. In contrast, some members from Prince Edward Island was highly skeptical of a union as advocated by Macdonald, as they were concerned about the Island's autonomy if there was a confederation. The concept of particularism, with paranoia surrounding an overpowering Canada dictating Maritime policy, was a salient characteristic of political thinking among numerous people in Nova Scotia, New Brunswick and Prince Edward Island. That demonstrated that even within the Maritimes, there were varying degrees of skepticism, with some parts more in favour than others highlighting the complexities of the Maritimes. One key figure, Charles Tupper who was a politician from Nova Scotia who formed close alliances with John A. Macdonald, sympathized with the goal of confederation and stated that the Maritimes "could never hope to occupy a position of influence or importance except in connection with their larger sister Canada." That highlighted the varying degrees in which delegates from the Maritimes viewed the idea of confederation.

== Result ==
Overall, the result was a compromise, as each province would have its own legislature and the power of government was divided up between the federal and provincial governments. It was decided that the central administrative area was to be placed in Ottawa, where the central government would reside. Delegates consolidated their previous agreement at the Charlottetown Conference, that the central government would have a lower house based on population and an upper house reflective of regional representation. The three separate regions of Ontario, Quebec, and the three Maritime provinces would all have 24 seats in the appointment chamber. The actual overall result meant that Canada incorporated portions of both the British Unitary system and the American federal system. The "72 Resolutions" were drawn up by the end of the conference, which maintained none of the democratic principles as demonstrated in the United States. The resolutions did not guarantee the protection for the rights of French Canadians and excluded them extensively in other parts of the legislature.

However, the Christian faith was well protected as both Catholics and Protestant minorities were granted Canada’s equality of rights and special privileges in anything involving education. Such resolutions received wide recognition and support from the colonial office. In Lower Canada, Reformers opposed the resolutions but were the only group to do so. In Nova Scotia, pressure was needed to force through legislative approval of the resolutions. Additionally, the federal government was given considerable power over the provinces, as was demonstrated under the power of disallowance, which gave the federal government the ability to reject provincial laws of which they did not approve. Other regions were considered as a result of the conference, including Newfoundland, British Columbia and the “North West Territory", to eventually enter Canada on equal terms later. Although the Quebec Conference changed the political influence in Canada considerably, the British crown would maintain its position as the head of the government and the protector and head of executive authority.

== The 72 Resolutions ==
The Resolutions were highly comprehensive. The first few resolutions outlined that the general government would ensure that the intercolonial railway would be completed from Riviere-du-Loup, through New Brunswick and end up at Truro in Nova Scotia. The delegates from Nova Scotia also admitted that the building of the railway with the full financial backing of the central government was key in swaying the Maritimes decision to back a centralized government. The arrangements proposed by Alexander Galt in terms of finance, predominantly focusing on existing debts of various debts owed by certain colonies should be divided and shared. Some of the final resolutions outline that her the Queen possess considerable power over the course of proceedings as Resolution 71 underlined that the Queen was to be solicited to determine the rank and name of the federated provinces. Resolution 60 outlined that the central government would tackle the debts of all the provinces and aid the payments of all those involved. What was eventually enacted was the policy which resulted in each province being compensated by a federal transfer resulting in 80 cents per head.

The Quebec resolutions received increasing support from the colonial office, with the only opposing group being the Lower Canadian Reformers who had not been drafted into the coalition. In both Nova Scotia and New Brunswick, considerable pressure was needed to formulate and pass through legislative approval. Prince Edward Island did not join the newly formed unified Canada until around 1873. The 72 Resolutions significantly influenced the British North America Act, as will be discussed in the next section, and little was altered or changed to the resolutions when enacted in London.

== The British North America Act, 1867 and the Quebec Conference's legacy ==
The British North America Act received royal assent on 28 March 1867 by Queen Victoria, and by 22 May, all three provinces (Nova Scotia, New Brunswick, and Canada). Upper and Lower Canada were to be split into Ontario (Upper Canada) and Quebec (Lower Canada). All of these provinces were to be unified by 1 July 1867, three years after the agreement was made at the Quebec Conference. In the act, it was clearly stated that 'not being more than six months of passing this act, the provinces of Canada, Nova Scotia and New Brunswick shall form and be one dominion under the name of Canada.' It went onto outline that 'Canada shall be divided into four provinces, named Ontario, Quebec, Nova Scotia and New Brunswick.' However, although Canada was unified under the British North America Act, the act contained no general declaration or recognition of the fact that Canada was a bilingual and bicultural nation. Overall, the British North America Act consolidated the 72 Resolutions as passed by the Quebec Conference.

== Delegates ==
=== Canada East ===
- George-Étienne Cartier
- Jean-Charles Chapais
- Alexander Tilloch Galt
- Hector-Louis Langevin
- Thomas D'Arcy McGee
- Étienne-Paschal Taché

=== Canada West ===
- George Brown
- Alexander Campbell
- James Cockburn
- John A. Macdonald
- William McDougall
- Oliver Mowat

=== New Brunswick ===
- Edward Barron Chandler
- Charles Fisher
- John Hamilton Gray
- John Mercer Johnson
- Peter Mitchell
- William H. Steeves
- Samuel Leonard Tilley

=== Nova Scotia ===
- Adams George Archibald
- Robert B. Dickey
- William Alexander Henry
- Jonathan McCully
- Charles Tupper
- John William Ritchie
- Joseph Howe

=== Prince Edward Island ===
- George Coles
- John Hamilton Gray
- Thomas Heath Haviland
- Andrew Archibald Macdonald
- Edward Palmer
- William Henry Pope
- Edward Whelan

=== Newfoundland (observers) ===
- Frederick Carter
- Ambrose Shea

== See also ==
- Charlottetown Conference, 1864
- London Conference, 1866
- Anti-Confederation Party
