= 1866 London Conference =

Final conference leading to Confederation of Canada

The London Conference (French: Conférence de Londres) was held in London, in the United Kingdom, in 1866. It was the third and final in a series of conferences that led to Canadian Confederation in 1867. Sixteen delegates from the Province of Canada, Nova Scotia, and New Brunswick gathered to set out the final outline of the proposed Canadian Confederation, resulting in the British North America Act, 1867 (now the Constitution Act, 1867).

Upon the conclusion of the discussions by the delegates, the British government directed that a bill be drafted to implement the resolutions of the Conference. Introduced in 1867, the British North America Act, 1867 was passed by both Houses of Parliament and then received royal assent from Queen Victoria on March 29, 1867. It was proclaimed in force on July 1, 1867, creating the Dominion of Canada.

== The Conference ==
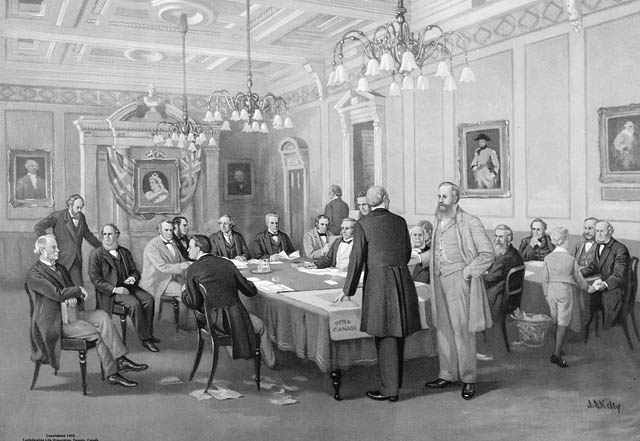
Delegates meeting in the Westminster Palace Hotel

The London Conference began on December 4, 1866 and ended on March 1867. It was a continuation of the Quebec Conference held in 1864, which had produced the Quebec Resolutions. The conference was held at the Westminster Palace Hotel, just across the street from the British Parliament buildings. John A. Macdonald was the chairman of the conference.

== Delegates ==
In 1866, the Province of Canada was composed of Canada East (now Quebec), and Canada West (now Ontario). The Province of Canada sent a total of six delegates, but for the purposes of the Conference, they were treated as two separate delegations.

=== Canada East ===
Canada East sent three delegates: George-Étienne Cartier, Alexander Tilloch Galt, and Hector-Louis Langevin.

=== Canada West ===
Canada West sent three delegates: William Pearce Howland, John A. Macdonald, and William McDougall.

=== New Brunswick ===
New Brunswick sent five delegates: Charles Fisher, John Mercer Johnson, Peter Mitchell, Samuel Leonard Tilley, and Robert Duncan Wilmot.

=== Nova Scotia ===
Nova Scotia sent five delegates: Adams George Archibald, William Alexander Henry, Jonathan McCully, John William Ritchie, and Charles Tupper.

== Major issues ==
=== Inter-colonial railway ===
One of the major issues when the Conference opened was the proposed Inter-Colonial Railway linking the Province of Canada to the Maritimes. This issue was quickly resolved when Macdonald stated that the Province of Canada agreed that the obligation to build the railway should be included in the legislation.

=== Structure of the Senate ===
The composition of the proposed Senate continued to be a major issue, with a suggestion from the British government that the Senate be elected, not appointed.

=== Denominational schools ===
A major issue of contention was the education system, with Roman Catholic bishops lobbying for guarantees protecting the separate school system. This was opposed by delegates from the Maritimes, and the compromise reached was Section 93 of the act, which guaranteed separate school systems in Quebec and Ontario but not in Nova Scotia or New Brunswick.

== See also ==
- Charlottetown Conference, 1864
- Quebec Conference, 1864
- Anti-Confederation Party
