= Quebec Resolutions =

Basis for the Constitution of Canada

The Quebec Resolutions, also known as the seventy-two resolutions, are a group of statements written at the Quebec Conference of 1864 which laid out the framework for the Canadian Constitution.

They were adopted by the majority of the provinces of British North America, and became the basis for the London Conference of 1866. Some of the major points that were addressed in the resolutions are as follows: Canada will have a strong central government (federal government), the central government is to be responsible for the legislation of peace, order and good government, provinces will have defined powers and will be accountable for handling local affairs and social and cultural issues, the Province of Canada will be split into Quebec and Ontario, a federal government will be composed of two law-making houses.
