= Tache =

Taché or variation, may refer to:

- tache, or mustache

== Places ==
- Rural Municipality of Taché, Manitoba, Canada
- Tache Avenue, Winnipeg, a street in Saint Boniface, Manitoba, Canada
- Boulevard Alexandre-Taché, a street in Gatineau, Quebec, Canada
- La Tâche, Charente, France
- La Tache, California, USA
- Le Tâche, a mountain in the Chablais Alps

== People ==
- Tache Papahagi (1892-1977) Ottoman-Romanian folklorist
- Tache Ionescu (1858-1922) Romanian politician
- Tache Gianni (1838-1902) Romanian politician

=== Surnamed ===
- Alexandre Taché (politician) (1899-1961), Canadian politician
- Alexandre-Antonin Taché (1823–1894), Canadian Catholic archbishop
- Aurélien Taché (born 1984) French politician
- Étienne-Paschal Taché (1795–1865), Canadian politician
- Eugène-Étienne Taché (1836-1912), Canadian engineer
- Jean Taché (1698-1768), French merchant
- Jean-Baptiste Taché (1786-1849), Canadian politician
- Joseph-Charles Taché (1820-1894), Canadian medical doctor
- Pascal Taché (1757-1830), Canadian merchant

== Other uses ==
- La Tâche AOC, a French wine controlled origin label

== See also ==
- Tache-Psyche Effect
- Sans Tache, motto of the Scottish Clan Napier
- Alexandre Taché (disambiguation)
- Tache noir (disambiguation)
