= Canadian Confederation =

1867 unification of British provinces

Canadian Confederation (French: Confédération canadienne) was the process by which three British North American provinces—the Province of Canada, Nova Scotia, and New Brunswick—were united into one federation, called the Dominion of Canada, on July 1, 1867. This process occurred with the rising tide of Canadian nationalism that was then beginning to swell within these provinces and others. It reached fruition through the British North America Act, 1867 (today known as the Constitution Act, 1867) which had been based on resolutions agreed to by colonial delegates in the 1864 Quebec Conference, later finalized in the 1866 London Conference.

Upon Confederation, Canada consisted of four provinces: Ontario and Quebec, which had been split out from the Province of Canada, and the provinces of Nova Scotia and New Brunswick. The province of Prince Edward Island, which had hosted the first meeting to consider Confederation, the Charlottetown Conference, did not join Confederation until 1873. Over the years since Confederation, Canada has seen numerous territorial changes and expansions, resulting in the current collection of ten provinces and three territories.

Political impasse in the Province of Canada and the loss of preferential access to U.S. markets after Washington cancelled the Canadian–American Reciprocity Treaty in 1866 sharpened the colonies' sense of economic vulnerability and motivated the desire for federal unification and market integration. The leaders of the Maritime colonies pressed for Ottawa's assumption of their public debts and for an intercolonial railway that would bind the trade of the St. Lawrence to an ice-free Atlantic port, while politicians across Canada West and Canada East saw federation as the only way to break legislative deadlock and finance large-scale infrastructure. At the same time, lingering fears of the U.S. concept of manifest destiny, memories of the Fenian raids, and Britain's desire to off-load defence costs persuaded many that a larger fiscal and military union offered the surest bulwark against American pressure and metropolitan indifference. The motto "peace, order, and good government" arose as an expression of a distinctly Canadian formulation of constitutional government in North America.

While historians have often portrayed Confederation as having emerged from pragmatic and administrative rationales, recent scholarship has uncovered a rich contest of ideas beneath the politicking, involving competing conceptions of order, power, liberty, rights, national development, and imperial autonomy. Confederation's legacy remains debated, celebrated as the moment Canada's people assumed control of its own development and started on the course to sovereignty, questioned for the limited place it left Indigenous peoples, and continually reinterpreted as constitutional debates over such things as the nature of Canadian federalism or the character of the founding compact reshape the understanding of its impact and significance.

== Terminology ==
=== Confederation ===
Canada is a federation, rather than a confederate association of sovereign states, which is what confederation means in contemporary political theory. The country, though, is often considered to be among the world's more decentralized federations. Use of the term confederation arose in the Province of Canada to refer to proposals beginning in the 1850s to federate all of the British North American colonies, as opposed to only Canada West (now Ontario) and Canada East (now Quebec). To contemporaries of Confederation, the con- prefix indicated a strengthening of the centrist principle compared to the American federation.

In this Canadian context, confederation describes the political process that united the colonies in 1867, events related to that process, and the subsequent incorporation of other colonies and territories. The word is now often used to describe Canada in an abstract way, such as in "the Fathers of Confederation"; provinces that became part of Canada after 1867 are also said to have joined, or entered into, Confederation (but not the Confederation). The term is also used to divide Canadian history into pre-Confederation and post-Confederation periods.

=== Fathers of Confederation ===
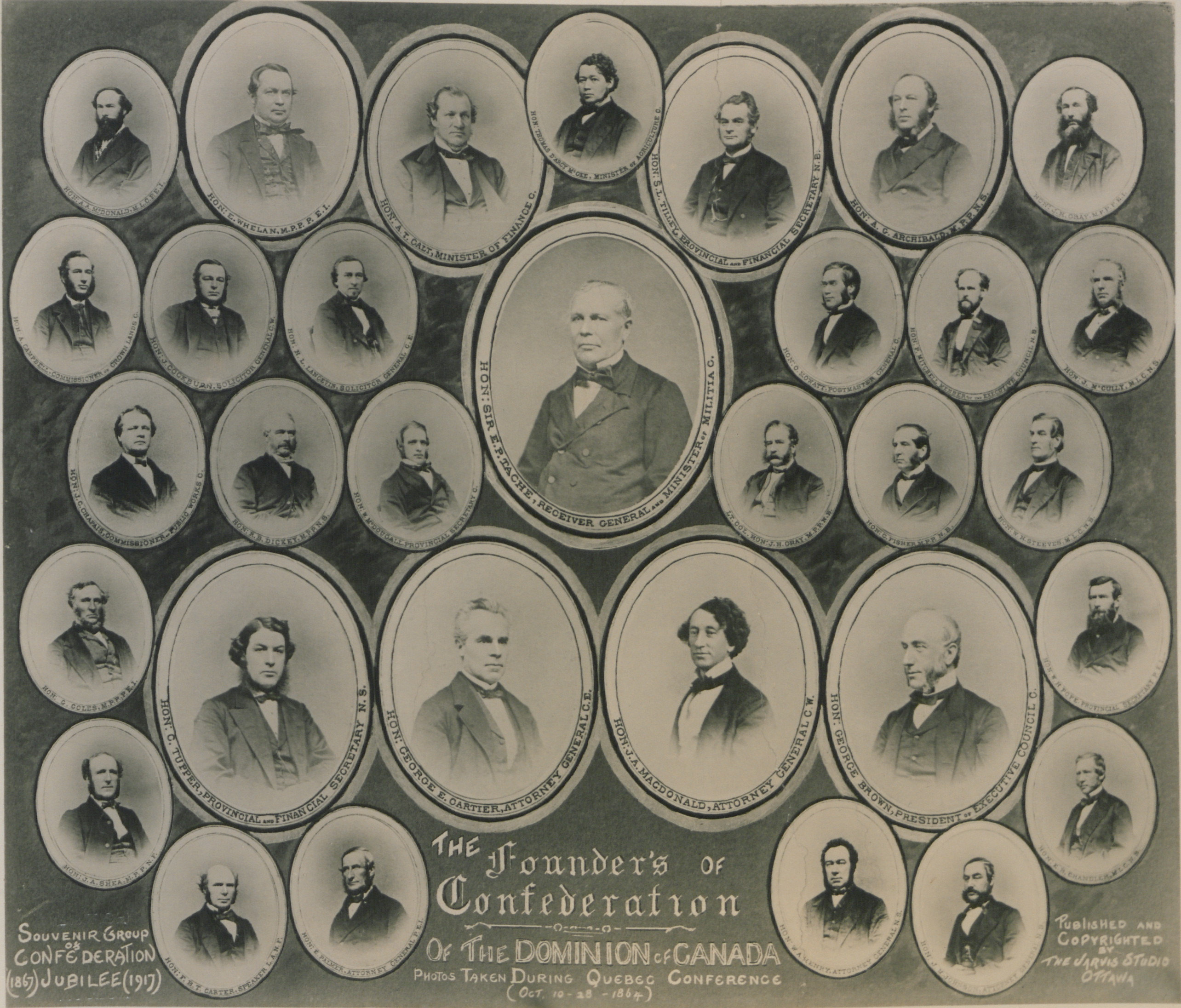
The Fathers of Confederation

The original Fathers of Confederation are those delegates who attended any of the conferences held at Charlottetown and Quebec in 1864 or in London, United Kingdom, in 1866, leading to Confederation. There were 36 original Fathers of Confederation; Hewitt Bernard, who was the recording secretary at the Charlottetown Conference, is considered by some to be among them.

The individuals who brought the other provinces into Confederation after 1867 are also referred to as Fathers of Confederation. In this way, Amor De Cosmos, who was instrumental both in bringing democracy to British Columbia and in bringing the province into Confederation, is considered to be a Father of Confederation. As well, Joey Smallwood referred to himself as "the Last Father of Confederation" because he helped lead Newfoundland into the union in 1949.

== History ==
=== Colonial organization ===
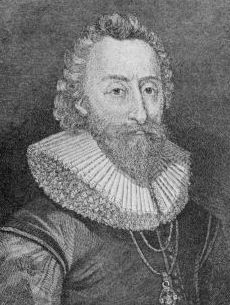
Sir William Alexander

All the former colonies and territories that became involved in the Canadian Confederation on July 1, 1867, were initially part of New France, and were once ruled by France. Nova Scotia was granted in 1621 to Sir William Alexander under charter by James I. This claim overlapped the French claims to Acadia, and although the Scottish colony of Nova Scotia was short-lived, for political reasons, the conflicting imperial interests of France and the 18th century Great Britain led to a long and bitter struggle for control. The British acquired present-day mainland Nova Scotia by the Treaty of Utrecht of 1713 and the Acadian population was expelled by the British in 1755. The rest of New France was acquired by the British as the result of its defeat of New France in the Seven Years' War, which ended with the Treaty of Paris in 1763. From 1763 to 1791, most of New France became the Province of Quebec. However, in 1769 the present-day Prince Edward Island, which had been part of Acadia, was renamed "St John's Island" and organized as a separate colony. It was renamed "Prince Edward Island" in 1798 in honour of Prince Edward, Duke of Kent and Strathearn.

The first English attempt at settlement on that part of the continent that would become modern Canada had been in Newfoundland which would not join Confederation until 1949. The Society of Merchant Venturers of Bristol began to settle Newfoundland and Labrador at Cuper's Cove as far back as 1610, and Newfoundland had also been the subject of a French colonial enterprise.

During and after the U.S. War of Independence, an estimated 50,000 United Empire Loyalists fled to British North America. The British created the separate province of New Brunswick in 1784 for Loyalists who settled in the western part of Nova Scotia. Nova Scotia (including New Brunswick) received slightly more than half of this influx, and many Loyalists settled in the province of Quebec, which later by the Constitutional Act 1791 was separated into a predominantly English Upper Canada and a predominantly French Lower Canada. The War of 1812 and Treaty of 1818 established the border between British North America and the United States at the 49th parallel from the Great Lakes to the Rocky Mountains in Western Canada.

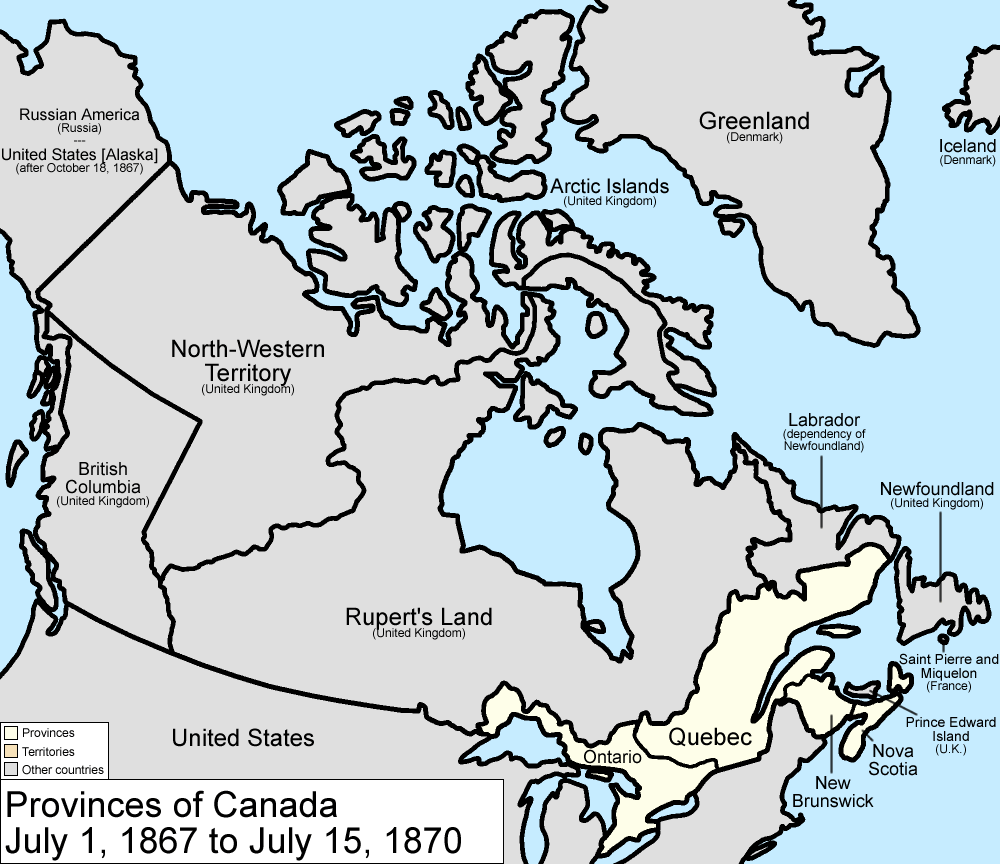
Canadian territory at Confederation

Following the Rebellions of 1837, Lord Durham in his Durham Report, recommended Upper and Lower Canada be joined as the Province of Canada and the new province should have a responsible government. As a result of Durham's report, the British Parliament passed the Act of Union 1840, and the Province of Canada was formed in 1841. The new province had two parts: Canada West (the former Upper Canada, today's Ontario) and Canada East (the former Lower Canada, today's Quebec). Governor General Lord Elgin granted ministerial responsibility in 1848, first to Nova Scotia and then to the Province of Canada. Later, the British parliament extended responsible government to Prince Edward Island (1851), New Brunswick (1854), and Newfoundland (1855).

The area constituting modern-day British Columbia is the remnants of the Hudson's Bay Company's Columbia District and New Caledonia District following the Oregon Treaty. Before joining Canada in 1871, British Columbia consisted of the separate Colony of British Columbia (formed in 1858, in an area where the Crown had granted a monopoly to the Hudson's Bay Company), and the Colony of Vancouver Island (formed in 1849) constituting a separate crown colony until it was united with the colony of British Columbia in 1866.

The remainder of modern-day Canada was made up of Rupert's Land and the North-Western Territory (both of which were controlled by the Hudson's Bay Company and sold to Canada in 1870) and the Arctic Islands, which were under direct British control and became a part of Canada in 1880. Plus, Newfoundland and Labrador joined Canada in 1949.

=== Early attempts ===
The idea of joining the various colonies in North America was being floated as early as 1814. That year, Chief Justice of Lower Canada Jonathan Sewell sent a copy of his report, A Plan for the federal Union of British Provinces in North America, to Prince Edward (both a son of King George III and the father of Queen Victoria), whom Sewell had befriended when they both resided in Quebec City. Edward replied, "nothing can be better arranged than the whole thing is, or more perfectly", going on to suggest a unified Canada consisting of two provinces—one formed from Upper and Lower Canada and the other from the Maritime colonies—each with a lieutenant governor and executive council, one located in Montreal and the other in either Annapolis Royal or Windsor. Edward said he would pass the report on to the Earl Bathurst, the then-Secretary of State for War and the Colonies; the Prince's comments and critiques were later cited by both the Earl of Durham and participants of the Charlottetown and Quebec Conferences.

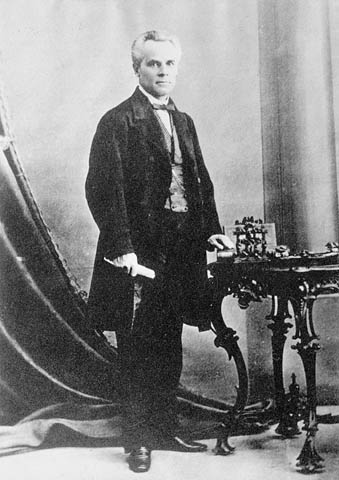
George-Étienne Cartier

Lord Durham presented his idea of unification in 1839 Report on the Affairs of British North America, which resulted in the Act of Union 1840. Beginning in 1857, Joseph-Charles Taché proposed a federation in a series of 33 articles published in the Courrier du Canada. Two years later, Alexander Tilloch Galt, George-Étienne Cartier, and John Ross travelled to the United Kingdom to present the British Parliament with a project for confederation of the British colonies. The proposal was received by the London authorities with polite indifference.

The royal tour of British North America undertaken by Queen Victoria's son, Prince Albert Edward (later King Edward VII) in 1860, however, helped lead to the unification of the colonies by confirming a common bond between their inhabitants; indeed, the monarchy played a "pivotal legal and symbolic role [...] in cementing the new Canadian union". Further, by 1864, it was clear that continued governance of the Province of Canada under the terms of the 1840 Act of Union had become impracticable. Therefore, a grand coalition of parties, the Great Coalition, formed in order to reform the political system. Queen Victoria remarked on "the impossibility of our being able to hold Canada; but, we must struggle for it; and by far the best solution would be to let it go as an independent kingdom under an English prince."

=== Influences leading to Confederation ===
Several factors influenced Confederation, caused both by internal sources and pressures from external sources.

Internally, there was political deadlock resulting from the contemporary governmental structure in the Province of Canada and distrust between English Protestants and French Catholics. Further, demographic pressure from an expanding population and economic nationalism wanting economic development butted against a lack of an inter-colonial railroad, which hampered trade, military movement, and transportation in general.

Externally, the Canadian–American Reciprocity Treaty (a free trade policy, starting in 1854, whereby products were allowed into the United States without taxes or tariffs, which was then considered to be beneficial for Canada) was cancelled by the United States in 1865, partly as revenge against Britain for unofficial support of the south in the American Civil War. Additionally, the U.S. doctrine of "manifest destiny" raised fears of another American invasion (Canadians had fended off American incursions during the Revolutionary War, War of 1812, Fenian raids, and St. Albans Raid), only further inflamed by the Alaska Purchase of March 30, 1867, which had been supported in the U.S. Senate (by Charles Sumner among others) precisely in terms of taking the remainder of North America from the British. The American Civil War had also horrified Canadians and turned many from the thought of republicanism. In Britain, political pressure came from financiers who had lost money by investing in the failed Grand Trunk Railway and the little Englander philosophy fed a desire to withdraw troops from Britain's colonies.

=== Ideological origins and philosophical dimensions ===
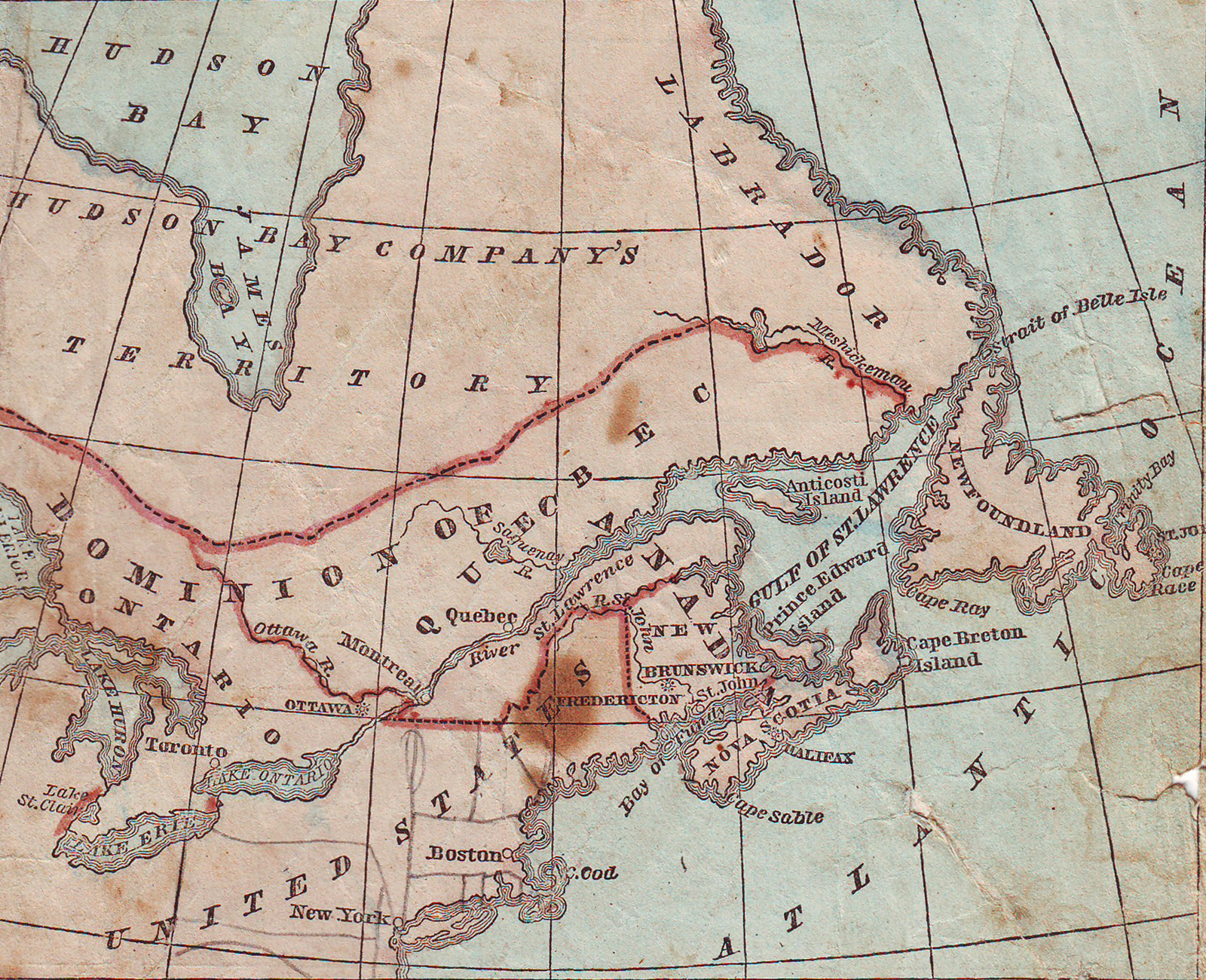
Map of the Eastern British Provinces in North America at the time of Canadian Confederation, 1867

There is extensive scholarly debate on the role of political ideas in Canadian Confederation. Traditionally, historians regarded Canadian Confederation an exercise in political pragmatism that was essentially non-ideological. In the 1960s, historian Peter Waite derided the references to political philosophers in the legislative debates on Confederation as "hot air". In Waite's view, Confederation was driven by pragmatic brokerage politics and competing interest groups.

In 1987, political scientist Peter J. Smith challenged the view Canadian Confederation was non-ideological. Smith argued Confederation was motivated by new political ideologies as much as the American and French Revolutions and Canadian Confederation was driven by a Court Party ideology. Smith traces the origins of this ideology to eighteenth and nineteenth-century Britain, where political life was polarized between defenders of classical republican values of the Country Party and proponents of a new pro-capitalist ideology of the Court Party, which believed in centralizing political power. In British North America in the late 1860s, the Court Party tradition was represented by the supporters of Confederation, whereas the anti-capitalist and agrarian Country Party tradition was embodied by the Anti-Confederates.

In a 2000 journal article, historian Ian McKay argued Canadian Confederation was motivated by the ideology of liberalism and the belief in the supremacy of individual rights. McKay described Confederation as part of the classical liberal project of creating a "liberal order" in northern North America. Many Canadian historians have adopted McKay's liberal order framework as a paradigm for understanding Canadian history.

In 2008, historian Andrew Smith advanced a very different view of Confederation's ideological origins. He argues that in the four original Canadian provinces, the politics of taxation were a central issue in the debate about Confederation. Taxation was also central to the debate in Newfoundland, the tax-averse colony that rejected it. Smith argued Confederation was supported by many colonists who were sympathetic to a relatively interventionist, or statist, approach to capitalist development. Most classical liberals, who believed in free trade and low taxes, opposed Confederation because they feared it would result in Big Government. The struggle over Confederation involved a battle between a staunch individualist economic philosophy and a comparatively collectivist view of the state's proper role in the economy. According to Smith, the victory of the statist supporters of Confederation over their anti-statist opponents prepared the way for John A. Macdonald's government to enact the protectionist National Policy and to subsidize major infrastructure projects such as the Intercolonial and Pacific Railways.

In 2007, political scientist Janet Ajzenstat connected Canadian Confederation to the individualist ideology of John Locke. She argued that the union of the British North American colonies was motivated by a desire to protect individual rights, especially the rights to life, liberty, and property. She contends the Fathers of Confederation were motivated by the values of the Enlightenment of the seventeenth and eighteenth centuries. She argues their intellectual debts to Locke are most evident when one looks at the 1865 debates in the Province of Canada's legislature on whether or not union with the other British North American colonies would be desirable.

=== Charlottetown Conference ===
In the spring of 1864, New Brunswick premier Samuel Leonard Tilley, Nova Scotia premier Charles Tupper, and Prince Edward Island premier John Hamilton Gray were contemplating the idea of a Maritime Union which would join their three colonies together.

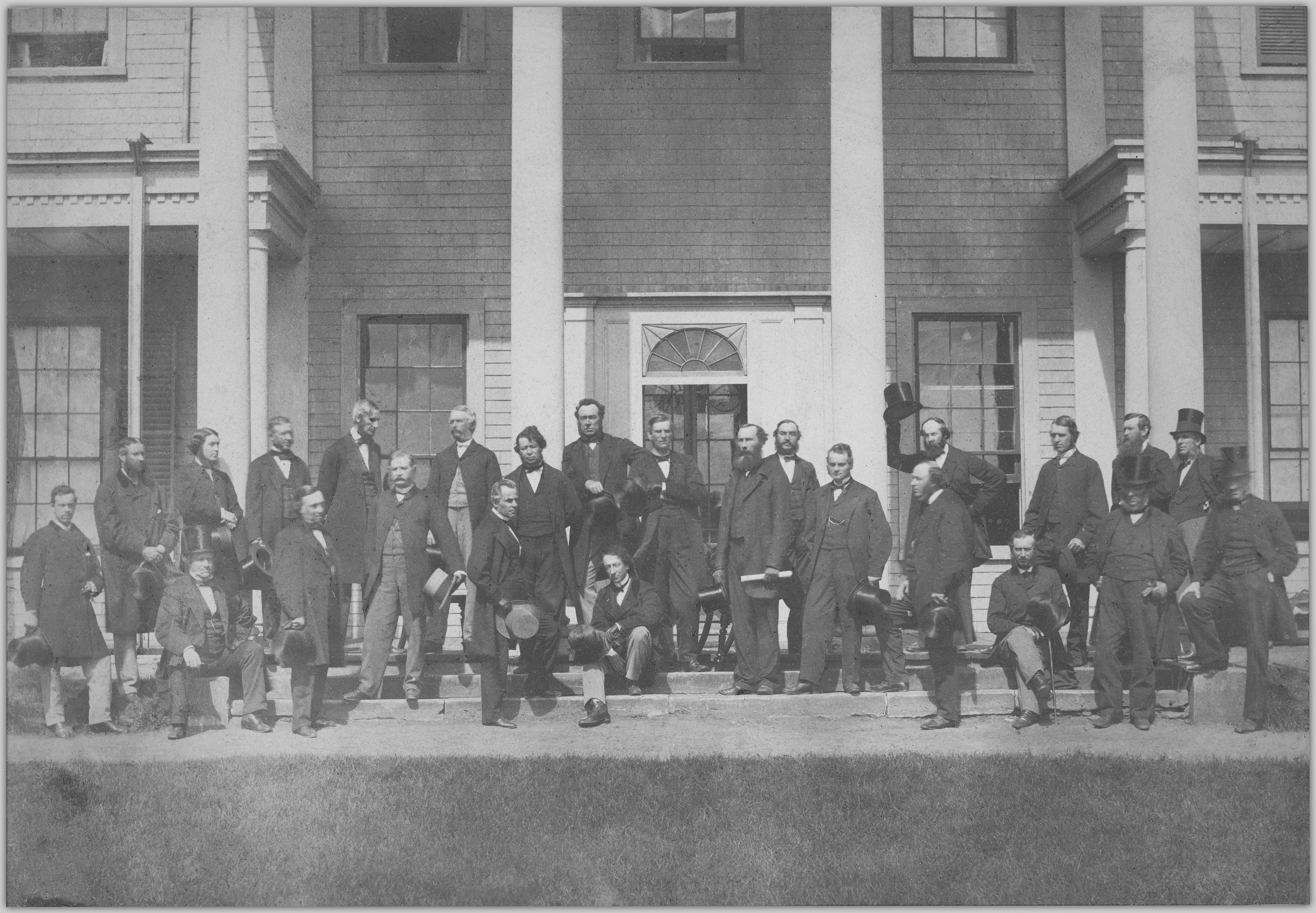
Delegates of the Charlottetown Conference on the steps of Government House, September 1864

The government of the Province of Canada surprised the Maritime governments by asking if the Province of Canada could be included in the negotiations. The request was channelled through the governor general, Monck, to London and accepted by the Colonial Office. After several years of legislative paralysis in the Province of Canada caused by the need to maintain a double legislative majority (a majority of both the Canada East and Canada West delegates in the Province of Canada's legislature), Macdonald had led his Liberal-Conservative Party into the Great Coalition with Cartier's Parti bleu and George Brown's Clear Grits. Macdonald, Cartier, and Brown felt union with the other British colonies might be a way to solve the political problems of the Province of Canada.

The Charlottetown Conference began on September 1, 1864. Since the agenda for the meeting had already been set, the delegation from the Province of Canada was initially not an official part of the Conference. The issue of Maritime Union was deferred and the Canadians were formally allowed to join and address the Conference.

No minutes from the Charlottetown Conference survive, but it is known Cartier and Macdonald presented arguments in favour of a union of the three colonies, Alexander Tilloch Galt presented the Province of Canada's proposals on the financial arrangements of such a union, and George Brown presented a proposal for what form a united government might take. The Canadian delegation's proposal for the governmental system involved:

1. preservation of ties with Great Britain
2. residual jurisdiction left to a central authority
3. a bicameral system including a Lower House with representation by population (rep by pop) and an Upper House with representation based on regional, rather than provincial, equality
4. responsible government at the federal and provincial levels
5. the appointment of a Canadian governor general by the British Crown

Other proposals attractive to the politicians from the Maritime colonies were:

1. assumption of provincial debt by the central government
2. revenues from the central government apportioned to the provinces on the basis of population
3. the building of an intercolonial railway to link Montreal and Halifax, giving Canada access to an ice-free winter port and the Maritimes easy access to Canada and Rupert's Land

By September 7, 1864, the delegates from Nova Scotia, New Brunswick and Prince Edward Island gave a positive answer to the Canadian delegation, expressing the view the federation of all of the provinces was considered desirable if the terms of union could be made satisfactory and the question of Maritime Union was waived.

After the Conference adjourned on September 9, there were further meetings between delegates held at Halifax, Saint John, and Fredericton. These meetings evinced enough interest that the delegates decided to hold a second Conference.

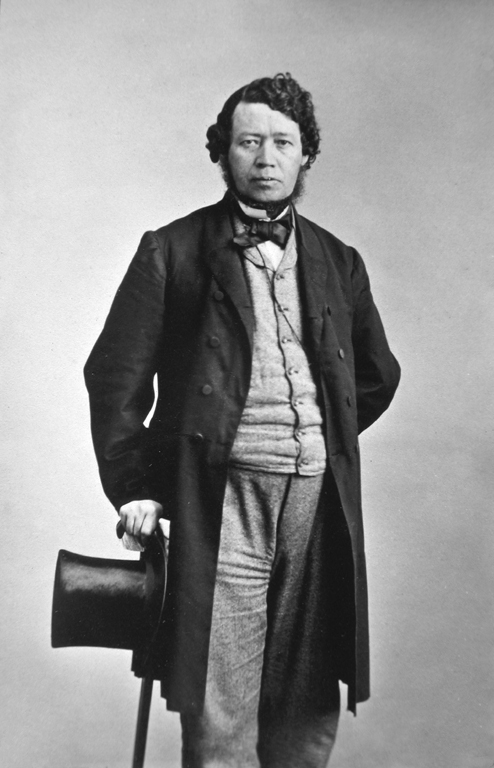
Thomas D'Arcy McGee in 1868

==== Delegates' reactions ====
One of the most important purposes of the Charlottetown Conference was the introduction of Canadians to the leaders from the Maritime Provinces and vice versa. At this point, there was no railway link from Quebec City to Halifax, and the people of each region had little to do with one another. Thomas D'Arcy McGee was one of the few Canadian delegates who had been to the Maritimes, when he had gone down earlier that summer with a trade mission of Canadian businessmen, journalists and politicians.

George Brown remarked in a letter to his wife Anne that at a party given by the premier of PEI, Colonel John Hamilton Gray, he met a woman who had never been off the island in her entire life. Nevertheless, he found Prince Edward Islanders to be "amazingly civilized".

==== Press and popular reaction ====
Reaction to the Charlottetown Conference varied among the different newspapers. In the Maritimes, there was concern that the smooth Canadians with their sparkling champagne and charming speeches were outsmarting the delegates of the smaller provinces. "From all accounts it looks as if these [Canadian] gentlemen had it all their own way; ... and that, what with their arguments and what with their blandishments, (they gave a champagne lunch on board the Victoria where Mr. McGee's wit sparkled brightly as the wine), they carried the Lower Province delegates a little off their feet."

The delegates from the Quebec conference considered if the resolutions would be better suited for acceptance if a popular vote were held on them. However, due to the divide amongst religious groups and general mistrust between areas in Canada, they believed that such a vote would be defeated. Thus, they went ahead with the resolutions on their own volition.

=== Quebec Conference ===
After returning home from the Charlottetown Conference, Macdonald asked Viscount Monck, the governor general of the Province of Canada to invite delegates from the three Maritime provinces and Newfoundland to a conference with United Canada delegates. At the opening of the conference, a total of 33 delegates were included from the British North American Colonies, including Newfoundland, which had not participated in prior meetings. Monck obliged and the Conference went ahead at Quebec City in October 1864.

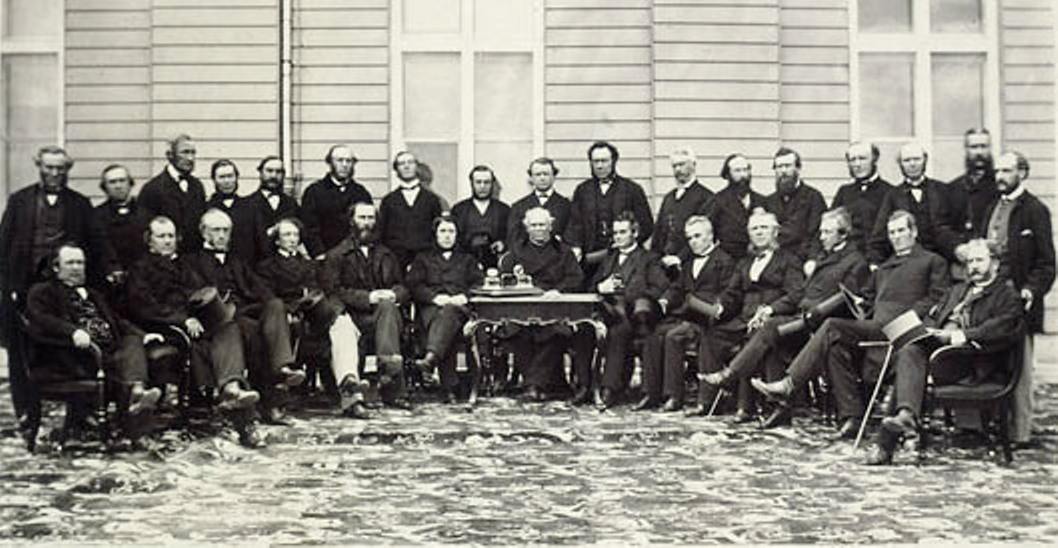
Delegates at the Quebec Conference, October 1864

The Conference began on October 10, 1864, on the site of present-day Montmorency Park. The Conference elected Étienne-Paschal Taché as its chairman, but it was dominated by Macdonald. Despite differences in the positions of some of the delegates on some issues, the Quebec Conference, following so swiftly on the success of the Charlottetown Conference, was infused with a determinative sense of purpose and nationalism. For the Reformers of Canada West, led by George Brown, the end of what they perceived as French-Canadian interference in local affairs was in sight. For Maritimers such as Tupper of Nova Scotia or Tilley of New Brunswick, horizons were suddenly broadened to take in much larger possibilities for trade and growth.

On the issue of the Senate, the Maritime Provinces pressed for as much equality as possible. With the addition of Newfoundland to the Conference, the three Maritime colonies did not wish to see the strength of their provinces in the upper chamber diluted by simply adding Newfoundland to the Atlantic category. It was the matter of the Senate that threatened to derail the entire proceedings. It was Macdonald who came up with the acceptable compromise of giving Newfoundland four senators of its own when it joined.

The delegates from the Maritimes also raised an issue with respect to the level of government—federal or provincial—that would be given the powers not otherwise specifically defined. Macdonald, who was aiming for the strongest central government possible, insisted this was to be the central government, and in this, he was supported by, among others, Tupper.

At the end of the Conference, it adopted the "seventy-two resolutions" which would form the basis of a scheduled future conference. The Conference adjourned on October 27.

Prince Edward Island emerged disappointed from the Quebec Conference. It did not receive support for a guarantee of six members in the proposed House of Commons, and was denied an appropriation of $200,000 it felt had been offered at Charlottetown to assist in buying out the holdings of absentee landlords.

==== Press and popular reaction ====
"Never was there such an opportunity as now for the birth of a nation" proclaimed a pamphlet written by S. E. Dawson and reprinted in a Quebec City newspaper during the Conference.

Again, reaction to the Quebec Conference varied depending on the political views of the critic.

==== Constitutional scheme discussed in London ====
George Brown was the first, in December 1864, to carry the constitutional proposals to the British government in London, where Brown received "a most gracious answer to our constitutional scheme". He also met with William Gladstone—who was then Chancellor of the Exchequer and, later, Prime Minister—"who agreed in almost everything". In April 1865, Brown, Macdonald, Cartier and Galt met with the government and found "the project of a federal union of the colonies was highly approved of by the imperial authorities".

On the form of the proposed system of governance for Canada, the Fathers of Confederation were influenced by the American republic. Macdonald said in 1865:

By adhering to the monarchical principle, we avoid one defect inherent in the constitution of the United States. By the election of the president by a majority and for a short period, he never is the sovereign and chief of the nation. He is never looked up to by the whole people as the head and front of the nation. He is, at best, but the successful leader of a party. This defect is all the greater on account of the practice of reelection. During his first term of office, he is employed in taking steps to secure his own reelection and, for his party, a continuance of power. We avoid this by adhering to the monarchical principle—the sovereign, whom you respect and love. I believe that it is of the utmost importance to have that principle recognized so that we shall have a sovereign who is placed above the region of party—to whom all parties look up; who is not elevated by the action of one party nor depressed by the action of another; who is the common head and sovereign of all.

=== London Conference ===
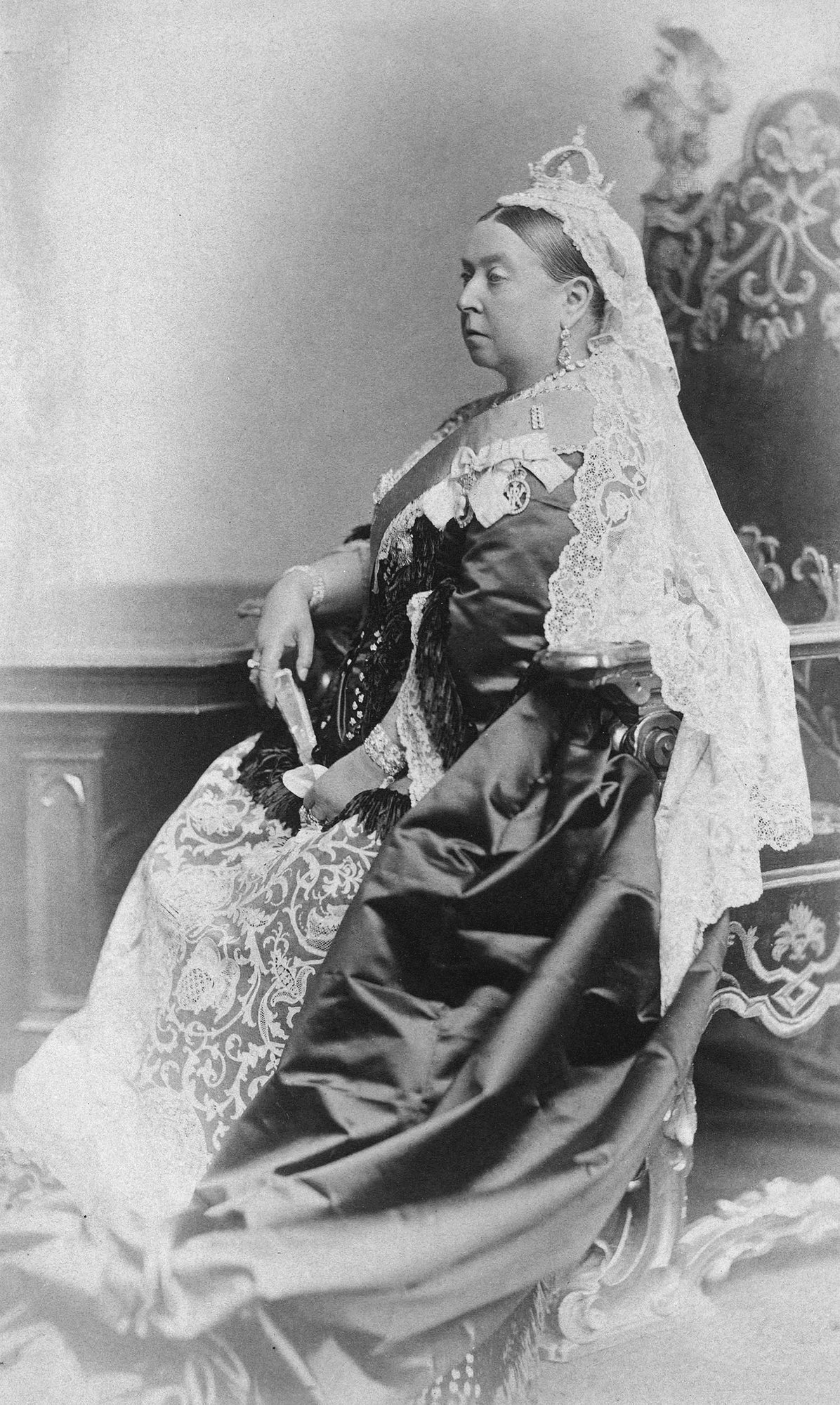
Queen Victoria granted royal assent to the British North America Act on March 29, 1867

Following the Quebec Conference, the Province of Canada's legislature passed a bill approving the union. The union proved more controversial in the Maritime provinces, however, and it was not until 1866 that New Brunswick and Nova Scotia passed union resolutions, while Prince Edward Island and Newfoundland continued to opt against joining.

In December 1866, sixteen delegates from the Province of Canada, New Brunswick, and Nova Scotia travelled to London, where the Earl of Carnarvon presented each to Queen Victoria in private audience, as well as holding court for their wives and daughters. To the Nova Scotian delegates, the Queen said, "I take the deepest interest in [Confederation], for I believe it will make [the provinces] great and prosperous."

At meetings held at the Westminster Palace Hotel, the delegates reviewed and approved the 72 resolutions; although Charles Tupper had promised to anti-union forces in Nova Scotia that he would push for amendments, he was unsuccessful in getting any passed. Now known as the London Resolutions, the conference's decisions were forwarded to the Colonial Office.

After breaking for Christmas, the delegates reconvened in January 1867 and began drafting the British North America Act. The 4th Earl of Carnarvon continued to have a central role in drafting the act at Highclere Castle alongside the first prime minister of Canada Macdonald, Cartier and Galt, who signed the visitor book in 1866. After suggestions of 'Franklin' and 'Guelfenland', they agreed the new country should be called Canada, Canada East should be renamed Quebec and Canada West should be renamed Ontario. There was, however, heated debate about how the new country should be designated. Ultimately, the delegates elected to call the new country the Dominion of Canada, after "kingdom" and "confederation", among other options, were rejected. The term dominion was allegedly suggested by Sir Samuel Leonard Tilley.

The delegates had completed their draft of the British North America Act by February 1867. The act was presented to Queen Victoria on February 11, 1867. The bill was introduced in the House of Lords the next day. The bill was quickly approved by the House of Lords, and then also quickly approved by the British House of Commons. (The Conservative Lord Derby was prime minister of the United Kingdom at the time.) The act received royal assent on March 29, 1867, and set July 1, 1867, as the date for union.

=== British North America Acts ===
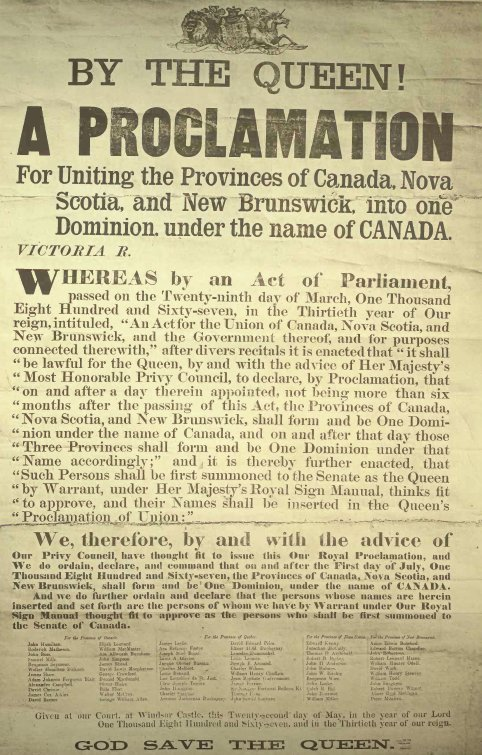
The proclamation of Canadian Confederation

Confederation was accomplished when the Queen gave royal assent to the British North America Act (BNA Act) on March 29, 1867, followed by a royal proclamation stating, "we do ordain, declare, and command that, on and after the first day of July, one thousand eight hundred and sixty-seven, the provinces of Canada, Nova Scotia, and New Brunswick shall form and be One Dominion, under the name of Canada." The act replaced the Act of Union 1840, which had unified Upper Canada and Lower Canada into the united Province of Canada; separate provinces were established under their current names of Ontario and Quebec, respectively. July 1 is now celebrated as Canada Day, the country's official national day.

Confederation is regarded as the creation of a kingdom in its own right and to have "successfully reconciled the physical absence of a geographically distant monarch with a continuing and pervasive presence through the medium of formal representatives and the manner and forms of legal and conventional rules and behaviour associated with British parliamentary and monarchical governance". Macdonald had spoken of "founding a great British monarchy" and wanted the newly created country to be called the Kingdom of Canada, as suggested in the Canadian draft. The Colonial Office opposed the term kingdom as "premature" and "pretentious" and felt it might antagonize the United States. The term dominion was chosen, instead, to indicate Canada's status as a self-governing polity of the British Empire, the first time it was used in reference to a country. When the British North America Act, 1867, was passed in the Parliament in Westminster, the Queen said to Macdonald, "I am very glad to see you on this mission [...] It is a very important measure and you have all exhibited so much loyalty."

While the BNA Act eventually resulted in Canada having more autonomy than it had before, the country was still far from fully independent of the United Kingdom. Foreign policy remained in British hands, the Judicial Committee of the Privy Council remained Canada's highest court of appeal, and the constitution could be amended only in Britain. Gradually, Canada gained more autonomy; defence of British North America became a Canadian responsibility. According to the Supreme Court of Canada, Canadian "sovereignty was acquired in the period between its separate signature of the Treaty of Versailles in 1919 and the Statute of Westminster, 1931", which gave the country nearly full independence. It was only because the federal and provincial governments were unable to agree on a formula for amending the constitution that the power to do so remained with the British Parliament. Once that issue was resolved, the constitution was patriated when Elizabeth II gave royal assent to the Canada Act, 1982.

The constitution of Canada is made up of a number of codified acts and uncodified conventions; one of the principal documents is the Constitution Act, 1982, which renamed the British North America Act, 1867, to the Constitution Act, 1867. The act also details how power is distributed in both the provincial and federal jurisdictions. Two of the most important sections are 91 and 92. Section 91 gives Parliament jurisdiction over banking, interest rates, criminal law, the postal system, and the armed forces. Section 92 gives the provinces jurisdiction over property, contracts and torts, local works, and general business. Still, federal and provincial law may occasionally interfere with each other, in which case federal law prevails.

=== Results ===
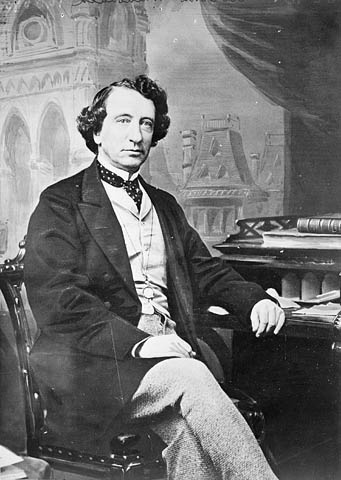
John A. Macdonald became the first prime minister of Canada.

Dominion elections were held in August and September, 1867, to elect the first Parliament. The governments of the Province of Canada, Nova Scotia and New Brunswick nominated the seventy-two individuals who would be named to the Senate, who were listed in the proclamation of Confederation (twenty-four each for Quebec and Ontario, twelve each for New Brunswick and Nova Scotia). They were called to the Senate by the governor general for the opening of the first Parliament.

The Anti-Confederation Party won 18 out of 19 federal Nova Scotia seats in September 1867, and in the Nova Scotia provincial election of 1868, 36 out of 38 seats in the legislature. For seven years, William Annand and Joseph Howe led the ultimately unsuccessful fight to convince British imperial authorities to release Nova Scotia from Confederation. The government was vocally against Confederation, contending it was no more than the annexation of the province to the pre-existing province of Canada.

Prior to the coming into effect of the Constitution Act, 1867, there had been some concern regarding a potential "legislative vacuum" that would occur over the 15-month period between the prorogation of the Province of Canada's final Parliament in August 1866 and the opening of the now Dominion of Canada's first Parliament in November 1867. To prevent this, the Constitution Act, 1867, provided for "continuance of existing laws" from the three colonies of Canada, Nova Scotia, and New Brunswick until new laws could be established in the Dominion. Thus, the "Dominion's financial systems, structures and actors were able to operate under the provisions of the old Province of Canada Acts" following confederation, and many institutions and organizations were continued and assumed "the same responsibilities for the new federal government that it had held as a provincial organization".

== Joining Confederation ==
After the initial BNA Act in 1867, Manitoba was established by an act of the Canadian Parliament on July 15, 1870, originally as an area of land much smaller than the current province. British Columbia joined Canada July 20, 1871, by an Imperial order-in-council enacted under the authority of the British North America Act. The order-in-council incorporated the Terms of Union negotiated by the governments of Canada and British Columbia, including a commitment by the federal government to build a railway connecting British Columbia to the railway system of Canada within 10 years of union. Prince Edward Island (PEI) joined July 1, 1873, also by an Imperial order-in-council. One reason for joining was financial: PEI's economy was performing poorly and union would bring monetary benefits that would assist the province in avoiding bankruptcy. One of the Prince Edward Island Terms of Union was a guarantee by the federal government to operate a ferry link, a term deleted upon completion of the Confederation Bridge in 1997. Alberta and Saskatchewan were established September 1, 1905, by acts of the Canadian Parliament. Newfoundland joined on March 31, 1949, by an act of the Imperial Parliament, also with a ferry link guaranteed.

The Crown acquired Rupert's Land and the North-Western Territory from the Hudson's Bay Company in 1869 (though final payment to the Hudson's Bay Company did not occur until 1870), and then transferred jurisdiction to the Dominion on July 15, 1870, merging them and naming them North-West Territories. In 1880, the British assigned all North American Arctic islands to Canada, right up to Ellesmere Island. From this vast swath of territory were created three provinces (Manitoba, Saskatchewan, Alberta) and two territories (Yukon Territory and North-West Territories, now Yukon and Northwest Territories), and two extensions each to Quebec, Ontario, and Manitoba. Later, the third territory of Nunavut was carved from the Northwest Territories on April 1, 1999. The Yukon territory was formed during the Klondike gold rush. People from all around Canada and the United States flocked to the area due to rumours of an easy way to get rich. The Canadian government sought to regulate this migration and tax gold findings, whether American or Canadian.

Below is a list of Canadian provinces and territories in the order in which they entered Confederation; territories are italicized. At formal events, representatives of the provinces and territories take precedence according to this ordering, except that provinces always precede territories. For provinces that entered on the same date, the order of precedence is based on the provinces' populations at the time they entered Confederation.

Date	Name	Previously
July 1, 1867	Ontario	Canada West region of the Province of Canada (Note: Later received additional land from the Northwest Territories.)
July 1, 1867	Quebec	Canada East region of the Province of Canada
July 1, 1867	Nova Scotia	Province of Nova Scotia
July 1, 1867	New Brunswick	Province of New Brunswick
July 15, 1870	Manitoba	Part of Rupert's Land (Note: In 1870 the Hudson's Bay Company–controlled Rupert's Land and North-Western Territory were transferred to the Dominion of Canada. Most of these lands were formed into a new territory named North-West Territories, but the region around Fort Garry was simultaneously established as the province of Manitoba by the Manitoba Act of 1870.)
July 15, 1870	Northwest Territories (North-West Territories)	All of Rupert's Land and the North-Western Territory except for the part which became Manitoba
July 20, 1871	British Columbia	United Colony of British Columbia
July 1, 1873	Prince Edward Island	Colony of Prince Edward Island
June 13, 1898	Yukon Territory (Note: Renamed Yukon in 2003.)	Part of the North-West Territories
September 1, 1905	Saskatchewan	Part of the North-West Territories
September 1, 1905	Alberta	Part of the North-West Territories
March 31, 1949	Newfoundland (Note: Renamed Newfoundland and Labrador in 2001.)	Dominion of Newfoundland
April 1, 1999	Nunavut	Part of the Northwest Territories

== Legacy ==
The term confederation has entered into Canadian parlance both as a metaphor for the country and for the historical events that created it. It has therefore become one of the most common names for Canadian landmarks. Examples include Mount Confederation, Confederation Square, the Confederation Building, Confederation Park, Confederation Station, Confederation Heights, Confederation Bridge, and so on. This is similar to the American practices of naming things union and likewise the Australians with federation.

Indigenous communities were ignored in the process of Canadian confederation. As a result of Confederation, the Parliament and government of Canada assumed the responsibilities of their British counterparts in treaty dealings with the First Nations. The federal Parliament subsequently passed the Indian Act in 1876, which, in amended form, continues to govern Indigenous peoples. Confederation created conditions of colonialism, including resource grabbing, broken treaties, forced assimilation, patriarchy, and intergenerational trauma inflicted by the hegemony of the Canadian state on Indigenous nations that had been self-governing.

As the 20th century progressed, attention to the conditions of Indigenous peoples in Canada increased, which included the granting of full voting rights in 1960. Treaty rights were enshrined in the Canadian constitution in 1982 and, in Sparrow v. The Queen, the Supreme Court determined there exists a fiduciary affiliation between the Canadian Crown and Indigenous peoples in which the Crown is constitutionally charged with providing certain guarantees to the First Nations. Recognizing the principle of aboriginal title, a process of land claims settlements is ongoing. Created to resolve the effects of the residential school system, a Truth and Reconciliation Commission was struck to identify further measures to improve conditions.

== Confederation timeline ==
Confederation timeline: 1863 to 1867
1863 to 1864
Date	Event	Result
July–September 1863	Lieutenant Governor Gordon encourages Maritime union	Arthur Gordon, newly appointed British lieutenant governor of New Brunswick, encourages Samuel Leonard Tilley, premier of New Brunswick, and Charles Tupper, premier of Nova Scotia, to consider the possibility of a union of the three Maritime provinces: New Brunswick, Nova Scotia, and Prince Edward Island
March 28, 1864	Nova Scotia resolution for Maritime union conference	Premier Tupper introduces resolution in Nova Scotia House of Assembly to appoint delegates to a conference of the three Maritime provinces to consider the possibility of Maritime union; union only to occur if approved by statutes passed by each of the three provinces and the Queen; resolution passes with all-party support
April 9, 1864	New Brunswick resolution for Maritime union conference	Premier Tilley introduces resolution in New Brunswick House of Assembly to appoint delegates to a conference of the three Maritime provinces to consider the possibility of Maritime union; union only to occur if approved by statutes passed by each of the three provinces and the Queen; resolution passes with all-party support
April 18, 1864	Prince Edward Island resolution for Maritime union conference	John Hamilton Gray, premier of Prince Edward Island, introduces resolution in Legislative Assembly of Prince Edward Island to appoint delegates to a conference of the three Maritime provinces to consider the possibility of Maritime union; no further action to be taken until report of the Conference be laid before the Prince Edward Island Legislative Assembly; resolution passes on party lines
June 14, 1864	Report on constitutional reform in Province of Canada	George Brown, member of the Legislative Assembly of the Province of Canada, presents committee report addressing flaws in the constitutional system of the Province of Canada; report favours a federal system of government, either for the two sections of the Province of Canada alone, or for a union of the British North American provinces
June 14, 1864	Government of the Province of Canada falls	The same day Brown presents the report, the government falls on a non-confidence motion; stark illustration of the political instability of the Province of Canada; second government to fall in 1864, after only two and a half months in office
June 14–16, 1864	Brown initiates discussions with John A. Macdonald	Political overtures by Brown to John A. Macdonald, George-Étienne Cartier and Alexander T. Galt to seek constitutional changes; Macdonald responds; Brown favours federal constitution for Province of Canada; Macdonald, Cartier and Galt propose seeking union of all eastern British North American provinces
June 17–30, 1864	Great Coalition formed	Coalition government of Liberal-Conservatives from Canada West (led by Macdonald); Reformers from Canada West (led by Brown); Bleus from Canada East (led by Cartier); and Liberal-Conservatives from Canada East (led by Galt); Coalition agrees to pursue union of eastern British North American provinces; failing that, will seek a federal constitution for the Province of Canada
June 30, 1864	Canadians ask to attend conference on Maritime Union	Governor General Monck sends letters to the Maritime lieutenant governors, requesting that the Province of Canada be permitted to send a delegation to the upcoming conference on Maritime union
September 1–9, 1864	Charlottetown Conference, Charlottetown, Prince Edward Island	Meeting of delegates from Province of Canada, Nova Scotia, New Brunswick and Prince Edward Island; no real discussion of Maritime union; Province of Canada proposal for a union of the British North American provinces gains general support; Conference delegates agree to continue discussions at Quebec; Maritime Union shelved
October 10–27, 1864	Quebec Conference, Quebec City, Province of Canada	Delegates from Province of Canada, Nova Scotia, New Brunswick, Prince Edward Island and Newfoundland meet in Quebec to discuss the Confederation proposal in more detail; Conference passes the Quebec Resolutions, which outline a detailed proposal for Confederation of the British North American provinces
October 19, 1864	St. Albans Raid	Group of Confederate soldiers travel to Canada and conduct a cross-border raid to St. Albans, Vermont; captured by Canadian authorities; judge in Montreal rejects extradition application and releases them; episode creates considerable tension with the United States government
October–December 1864	Cabinet crisis in Prince Edward Island	Prince Edward Island cabinet splits over the Quebec Resolutions and Confederation; Attorney General Edward Palmer, delegate to both the conferences, challenges the proposals; Premier Gray, who supports Confederation, resigns
1865
Date	Event	Result
January 7–9, 1865	New premier in Prince Edward Island	James Colledge Pope, opposed to Confederation, becomes premier of Prince Edward Island
February 3, 1865	Confederation Debates begin in Province of Canada	Lengthy debates begin in the Parliament of the Province of Canada on the merits of the Confederation project
February 6, 1865	Confederation discussed in Newfoundland	Newfoundland premier Hugh Hoyles states in debates that Confederation would not be rushed through the Legislative Assembly
February–March 1865	New Brunswick election	Pro-Confederation government of Premier Tilley defeated by Anti-Confederation group; Anti-Confederation leader, Albert James Smith, becomes premier
February 20, 1865	Confederation Debates in Province of Canada	Quebec Resolutions approved by Legislative Council by vote of 45 to 15
March 2, 1865	Confederation discussed in Prince Edward Island	Premier Pope states in the Legislative Assembly that any Confederation plan would be put to the voters, and that his government does not support Confederation
March 6, 1865	Newfoundland postpones decision	Premier Hoyles proposes to the Legislative Assembly that no decision be taken on the Quebec Resolutions until after the upcoming Newfoundland election
March 10, 1865	Conclusion of Confederation Debates in Province of Canada	Quebec resolutions approved by Legislative Assembly by vote of 91 to 33
March 24–31, 1865	Confederation debates in Legislative Assembly of Prince Edward Island	Premier J.C. Pope leads the Anti-Confederation position in the debates; his brother, William Henry Pope, leads the Pro-Confederation position; Assembly rejects Confederation by vote of 23 to 5
April 10, 1865	Maritime union raised again in Nova Scotia	Considerable opposition to Confederation in Nova Scotia; Premier Tupper introduces motion for re-consideration of Maritime union as a stopgap measure
May 1865	Canadian delegation to Britain	Macdonald, Cartier, Galt and Brown travel to Britain to discuss defence of the Province of Canada, now that the US Civil War is over; no firm commitment from British government
June 24, 1865	Pressure from Britain	The Colonial Secretary, Edward Cardwell, sends a dispatch to the three Maritime provinces, urging them to accept Confederation to aid imperial defence
July 1865	Britain urges Confederation	Anti-Confederation premier Smith of New Brunswick and William Annand, a member of the Anti-Confederation group in the Legislative Assembly of Nova Scotia, travel separately to London to express dissatisfaction with the Confederation proposal; they each meet with Cardwell, the Colonial Secretary; Cardwell advises them that the British government strongly favours Confederation along the lines of the Quebec Resolutions, and will do everything in its power to achieve Confederation
November 6, 1865	York by‑election, New Brunswick	Vacancy in the New Brunswick Assembly forces Anti-Confederation government to call by-election in York riding; Charles Fisher, former premier, delegate to Quebec, and strong supporter of Confederation, wins by-election
November 7, 1865	Newfoundland election	The leaders of the two parties in the Newfoundland election, Frederick Carter and Ambrose Shea, had both been delegates to Quebec and support Confederation; Carter wins the election, but overall, the majority of the members of the Assembly do not support Confederation
1866
Date	Event	Result
February 20, 1866	Newfoundland postpones decision	In first session after the 1865 election, the Newfoundland Legislative Assembly votes to delay any decision on Confederation
March 12, 1866	Governor General Monck intervenes	Monck sends a telegram to Lieutenant Governor Williams, suggesting that Williams make overtures to leader of the Anti-Confederates
March 13, 1866	Lieutenant Governor of Nova Scotia suggests conference	Lieutenant Governor Williams summons Annand, leader of the Anti-Confederates in the Assembly, and suggests that Annand propose a new conference, in London, under the supervision of the Imperial government
April 4, 1866	Anti-Confederation proposal for London Conference	William Miller, a leading Anti-Confederate in the Nova Scotia Assembly, proposes that there be another conference, in London
April 6, 1866	Legislative Council of New Brunswick supports Confederation	The Legislative Council of New Brunswick votes in favour of Confederation and the Quebec Resolutions
April 10, 1866	Nova Scotia proposal for London Conference	Premier Tupper introduces resolution stating that Confederation is desirable, and therefore the Assembly authorises the lieutenant governor "to appoint delegates to arrange with the Imperial Government a scheme of union which will effectually ensure just provision for the rights and interest of this Province..."
April 12–13, 1866	Resignation of Anti-Confederation government of New Brunswick	Premier Smith and his government resign as a result of Lieutenant Governor Gordon accepting the resolution of the Legislative Council, approving of Confederation; Lieutenant Governor Gordon appoints Peter Mitchell, a supporter of Confederation and delegate to the Quebec Conference, as premier
April 17, 1866	Tupper's resolution passes	Nova Scotia Assembly passes Tupper's resolution proposing a conference in London, by a vote of 31 to 19
May 7–8, 1866	Prince Edward Island rejects Confederation	Further debate in the Prince Edward Island Legislative Assembly; clear rejection of Confederation
May–June 1866	New Brunswick election	Lieutenant Governor Gordon dissolves the Assembly on advice of the new government; Pro-Confederation group wins elections, with majority of 33 seats compared to 8 seats for Anti-Confederation group
June 30, 1866	New Brunswick supports London Conference	The New Brunswick Legislative Assembly passes a Resolution to appoint delegates for the London Conference to discuss the union of the colonies, under the auspices of the Imperial government, "upon such terms as will secure the just rights and interests of New Brunswick", including a guarantee for the inter-colonial railway
1866	Last session of Parliament of Province of Canada	Legislative Assembly of Province of Canada passes resolutions setting out proposed constitutions for Ontario and Quebec
December 4–23, 1866	London Conference begins	Delegates from Province of Canada, Nova Scotia and New Brunswick meet in London to review and revise the Quebec Resolutions; revisions include guarantee of the inter-colonial railway and strengthening provisions for denominational and separate schools
December 24, 1866	London Conference concludes	Delegates unanimously approve modified resolutions; Macdonald transmits them to the new Colonial Secretary, Lord Carnarvon, for consideration
1867
Date	Event	Result
January–February 1867	Drafting of the bill	Committee of the delegates begin the drafting process to implement the London Resolutions; extensive consultations with Lord Carnarvon and British drafter; bill goes through several drafts
February–March 1867	Bill passed by British Parliament	Lord Carnarvon introduces the British North America Act, 1867 in the House of Lords; Lord Monck speaks in support; Cardwell, now in opposition, speaks in support in the Commons; bill proceeds through the Lords and the Commons without incident
March 29, 1867	Queen Victoria grants Royal Assent	British North America Act, 1867 enacted as Imperial statute
July 1, 1867	Proclamation of British North America Act, 1867	Canada is created
July 1, 1867	Macdonald appointed first prime minister of Canada	Governor General Monck appoints Macdonald as first prime minister of Canada; Macdonald then sets up the first federal government, appointing the federal Cabinet and the lieutenant governors of the four provinces.
July 1, 1867	Continuation of New Brunswick government	Premier Mitchell continues in office as the first post-Confederation premier of New Brunswick
July 4, 1867	Continuation of Nova Scotia government	Lieutenant Governor Williams appoints Hiram Blanchard as first post-Confederation premier of Nova Scotia, after Premier Tupper resigns to stand for election to the federal House of Commons
July 15, 1867	Creation of first Quebec government	Lieutenant Governor Belleau appoints Pierre-Joseph-Olivier Chauveau as first premier of Quebec
July 16, 1867	Creation of first Ontario government	Lieutenant Governor Stisted appoints John Sandfield Macdonald as first premier of Ontario
August–September 1867	First elections under the British North America Act, 1867	Elections for federal Parliament, Legislative Assemblies of Ontario, Quebec and Nova Scotia (no election in New Brunswick since there had been an election the previous year)

== See also ==
- 150th anniversary of Canada
- History of Canada
- Territorial evolution of Canada
- List of documents from the constitutional history of Canada
- Acadian Renaissance

Comparable acts in Dominion nation-building

- Anglo-Irish Treaty of 1921
- Ceylon Independence Act 1947
- Federation of Australia
- Indian Independence Act 1947
- New Zealand Constitution Act 1852
- National Convention (South Africa)
