= Tache noir =

Tache noir may refer to:

- Black heel and palm: a skin condition characterized by black macules occurring on the posterior edge of the plantar surface of one or both heels.
- Tache noir de la sclerotique: one of the postmortem ocular signs. A film of cell debris and mucus, forms two triangle on sclera at each side of the iris with base toward the margin of cornea and apex towards medial and lateral canthus of eye.
- La Tache noire, a painting by Albert Bettannier.

== See also ==
- Tache (disambiguation)
- Noir (disambiguation)
- Talon noir
