= Jean-Baptiste Taché =

Canadian politician

Jean-Baptiste Taché (French pronunciation: [ʒɑ̃ batist taʃe]; June 11, 1786 – August 22, 1849) was a notary and political figure in Lower Canada. He represented Cornwallis from 1820 to 1824 and Rimouski from 1834 until the suspension of the constitution in 1838 in the Legislative Assembly of Lower Canada. Taché served as a member of the special council that governed Lower Canada from 1839 to 1841 and was a member of the Legislative Council of the Province of Canada from 1841 to 1849.

He was born in Saint-Thomas, the son of Charles Taché and Geneviève Michon, and was educated at the Petit Séminaire de Québec. Taché apprenticed as a notary, was licensed in 1811 and set up practice in Kamouraska. In 1824, he married Charlotte, the daughter of John Mure. He did not run for re-election to the assembly in 1824. In 1842, he was named registrar for Kamouraska County. Taché died in office at Kamouraska at the age of 63.

His uncle Pascal Taché also served in the assembly. His brother Étienne-Paschal and his nephew Joseph-Charles Taché served in the assembly for the Province of Canada; his brother later became one of the Fathers of Confederation.
