= Eugène-Étienne Taché =

French Canadian surveyor, civil engineer, illustrator and architect

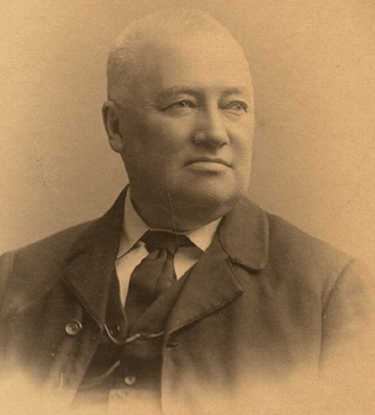
- Born: October 25, 1836; Saint-Thomas parish (at Montmagny), Lower Canada
- Died: March 13, 1912 (aged 75); Quebec City, Quebec
- Father: Étienne-Paschal Taché

Eugène-Étienne Taché, ISO (French pronunciation: [øʒɛn etjɛn taʃe]; October 25, 1836 – March 13, 1912) was a French Canadian surveyor, civil engineer, illustrator and architect. He devised Quebec's provincial coat-of-arms and motto Je me souviens.

As the son of cabinet minister (and future premier) Étienne-Paschal Taché, Eugène-Étienne Taché's early education was quite extensive, but also took place in various locations because of movements to the government. Thus, he studied in both the Petit Séminaire de Québec and at Upper Canada College in Toronto, Ontario. In 1856, Taché took a three-year course in surveying, and in the course of his education successively studied under Frederick Preston Rubidge, Walter Shanly, and finally Charles Baillairgé. In 1861, he began working for the Department of Crown Lands, and in 1869 he became the assistant commissioner of Crown lands for Quebec, a position in which he was subordinate only to the elected minister of Crown Lands. He held this post until his death.

During his time as assistant commissioner, Taché also did extensive architectural work. Although he hadn't studied it formally, Taché learned a great deal from books and journals that he read. He designed the second-Empire style Parliament Building (Quebec) with three towers in Quebec City from spring 1876-1887.

He designed the new courthouse, and various other buildings, including a monastery. He devised the province's coat-of-arms and motto, Je me souviens ("I remember"). Taché died in Quebec City.

In 1903, he was made a Companion of the Imperial Service Order.

== Works ==
- monastery of the Franciscan Missionaries of Mary at Quebec (1895)
- porter’s lodge at Spencer Wood in Sillery (1890)
- Quebec’s pavilion at an exhibition in Jamaica (1891).
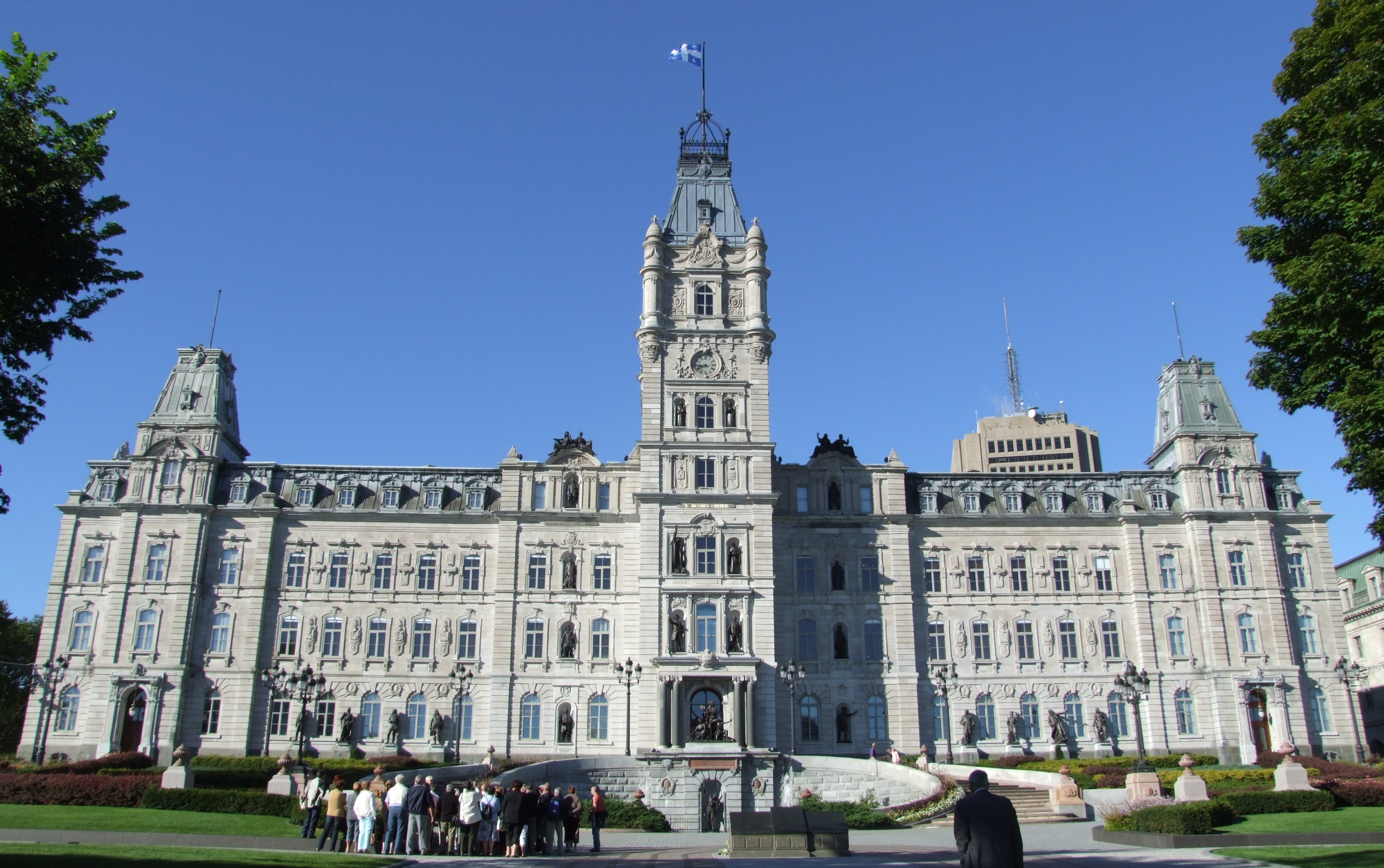
Parliament Building (Quebec) 1876-1887

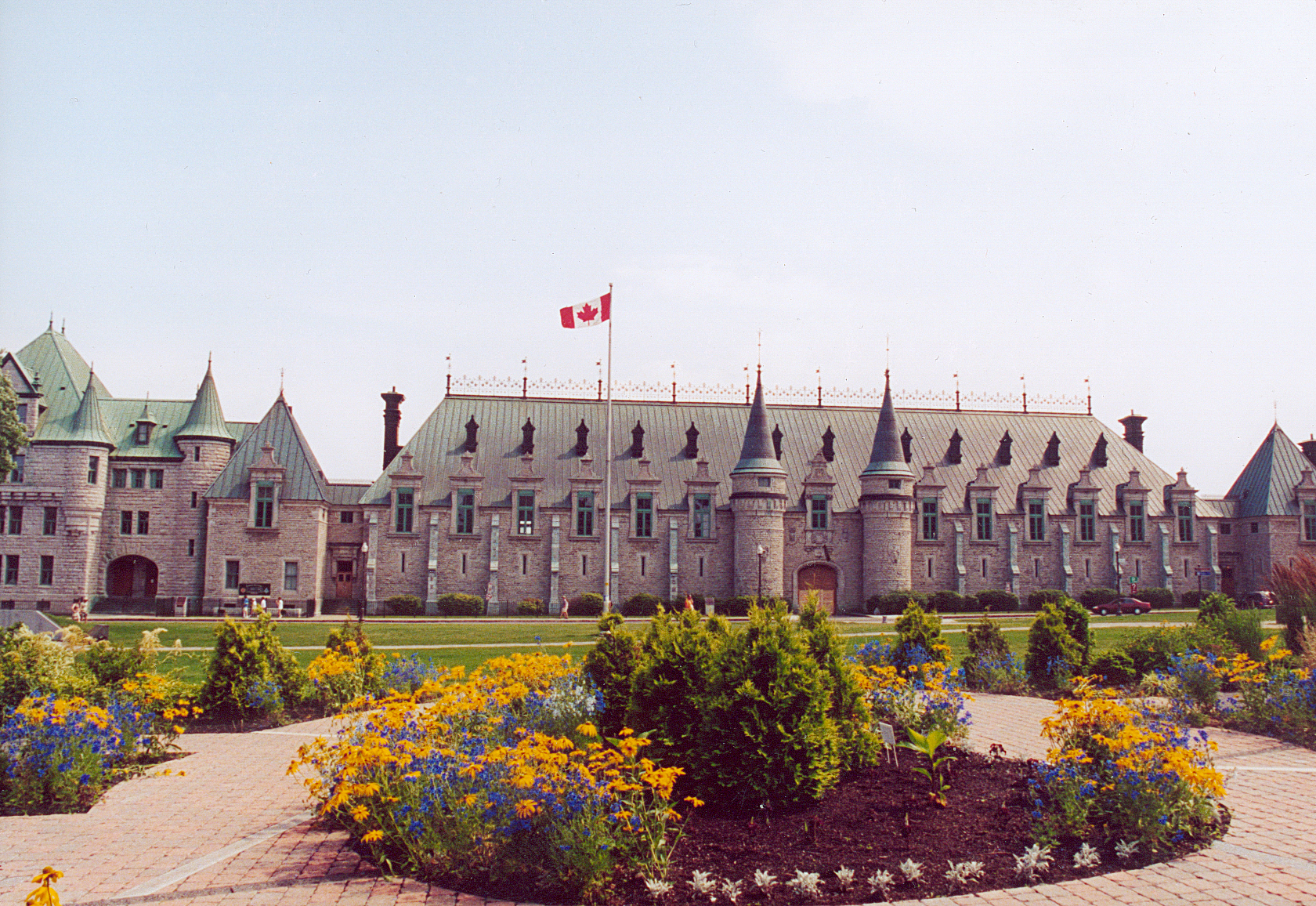
Quebec City Armoury
