= Quebec City Armoury =

Coordinates: 46.8063°N 71.214°W

Grande Allée Drill Hall, Voltigeurs de Québec Armoury
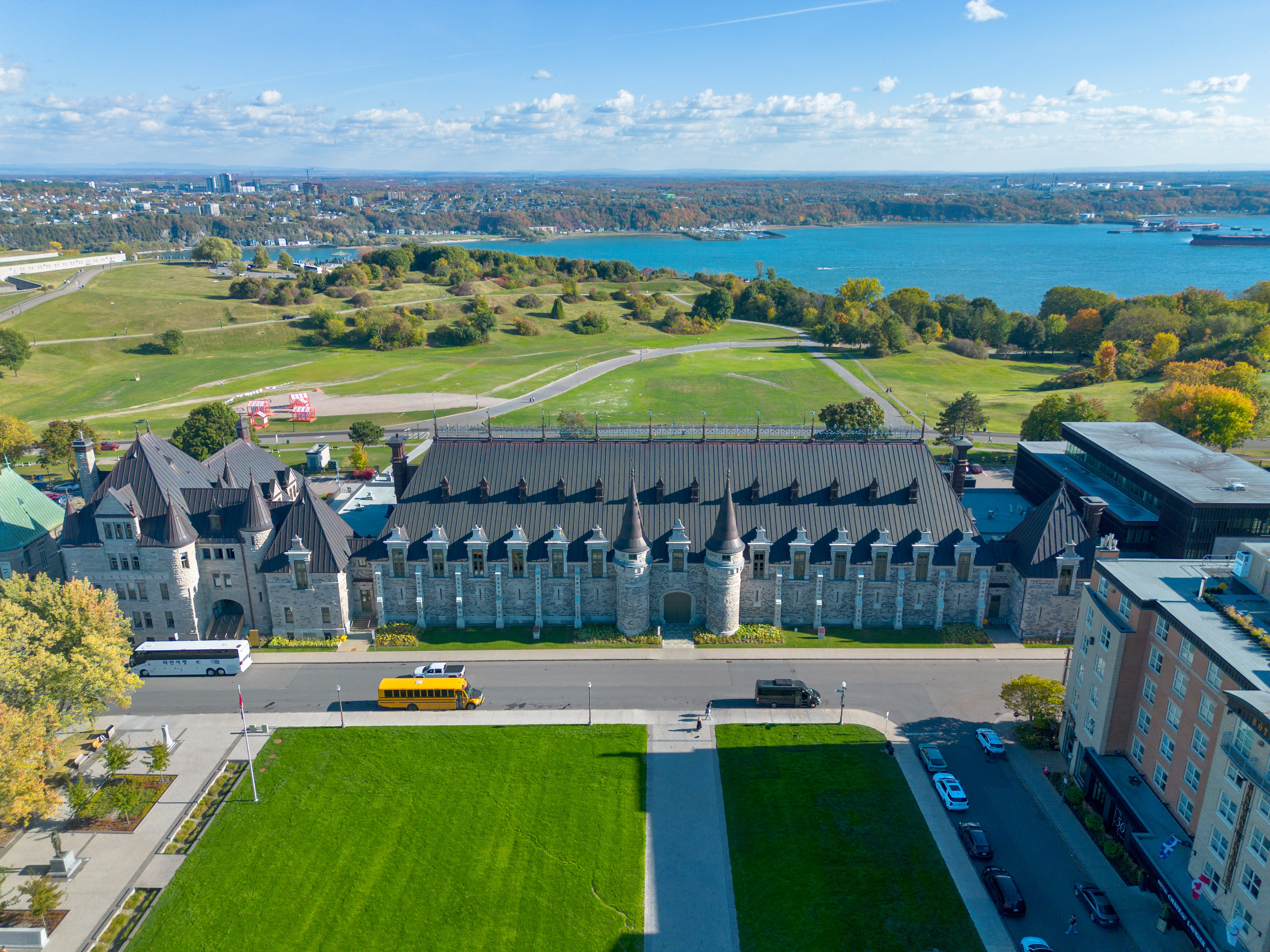
- The Armoury in 2025
- Interactive map of the Grande Allée Drill Hall, Voltigeurs de Québec Armoury area

General information
- Type: Drill Hall / armoury
- Architectural style: Gothic Revival Chateau-style
- Location: 805, avenue Wilfrid-Laurier; Quebec City, Quebec; G1R 2L3
- Construction started: 1885
- Completed: 1888
- Renovated: 2018 (rebuilt)
- Destroyed: 2008 (fire)
- Owner: Canadian Forces

Design and construction
- Architect: Eugène-Étienne Taché
- Awards: National Historic Site; national Register of Historic Places; Classified - 1987 Register of the Government of Canada Heritage Buildings

The Voltigeurs de Québec Armoury, formerly Grande-Allée Armoury (French: Manège militaire Grande-Allée, or simply Manège militaire), was built as a Gothic Revival drill hall for the infantry regiment Les Voltigeurs de Québec in Quebec City, Quebec, Canada. Designed by architect Eugène-Étienne Taché and constructed between 1885 and 1888, it is a National Historic Site.

Partially destroyed by fire in 2008, the armoury was then rebuilt and reopened in May 2018.

== History ==
Interior

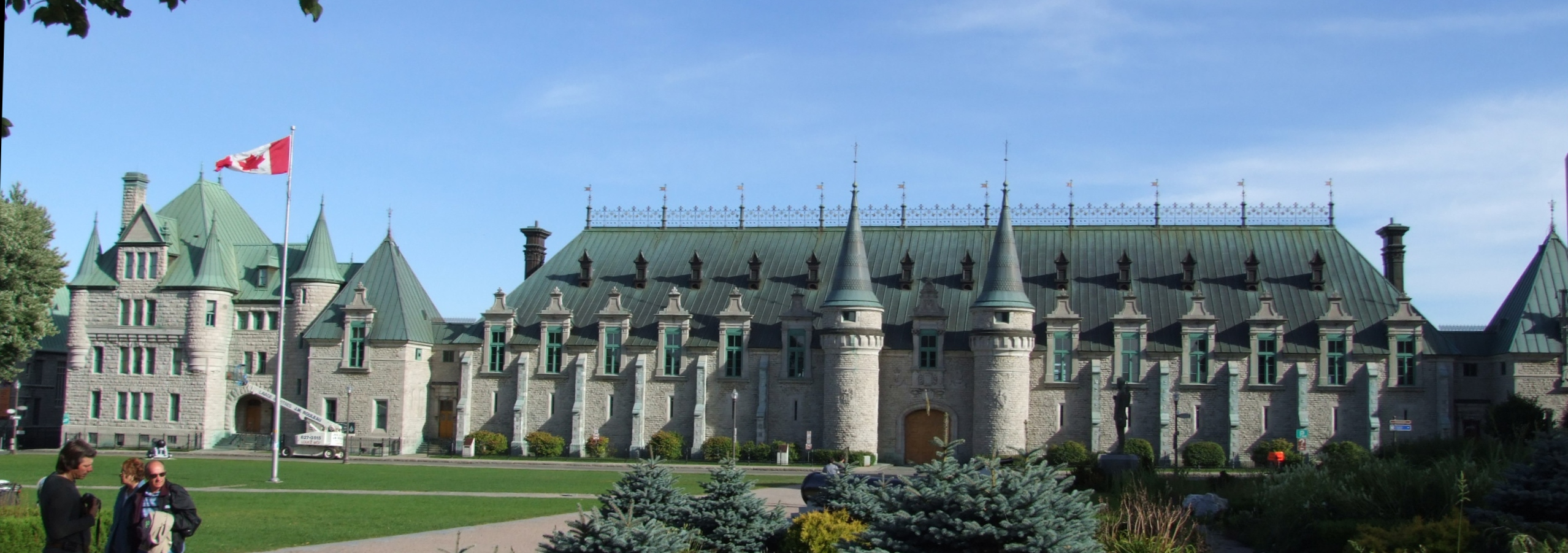
The Armoury before the fire (September 2007)

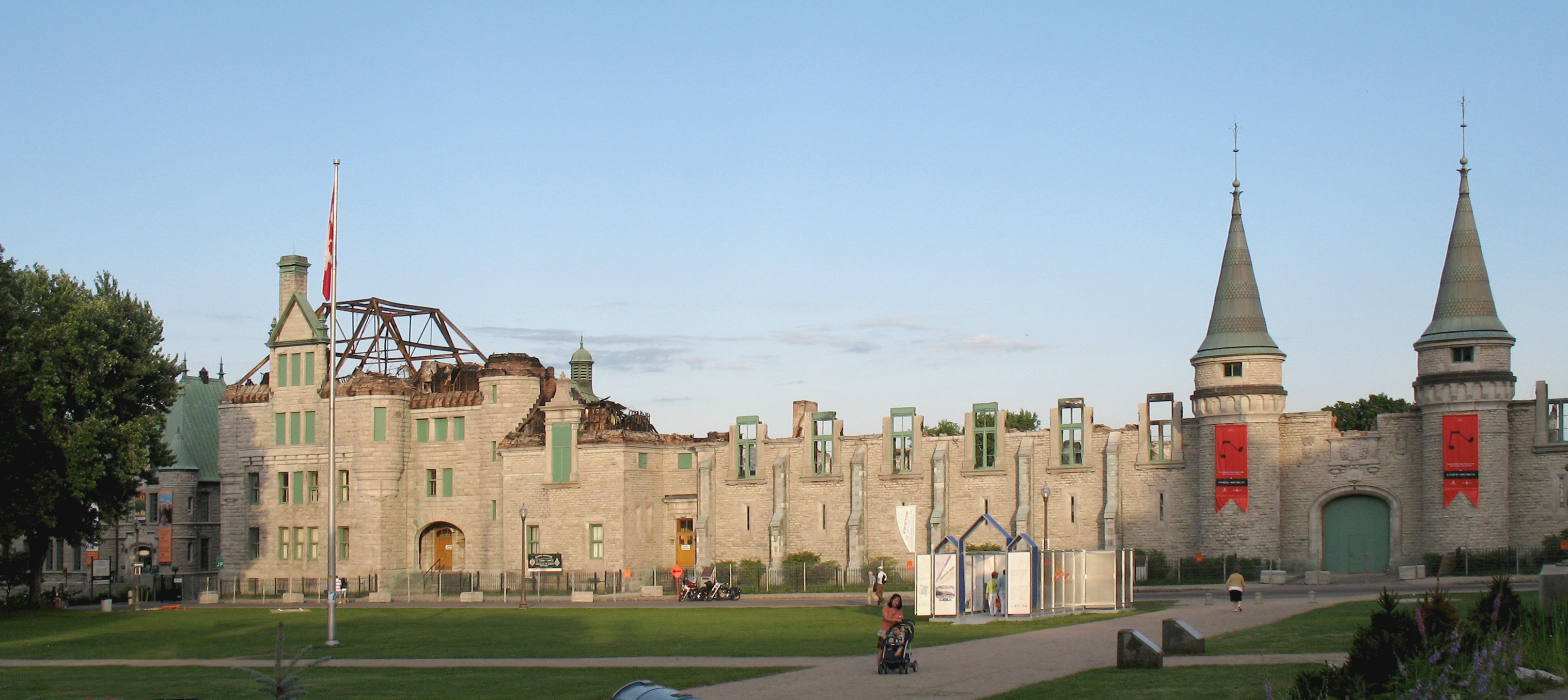
After the fire (July 2008)

In the Canadian Forces, an armoury is a place where a reserve unit trains, meets, and parades.

=== Fire ===
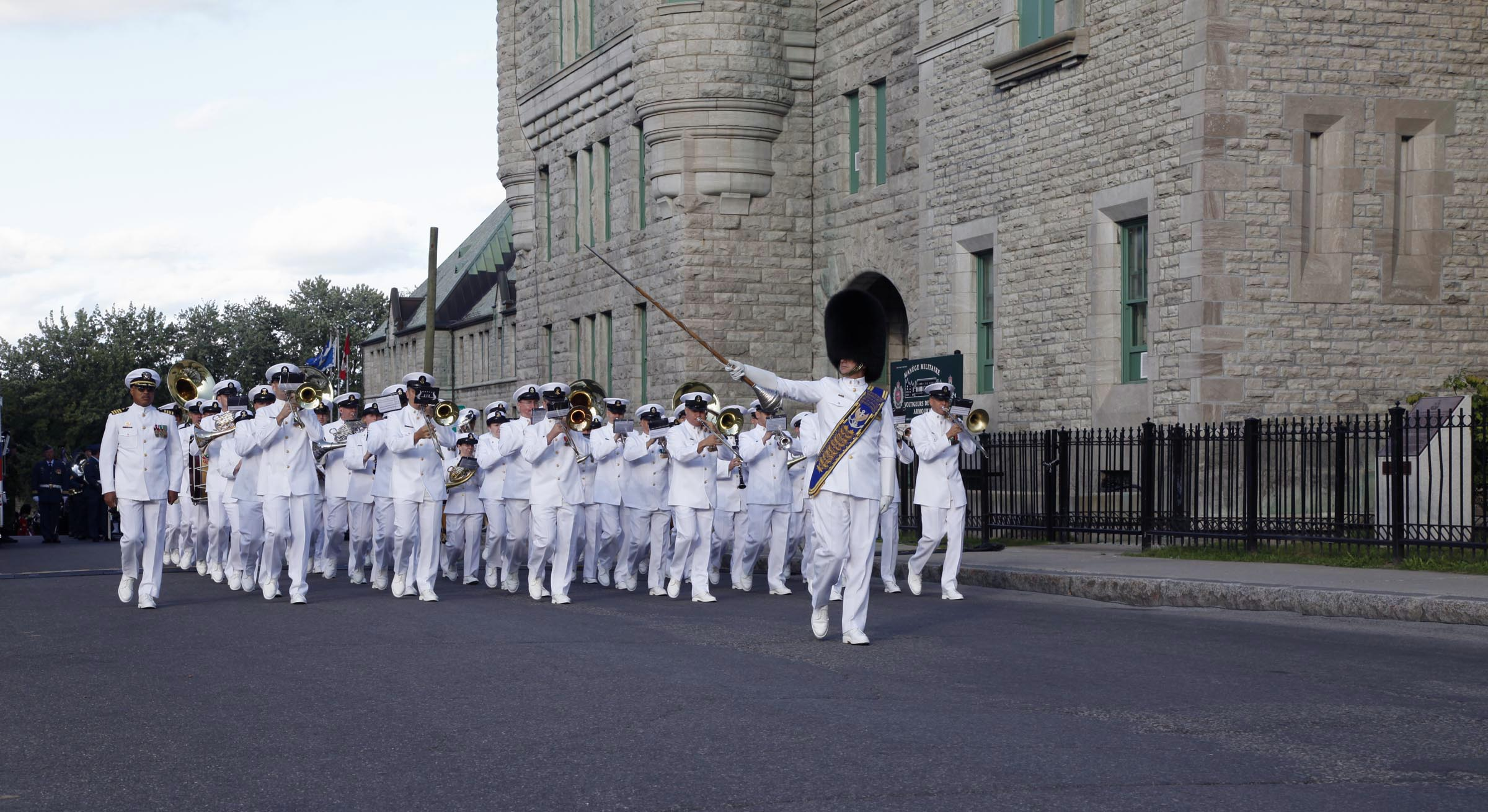
Master Chief Joe D. Brown (wearing a bearskin hat), Drum Major of the United States Navy Band, leading members of the band in front of the Quebec City Armoury as part of the opening ceremony of the Quebec Music Festival.

The Voltigeurs de Québec Armoury was severely damaged by a fire on April 4, 2008. All but a rear wall and turrets beside the front door were burned. Les Voltigeurs de Québec Museum in the amoury which housed various artifacts from the regiment was also lost in the fire. However, officials estimate that 90 percent of the artifacts were saved due to the efforts of members of the regiment and local firefighters. The armoury was to have been one of the venues for the celebration of Quebec's 400th birthday. The armoury's wooden roof was one of the largest of its kind in Canada.

Calls were made by politicians to rebuild the armoury, to which the federal government responded in April 2008 positively by allocating $2 million for reconstruction planning. In the fall of 2008, the regimental association launched a lawsuit against the Department of National Defence, blaming negligence on the part of the federal government for the blaze. In 2010, Intergovernmental Affairs Minister Josée Verner announced federal plans to rebuild the armoury by 2016.

Work was completed by the spring of 2018, and reopened, for use by the public, military, and other government offices.

== Sculpture ==
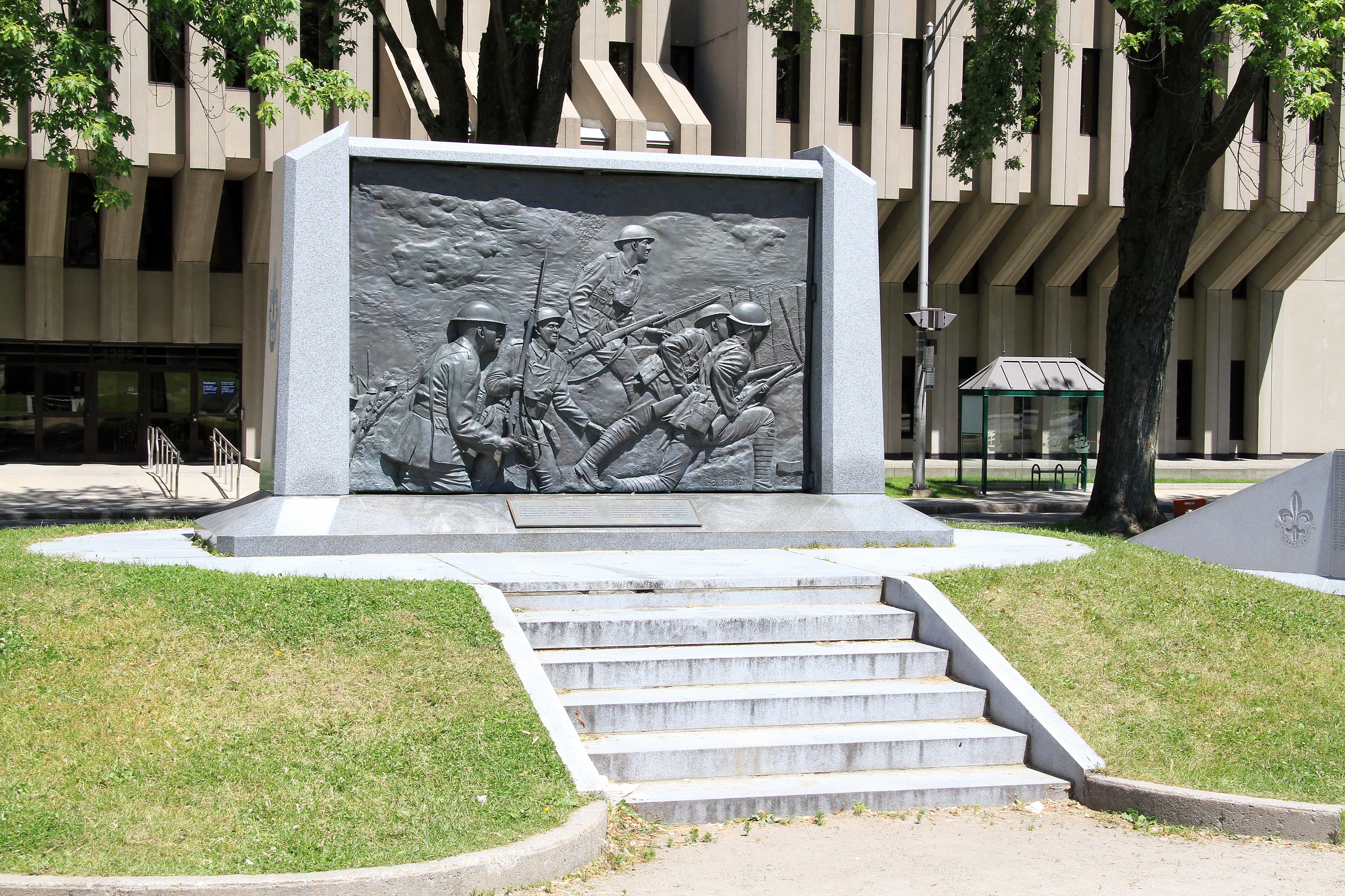
"JE ME SOUVIENS" (1989) by André Gauthier

"JE ME SOUVIENS" (1989) by André Gauthier, a 6’ X 9’ bronze 'haut-relief' bronze and granite wall memorial, was erected at Place George V in front of the armoury. Unveiled on November 11, 1989, the sculpture honours the memory of the soldiers from the Royal 22^{e} Régiment (R 22e R) or Van Doos French Canadian regiment who were killed during the First and Second World Wars and the Korean War. The sculpture was inspired by A.T.C. Bastiens' painting "L'Avance" at the Canadian War Museum. The names of soldiers are inscribed in granite on the monument.

== Plaque ==
A Historic Sites and Monuments Board of Canada plaque was erected in 1991 to commemorate the Grande Allée Drill Hall and its architectural uniqueness.

The Grande Allée Drill Hall is an impressive example of a drill hall that retains its original parade square. Designed by Eugène-Étienne Taché, a Quebec public servant and architect, the stone building was completed in 1887, with an addition in 1913. The steeply pitched gable roof, conical towers and fanciful decorative details of the drill hall make it an early example of the French-inspired Château style. The use of the style here is unique among Canadian drill halls of this period and reflects the late 19th century interest in the historic French roots of the city.

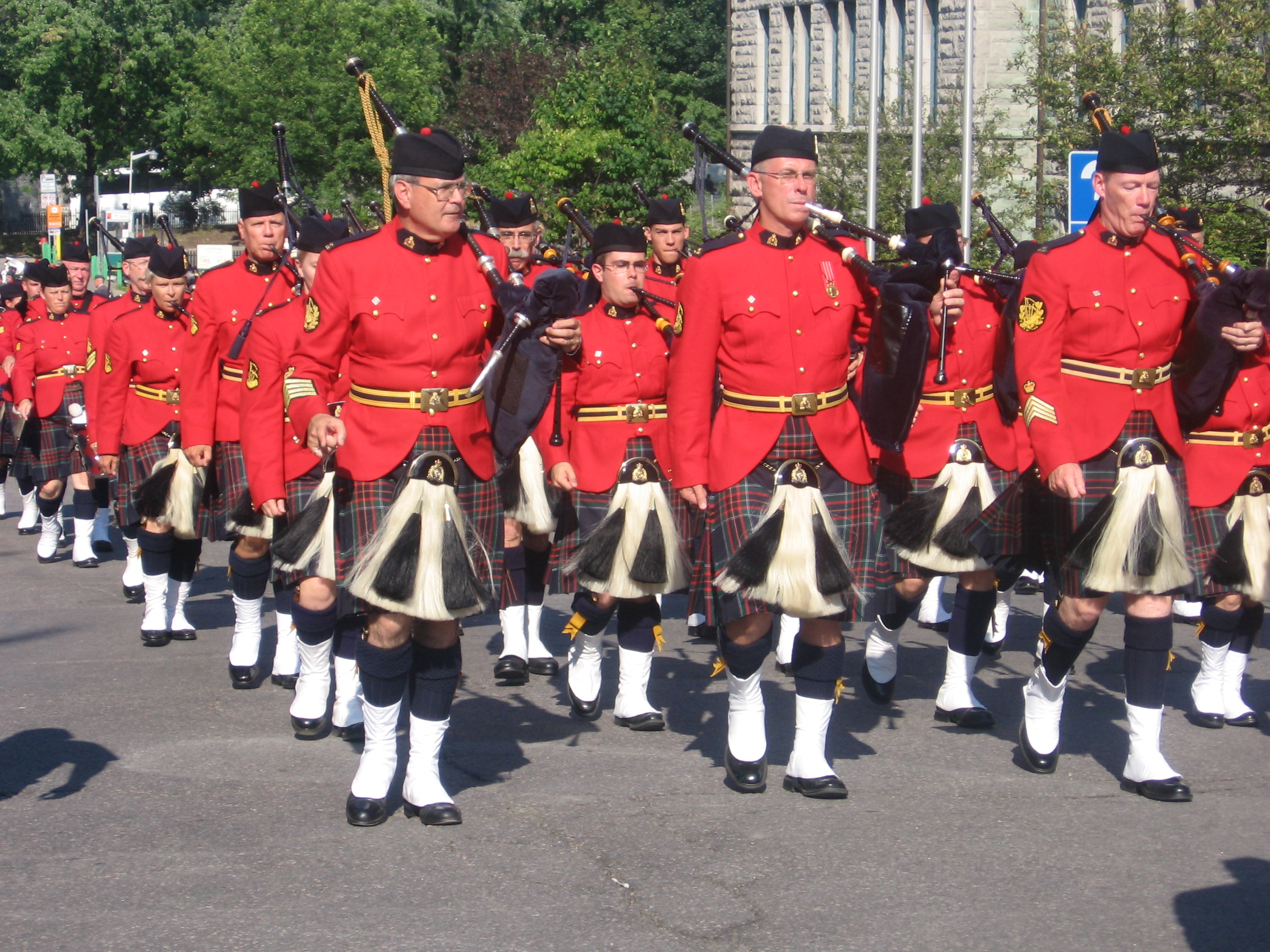
The Band of the Royal Canadian Mounted Police playing in Quebec City

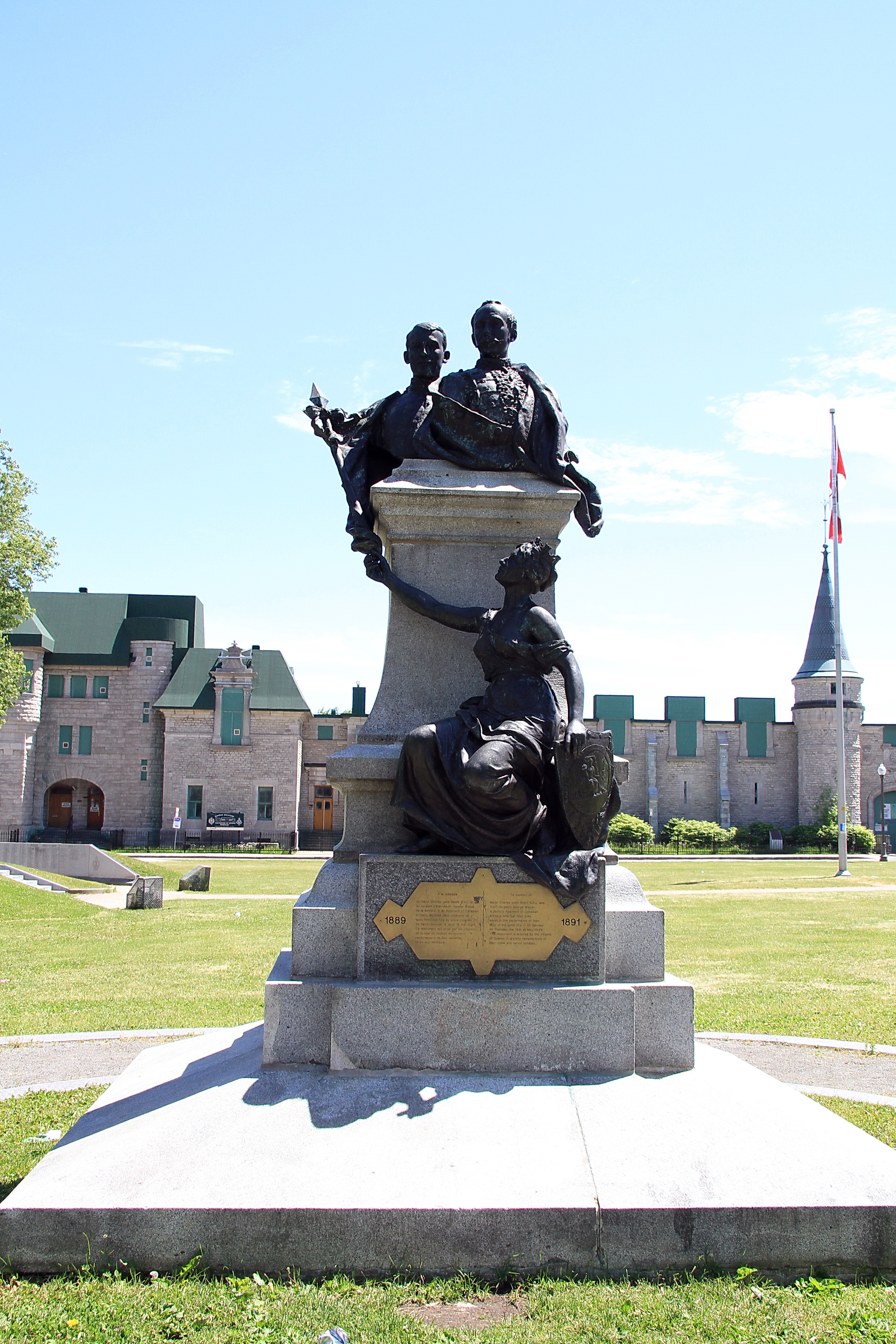
Sculpture at The Quebec City Armoury

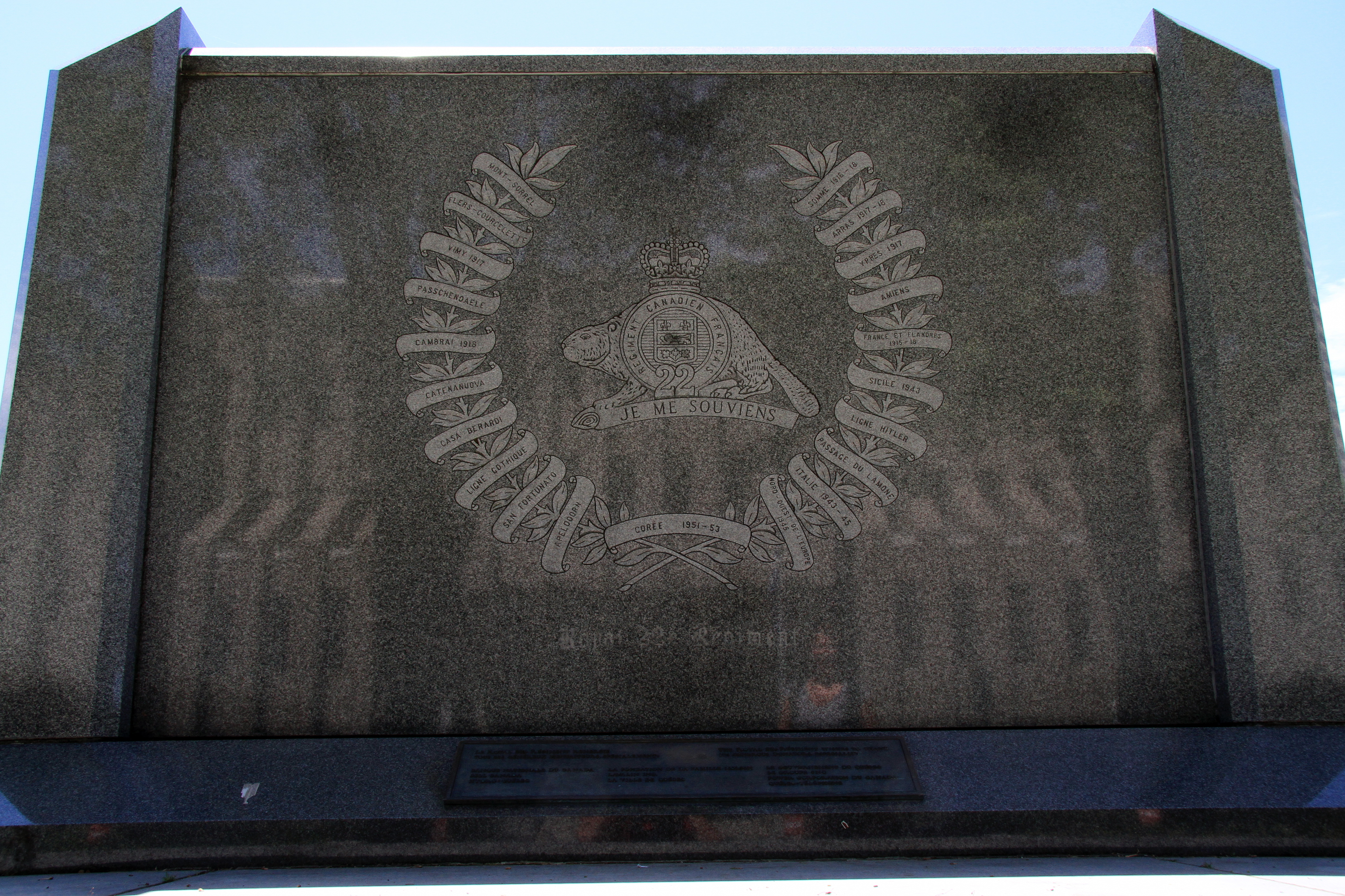
Monument at The Quebec City Armoury

== See also ==
- List of armouries in Canada
- Military history of Canada
- History of the Canadian Army
- Canadian Forces
