= Jean Taché =

- Born: 1698; Garganvilar (now in Tarn-et-Garonne), France
- Died: April 18, 1768 (aged 69–70); Quebec City, Province of Quebec
- Known for: merchant and trader, member of the Grand Jury of the district of Quebec, notary

Jean Taché (French pronunciation: [ʒɑ̃ taʃe]; b. 1698 – April 18, 1768) was a Canadian merchant and trader. He made his first trip to Canada in 1727 to deal in furs and engage in other business activities. By 1730, he had become a permanent resident of the colony and was successful as a merchant and trader. He was also a militia captain in the government of Quebec.

France's surrender of the colony of Quebec in 1763 curtailed his business activities. Under the new British rule, he was one of the first Canadians to be called as members of the Grand Jury for the district of Quebec. In 1768, he received a commission as a notary but died shortly after. He had at least 10 children, and his descendants contributed to French-Canadian society during the 19th century.

On August 27, 1742, Taché married Marie-Anne Jolliet de Mingan, granddaughter of the explorer Louis Jolliet and Jean-Baptiste Jolliet de Mingan. He is the grandfather of Étienne-Paschal Taché, known as one of the Fathers of Confederation, and Jean-Baptiste Taché. Other descendants include writer Joseph-Charles Taché.
