= Pascal Taché =

Canadian politician

Pascal Taché, (French pronunciation: [paskal taʃe]; b. August 30, 1757 – d. June 5, 1830), was the son of Jean Taché, a successful merchant and trader and the patriarch of the important Taché Canadian family.

He was born at the town of Quebec in 1757. In 1785, Pascal married the co-seigneur at Kamouraska. Five years later he received his mother-in-law's share of the seigneury. Pascal managed this seigneury through a period of good expansion as well as exercising his commission as a justice of the peace. He also had a brief foray into politics serving as an elected member of the House of Assembly of Lower Canada for Cornwallis district; he was elected in a 1798 by-election held after the death of the previously elected member.

Pascal's only son, Paschal Taché, inherited his mothers share of the seigneury upon her death in 1813. Father and son co-administered the properties until Pascal's death at Kamouraska in 1830.
