= Tache Noire De La Sclerotique =

Discolouration of the eye typically associated with corpses

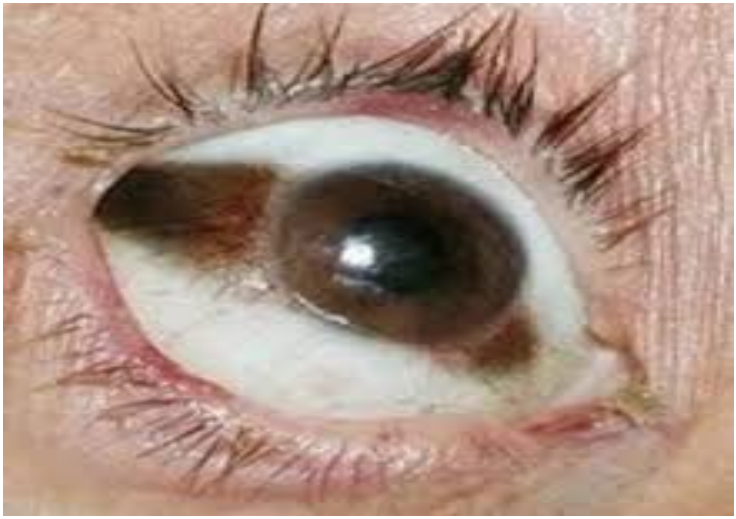
Tache noire de la sclerotique on a cadaver

Tache noire de la sclerotique (French for Black spot of the sclera), often simply referred to as tache noire, is a phenomenon in which the sclera of the eye dries out and becomes discoloured, forming a yellow to black triangle or band corresponding to the position of the eyelids. The phenomenon is most commonly reported in corpses, but has been documented in living individuals who are unable to blink.

== Presentation ==
Tache noire de la sclerotique presents as triangular or linear desiccation and discolouration of the conjunctiva on one or both sides of the cornea, often giving the appearance of a horizontal band across the sclera. This discolouration initially appears yellowish, becoming yellow-brown or red and eventually darkening to black. Tache noire may appear similar to subconjunctival haemorrhage, but can be differentiated from haemorrhage by its symmetrical presentation corresponding to the position of the eyelids. It occurs most commonly in corpses, but is sometimes reported in living individuals. It also occurs in animals, but is often less noticeable due to the relatively larger cornea and smaller area of exposed sclera.

== Causes ==
Tache noire de le sclerotique is a result of the eyelids remaining open over an extended period, causing the exposed area of the sclera to dry out and accumulate dust. This often occurs in corpses, developing in as little as one to two hours post-mortem when the eyelids remain open. In the living, tache noire may present in individuals suffering from prolonged eye exposure due to incomplete eyelid closure.
