= Talon noir =

Talon noir is a dermatologic finding constituting an intraepidermal hemorrhage on a foot. Appearing as an asymmetrical brown-black epidermal lesion, it occurs in runners and hikers as a result of repeated trauma to the foot. Its onset is thus acute. Talon noir can cause concern as it resembles acral melanoma, though unlike acral melanoma, talon noir is benign and self-limiting.
