= Confederation Building =

Confederation Building may refer to:

- Confederation Building (Newfoundland and Labrador), home of the Newfoundland and Labrador House of Assembly
- Confederation Building (Ottawa), a 1931 Canadian federal government office building in Ottawa
- Confederation Building (Winnipeg)
- Confederation Building (Montreal), an office building in Montreal
