= Alexandre Taché =

Alexandre Taché may refer to:

- Alexandre-Antonin Taché (1823–1894), Canadian Roman Catholic priest and bishop
- Alexandre Taché (politician) (1899–1961), Quebec lawyer, judge and politician
