= Confederation Park (disambiguation) =

Confederation Park is a park in the centre of Canada's capital city, Ottawa.

Confederation Park may also refer to:

- Confederation Park, Calgary
- Confederation Park, a municipal park and marina in front of Kingston City Hall (Ontario)
- Confederation Park, Saskatoon, a neighbourhood

== See also ==
- Confederation Square
