= Joseph-Charles Taché =

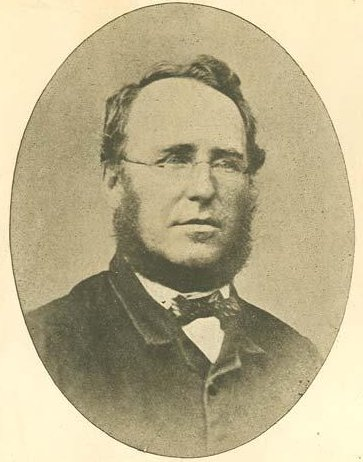

Members of the Legislative Assembly of the Province of Canada for Rimouski
- In office 1848–1857

Personal details
- Born: December 24, 1820 Kamouraska, Lower Canada
- Died: April 16, 1894 (aged 73) Ottawa, Ontario

Joseph-Charles Taché, (French pronunciation: [ʒozɛf ʃaʁl taʃe]; December 24, 1820 – April 16, 1894) was a member of the Taché family, a nephew of Sir Étienne-Paschal Taché. He was a student at the Petit Séminaire de Québec and followed this by a study of medicine, receiving his medical diploma in 1844.

Taché practised medicine in Rimouski, and, at the age of 27, he was unopposed for a seat in the Legislative Assembly. His activity in politics led him into the newspaper business as a writer renowned for his caustic political wit. He worked as a writer and editor until 1859 when he left Le Courrier du Canada to pursue other writing full-time. He returned to public life in 1864 as a senior civil servant in Ottawa for 24 years in literary, cultural, scientific and political areas. He oversaw the 1871 census.
