= Étienne-Paschal Taché =

Canadian Father of Confederation (1795–1865)

Sir Étienne-Paschal Taché
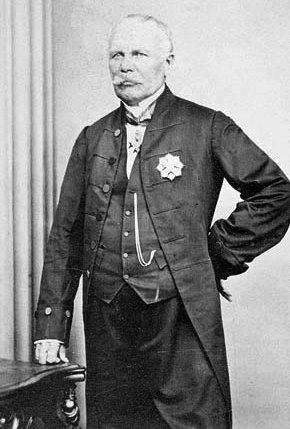
- Sir Étienne-Paschal Taché, Father of Confederation, wearing the star and ribbon of the papal order of St. Gregory the Great

Member of the Legislative Assembly of the Province of Canada for L'Islet
- In office 1841–1846 (two elections)
- Preceded by: New position
- Succeeded by: Charles-François Fournier

Personal details
- Born: September 5, 1795 St Thomas, Lower Canada
- Died: July 30, 1865 (aged 69) Montmagny, Canada East
- Party: Lower Canada: Parti patriote (prior to 1837); Province of Canada: Groupe canadien-français (1841–1846); Parti bleu
- Spouse: Sophie Baucher dit Morency
- Relations: Jean Taché (grandfather)
- Children: 15
- Education: Petit Séminaire de Québec
- Profession: Physician

Military service
- Allegiance: Lower Canada
- Branch/service: Canadian Militia
- Rank: Colonel (militia; active and reserve); Colonel (British Army; honorary)
- Unit: 5th Battalion, Select Embodied Militia; Canadian Chasseurs
- Battles/wars: War of 1812: Battle of the Châteauguay; Battle of Plattsburg

Sir Étienne-Paschal Taché (5 September 1795 – 30 July 1865) was a Canadian medical doctor, politician, and Father of Confederation. His family had a long history in New France, but suffered serious financial reverses due to the Seven Years' War and the siege of Quebec. He was considered a self-made man, who became a physician, a militia soldier, and a politician. He served twice as joint premier of the Province of Canada.

Taché was a strong supporter of the Confederation of the British North American provinces, and the maintenance of the British connection. From June 1864, he was the formal head of the Great Coalition which pushed for Confederation, containing John A. Macdonald, George-Étienne Cartier and George Brown, but he died in office in 1865, two years before Confederation and the creation of Canada.

== Early life and family ==
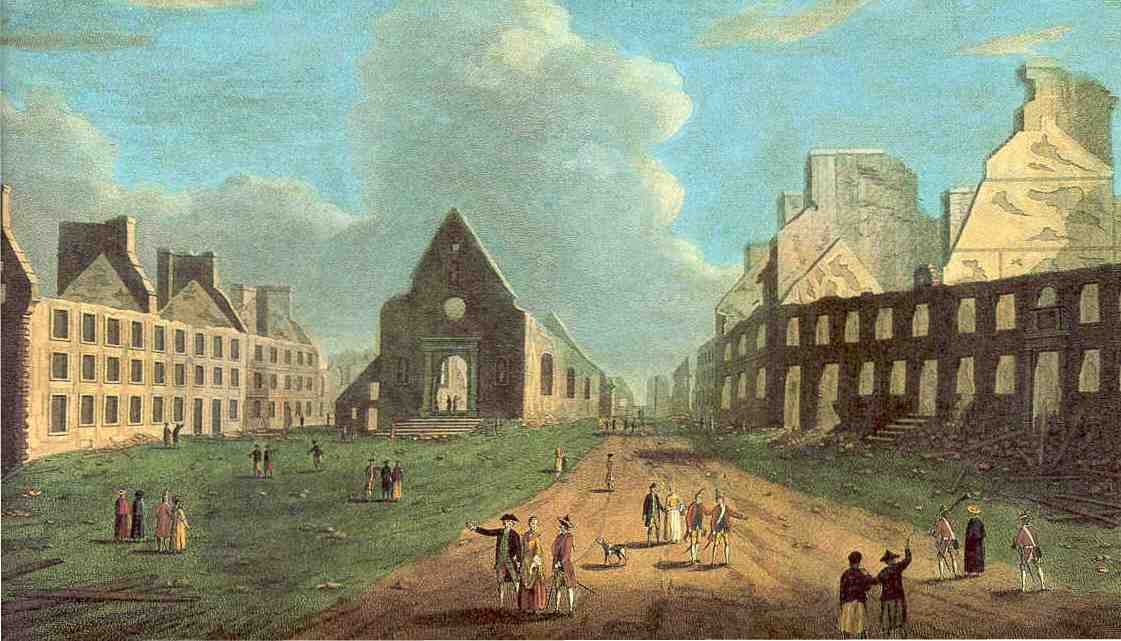
The town of Quebec in 1759

Taché was born in St. Thomas, Lower Canada (now Montmagny, Quebec) in 1795, the third son of Charles Taché and Geneviève Michon. The Taché family had been wealthy prior to the Conquest. Taché's grandfather, Jean Taché, was a Paris merchant who emigrated to New France in 1730 and became one of the leading merchants and ship-owners in Quebec City. Jean Taché also married well; his wife was Marie-Anne Jolliet de Mingan, the granddaughter of the explorer Louis Jolliet. However, the family fortunes were badly damaged by the Seven Years' War and the siege of Quebec. The Taché family was of the seigneurial class, but the traditional seigneury did not provide much income for the family. As a result, in light of his successes in life, Étienne-Paschal Taché was considered to be a self-made man.

Alexandre Antonin Taché, who entered the priesthood and became Archbishop of St. Boniface in Manitoba, was his nephew.

== Military service ==
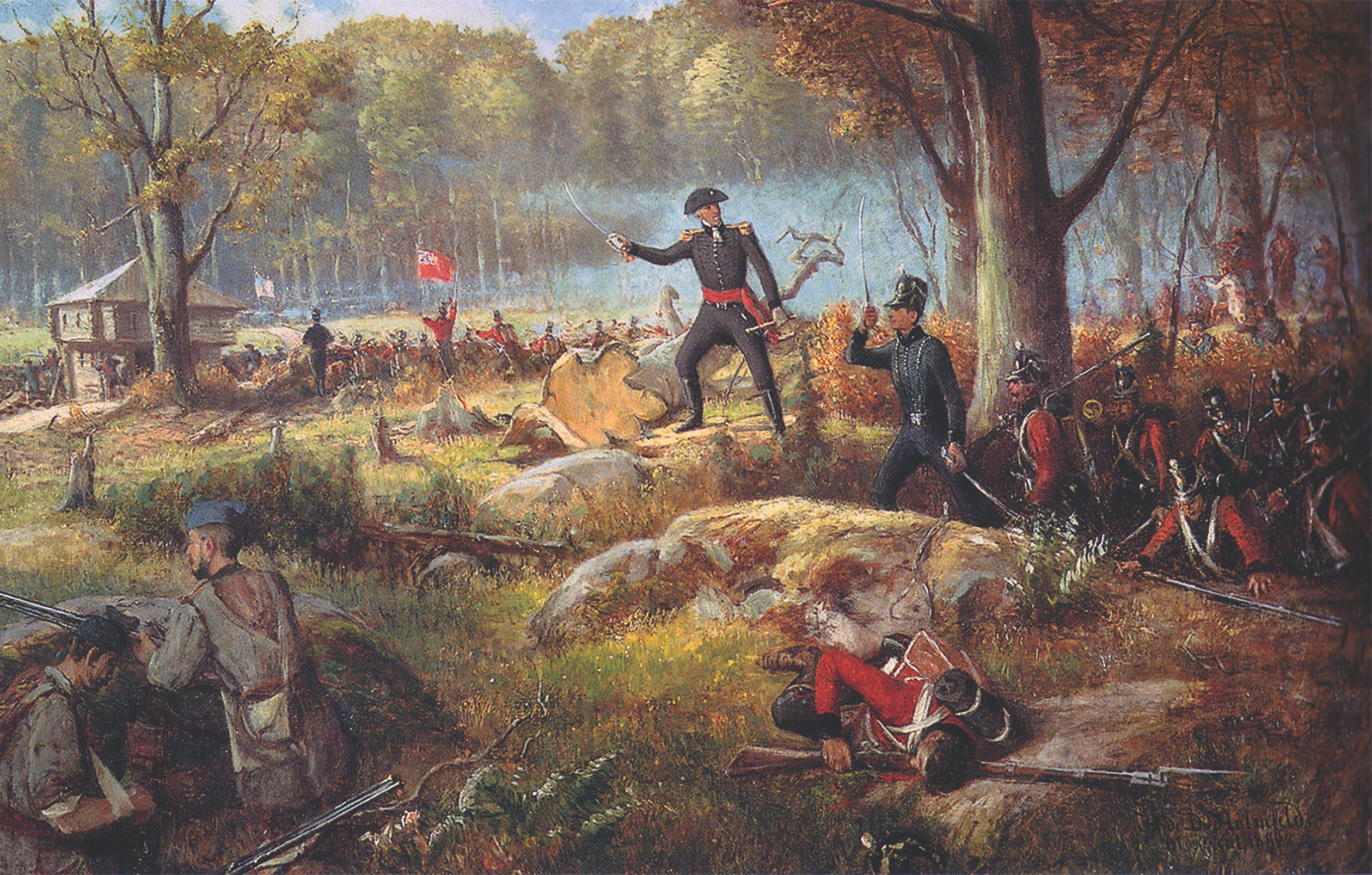
Battle of the Châteauguay, 1813

Taché studied at the Petit Séminaire de Québec until the War of 1812. Although still a teenager, he left school and joined the 5th Battalion of the Select Embodied Militia of the Lower Canada militia as an ensign. He was later promoted to lieutenant and fought in the Chasseurs Canadiens. He was present at two key battles, the Battle of the Châteauguay, which saved Montreal from being occupied by the invading American forces, and the Battle of Plattsburgh, which ended the British attempt to invade the United States via Lake Champlain.

After the battle, there were conflicting claims for the credit of the victory, by the Governor General, the general commanding British North American troops, and Lieutenant Colonel de Salaberry. A pseudonymous letter appeared shortly afterwards in the Montreal Gazette by a "témoin oculaire" ("eye-witness") stating that the victory had been won by de Salaberry's leadership. Several years after the battle, Taché stated that he knew that the letter had been written by Michael O'Sullivan, aide-de-camp to de Salaberry, who had been in the heat of the battle. The letter is important contemporary evidence concerning the battle, and Taché's statement was significant for confirming its authenticity.

Taché retained a life-long interest in military affairs, which he relied upon during his political career. He rose to the rank of colonel in the Canadian militia, and was appointed an honorary colonel in the British Army.

== Medical career ==
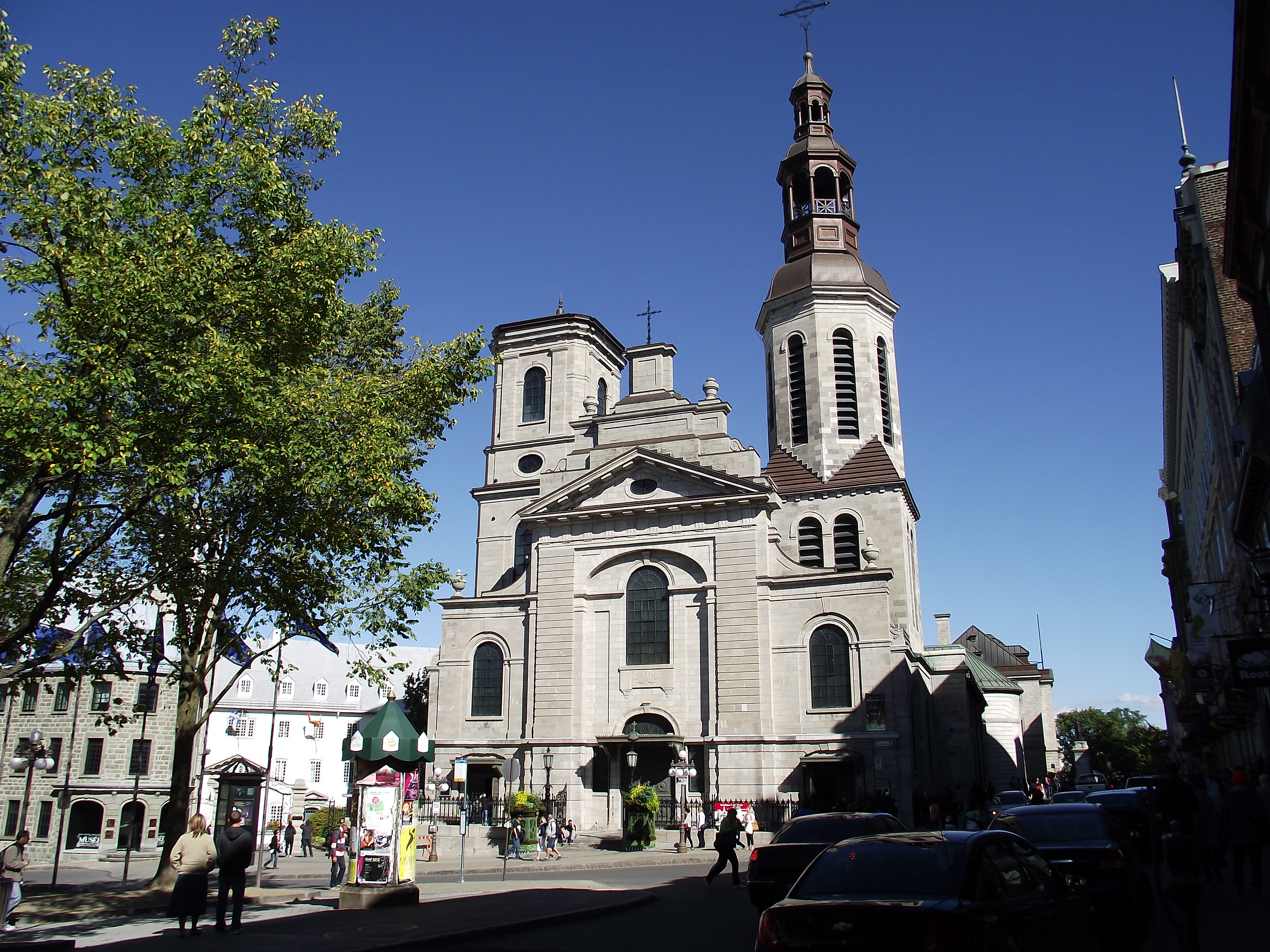
Cathedral of Notre-Dame-de-Québec, where Taché married Sophie Baucher dit Morency in 1820

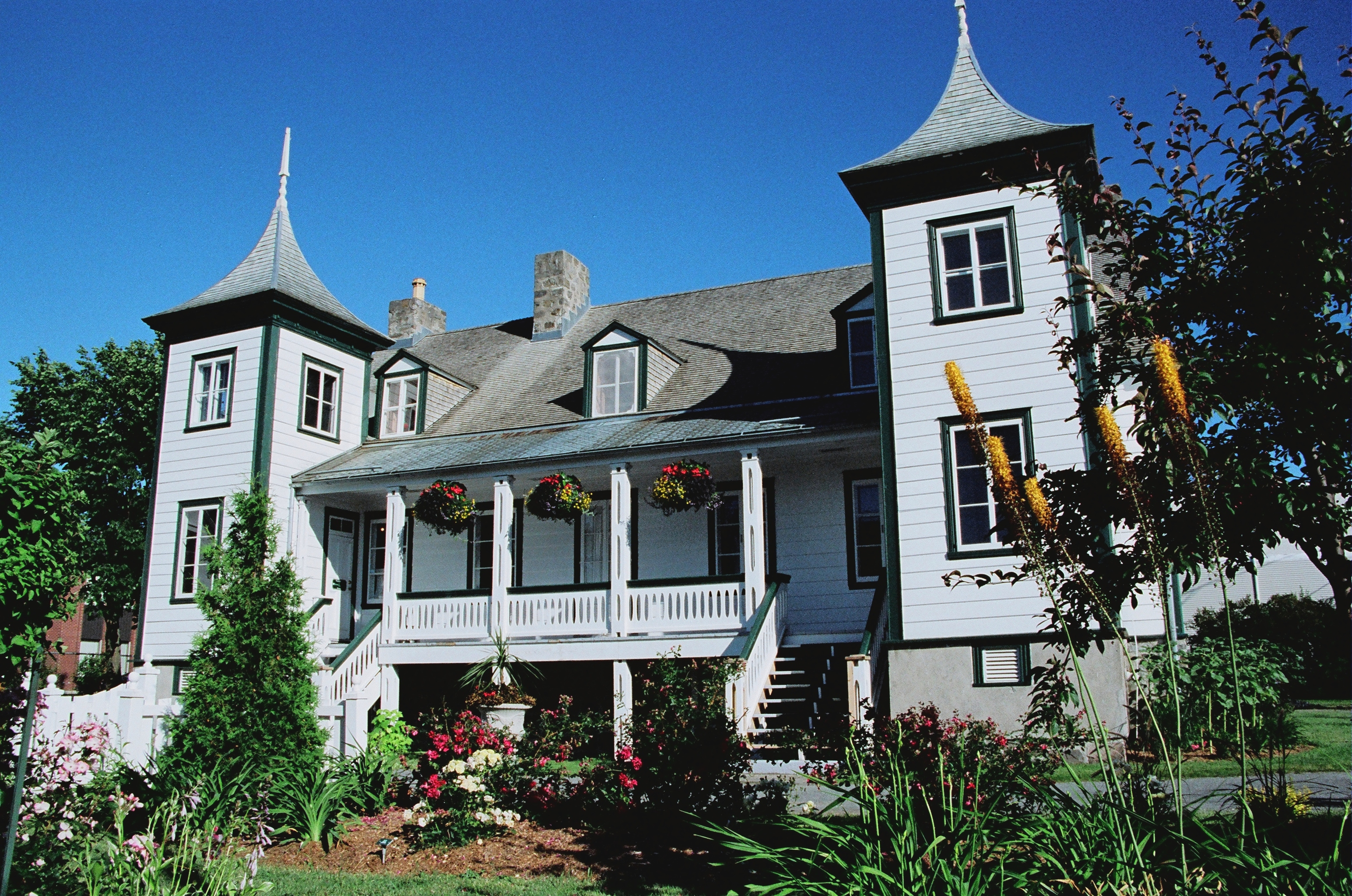
The Taché family house in Montmagny, now a National Historic Site

In his spare time in military camps during the war, Taché started medical studies. After the war, he took further instruction under a well-known physician in Lower Canada, Pierre de Sales Laterrière, and then continued his studies at the University of Pennsylvania in Philadelphia. He obtained his medical licence in Lower Canada in 1819 and started to practise medicine in Montmagny.

The next year, on 18 July 1820, Taché married Sophie Baucher, dit Morency, in Quebec City; they had 15 children. For the next twenty years, he developed a thriving practice on the south shore of the St. Lawrence, acquiring a significant social standing which later helped his political career.

When Taché was first admitted to the practice of medicine, British doctors in Lower Canada had a monopoly over admission to the medical profession. By 1831, he was a member of the Quebec Medical Society when it acquired the right to elect the members of the boards of examiners in Quebec City and Montreal, ending the monopoly of the British doctors. Taché was elected to the Quebec City board of examiners, which for the first time had a large number of Canadien doctors.

== Political career ==
=== Patriote movement ===
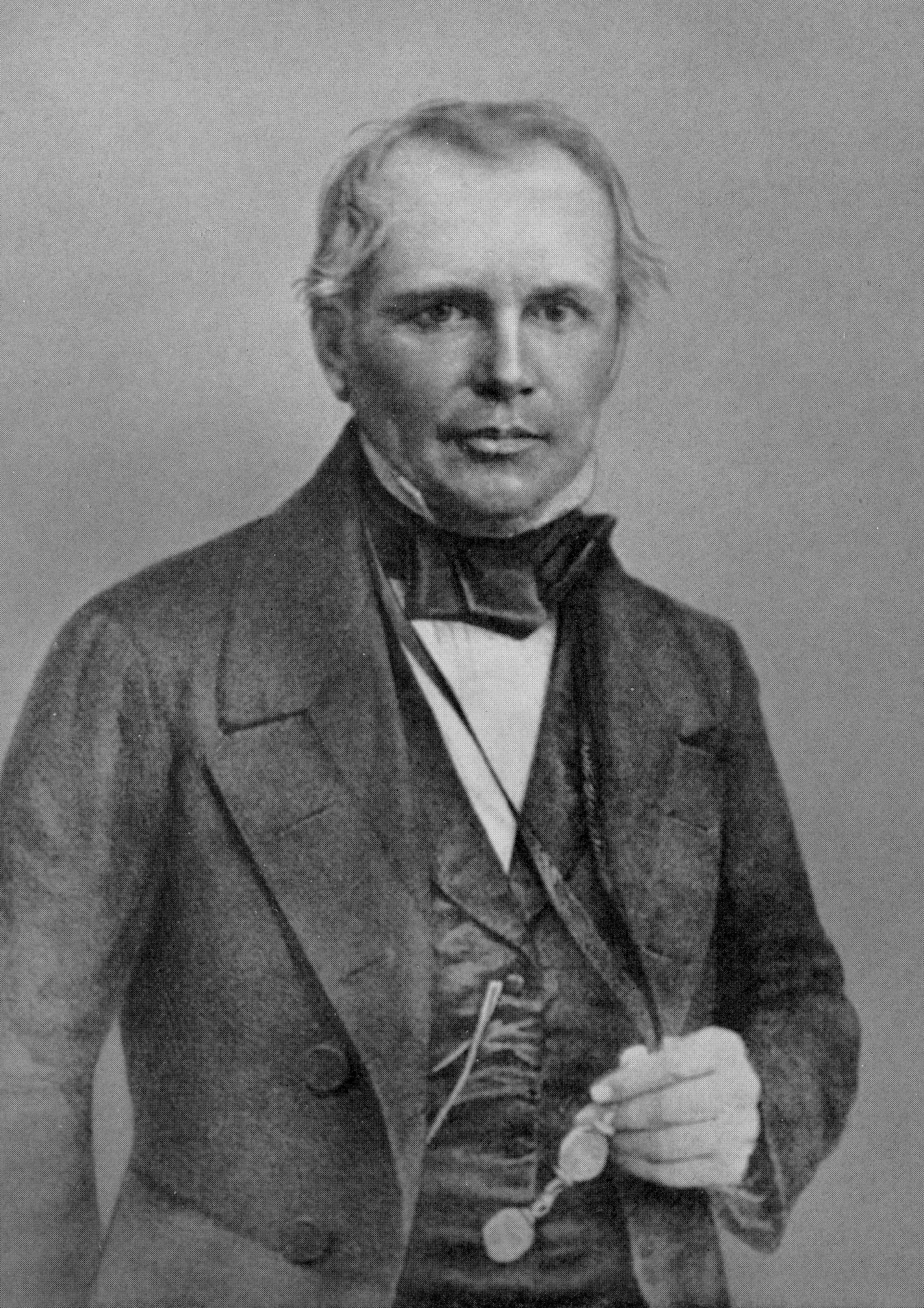
Dr Taché in middle age

Taché was at the heart of the Patriote movement in Montmagny. In 1836, he attended a major meeting of the Patriotes in Trois-Rivières, where they set out their grievances with British rule in Lower Canada. In 1837, he organised a Patriote meeting at Montmagny, attended by Patriote leaders such as Louis-Joseph Papineau, Louis-Hippolyte LaFontaine, Jean-Joseph Girouard, and Augustin-Norbert Morin, who came "to fire the zeal" of the Patriotes in the area.

Taché did not support armed rebellion, but he nonetheless gave shelter to Morin at one point during the Lower Canada Rebellion in 1837. There was also a deposition by one informant in 1838, in the aftermath of the Rebellion, that Taché was active in the Frères chasseurs in the Kamouraska area, and might be planning to try to seize the lower River Saint-Lawrence. Hearing rumours of Taché's activities, the British authorities issued a search warrant for his house in January 1839. Taché was absent when the search occurred. No firearms were found and he was not arrested. Although Taché did not support armed rebellion, neither did he condemn those who took up arms. In his view, they were only a few hundred men who were driven to despair by the actions of the British government.

=== Province of Canada ===
Following the rebellion in Lower Canada, and the similar rebellion in 1837 in Upper Canada (now Ontario), the British government decided to merge the two provinces into a single province, as recommended by Lord Durham in the Durham Report. The Union Act, 1840, passed by the British Parliament, abolished the two provinces and their separate parliaments, and created the Province of Canada, with a single parliament for the entire province, composed of an elected Legislative Assembly and an appointed Legislative Council. The Governor General retained a strong position in the government.

Taché now embarked on a political career. Closing down his medical practice, he was a candidate in the 1841 general election for the new Legislative Assembly of the Province of Canada. Campaigning against the union of the Canadas, he was unopposed in the constituency of L'Islet and was elected by acclamation. When the first Parliament was summoned, Taché was a member of the French-Canadian Group. He voted against the principle of the union, opposed the policies of Governor-General Lord Sydenham, and generally voted in favour of the reform proposals of La Fontaine and Robert Baldwin, particularly responsible government.

He held numerous posts in successive administrations, including, for a time, joint-premier of the province (1856–1857, 1864–1865) as well as Minister of Militia and Defence for the Province of Canada (1855 to 1860).

=== Father of Confederation ===
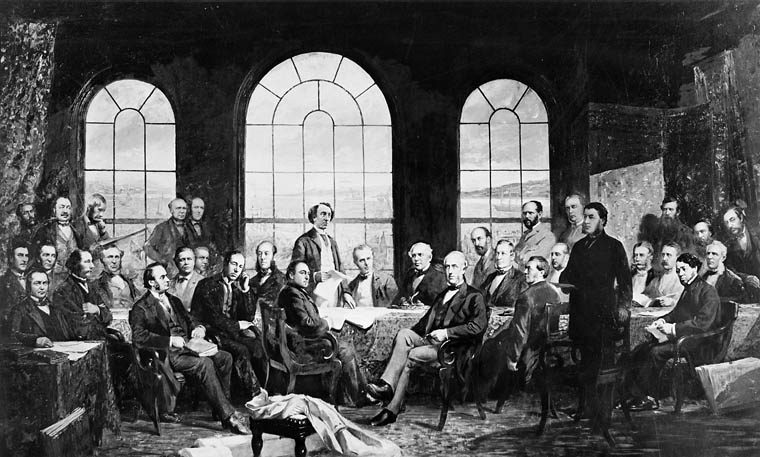
Taché was the presiding officer at the Quebec Conference of 1864 (second to the right of Macdonald, standing before the window)

Taché actively participated in the debate on the potential creation of a Canadian confederation, defended proposals for the new form of government in part because it would serve to reaffirm Canada's link to the British Empire. At the Confederation Debates, he stated that "Confederation was imperative if Canadians 'desired to remain British and monarchical, and ... desired to pass our children these advantages'". These ideas reflected the ideas of the conservative Parti bleu (with which Taché was associated).

An avid supporter of the British Crown, Taché expressed ideas of loyalty even before the debates regarding the creation of Canada's confederation: "in 1848, he delivered his famous idea of French-Canadian loyalty to the British crown: ... 'we will never forget our allegiance till the last cannon which is shot on this continent in defence of Great Britain is fired by the hand of a French-Canadian'". This can certainly explain why Taché worked with future Prime Minister John A. Macdonald and other significant characters who were Fathers of the Confederation and who shared similar views. Therefore, these alliances led to the Great Coalition of 1864 – 'a government led by Cartier, Brown and Macdonald under the premiership of a bleu elder statesman, Sir Étienne-Paschal Taché' - responsible for the Canadian Confederation. For this matter, Taché presided of over the Quebec City conference of 1864.

Sir Étienne-Paschal Taché's loyalty was officially recognized as an "aide-de-camp to [ Queen Victoria ], [and] held the honorary rank of a Colonel in the army". When Edward, Prince of Wales, toured British North America in 1860, Taché was specially attached to the Prince's staff.

== Death and legacy ==
Taché died at age 69 in Montmagny, and is buried there at St. Odilon Cemetery, where a marker from the national Historic Sites and Monuments Board marks his grave. A monument to him stands at 141 Taché Boulevard East in Montmagny.

== Honours and recognition ==
- 1858: knighted by Queen Victoria
- 1860: appointed honorary colonel in the British Army and aide-de-camp to Queen Victoria
- 1862: appointed to the Order of St. Gregory the Great
- 1937: designated a National Historic Person by the federal government
- 1990: Taché's house in Montmagny was designated a National Historic Site by the Canadian Register of Historic Places

== Works ==
- Quelques réflexions sur l'organisation des volontaires et de la milice de cette province, par un vétéran de 1812 (Quebec 1863)

== See also ==
1st Parliament of the Province of Canada

== Notes ==
Political offices
Preceded by Sir Augustin-Norbert Morin	Joint premiers of the Province of Canada - Canada East; 1855–1857 (with Sir Allan McNab, 1855–1856, and Sir John A. Macdonald, 1856–1857)	Succeeded by Sir George-Étienne Cartier
Preceded by Antoine-Aimé Dorion	Joint premiers of the Province of Canada - Canada East; 1864–1865 (with Sir John A. Macdonald)	Succeeded by Sir Narcisse-Fortunat Belleau
