= Section 17 of the Constitution Act, 1867 =

Provision of the Constitution of Canada

British North America Act, 1867

Section 17 of the Constitution Act, 1867 (French: article 17 de la Loi constitutionnelle de 1867) is the provision of the Constitution of Canada which created the federal Parliament of Canada. The Parliament is composed of the King of Canada; the appointed upper house, the Senate of Canada; and the elected lower house, the House of Commons of Canada. Political power rests mainly with the elected House of Commons.

The Constitution Act, 1867 is the constitutional statute which established Canada. Originally named the British North America Act, 1867, the Act continues to be the foundational statute for the Constitution of Canada, although it has been amended many times since 1867. It is now recognised as part of the supreme law of Canada.

== Constitution Act, 1867 ==
The Constitution Act, 1867 is part of the Constitution of Canada and thus part of the supreme law of Canada. The Act sets out the constitutional framework of Canada, including the structure of the federal government and the powers of the federal government and the provinces. It was the product of extensive negotiations between the provinces of British North America at the Charlottetown Conference in 1864, the Quebec Conference in 1864, and the London Conference in 1866. Those conferences were followed by consultations with the British government in 1867. The Act was then enacted in 1867 by the British Parliament under the name the British North America Act, 1867. In 1982 the Act was brought under full Canadian control through the Patriation of the Constitution, and was renamed the Constitution Act, 1867. Since Patriation the Act can only be amended in Canada, under the amending formula set out in the Constitution Act, 1982.

== Text of section 17 ==
Section 17 reads:

Constitution of Parliament of Canada
17 There shall be One Parliament for Canada, consisting of the Queen, an Upper House styled the Senate, and the House of Commons.

Section 17 is found in Part IV of the Constitution Act, 1867, dealing with the federal legislative power.

== Legislative history ==
This provision went through a number of changes in the legislative process. The first version, set out in the Quebec Resolutions, read:

6. There shall be a General Legislature or Parliament for the Federated Provinces, composed of a Legislative Council and a House of Commons.

Two years later, the version adopted at the London Conference added the monarch:

6. There shall be a General Legislature or Parliament for the Confederation, composed of the Sovereign, a Legislative Council, and a House of Commons.

In the first rough draft of the bill, the equivalent provision was modelled on the London Resolution version, and included the monarch, but in the next draft, the monarch was omitted. In the third draft, the monarch was again included and the Legislative Council re-named the Senate:

10. From and after the Union, there shall be within and for the Kingdom of Canada, one General Parliament, which shall be composed of the Queen, an Upper Chamber to be called the Senate, and a House of Commons.

The provision did not take its current form until the final draft, prior to the introduction of the bill in the British Parliament.

Section 17 has not been amended since the Act was enacted in 1867. The reference to "the Queen" does not change when the monarch is a king.

== Purpose and interpretation ==
Section 17 establishes a bicameral parliament, modelled on the British Parliament. The King's role is primarily ceremonial, although his assent is necessary for a bill passed by the two houses of Parliament to become law. His role is almost invariably performed by the King's representative, the Governor General of Canada, on his behalf.

The upper house, the Senate, is an appointed body. The senators are allocated by regions, with the Maritime region, Quebec region, Ontario region, and Western region each having twenty-six senators. Newfoundland and Labrador and the three territories are not part of any region. Newfoundland and Labrador has six senators, and each territory has one senator. Senators are appointed by the Governor General on the advice of the prime minister of Canada, and serve until age 75.

The seats in the lower house, the House of Commons, are allocated amongst the provinces, roughly based on population. The members of the House of Commons are elected on the basis of single-member constituencies (popularly called ridings), on a first-past-the-post basis. Elections are generally held every four years, but can be held more frequently if there is a minority government.

The Senate and the House of Commons have almost identical legislative powers. The only difference between the two is that appropriation and tax bills must originate in the House of Commons. However, the House of Commons is the dominant house, since it has greater democratic legitimacy than the appointed Senate. Under the principles of responsible government, the prime minister and federal cabinet are responsible to the House of Commons, and must maintain the confidence of the Commons.

== Related provisions of the Constitution Act, 1867 ==
The composition of the Senate is set out in sections 21 to 36 of the Act.

The composition of the House of Commons is set out in sections 37 to 52 of the Act.

Specific provisions about the passage of types of legislation, the monarch’s power to give royal assent to bills, and the possibility of reservation or disallowance of bills, are set out in sections 53 to 57 of the Act.

Section 91 of the Act sets out the major areas of legislative jurisdiction of the federal Parliament.

Paragraph 93(4) of the Act gives the federal Parliament a power to enact laws to protect rights of religious minorities (Protestant or Roman Catholic) with respect to publicly funded separate schools.

Section 94 of the Act gives the federal Parliament the power to enact uniform laws for Ontario, Nova Scotia and New Brunswick.

Section 94A of the Act gives the federal Parliament the power to enact laws relating to old age pensions and related benefits.

Section 95 of the Act gives the federal Parliament the power to enact laws relating to agriculture and immigration.

Section 101 of the Act gives the federal Parliament the power to create the Supreme Court of Canada and other federal courts.
