= Section 55 of the Constitution Act, 1867 =

Provision of the Constitution of Canada

British North America Act, 1867

Section 55 of the Constitution Act, 1867 (French: article 55 de la Loi constitutionnelle de 1867) is a provision of the Constitution of Canada relating to the power of the Governor General of Canada to give royal assent to a bill passed by the federal houses of Parliament. It also contains the former power of the governor general to reserve a bill for the consideration of the British government. The provision no longer has any effect, as a result of the growth of Canadian autonomy and constitutional conventions in the 20th century.

The power in section 55 also applies indirectly to the provinces. Section 90 of the act provides that the provision respecting the assent to bills also applies to provincial bills.

The Constitution Act, 1867 is the constitutional statute which established Canada. Originally named the British North America Act, 1867, the act continues to be the foundational statute for the Constitution of Canada, although it has been amended many times since 1867. It is now recognised as part of the supreme law of Canada.

== Constitution Act, 1867 ==
The Constitution Act, 1867 is part of the Constitution of Canada and thus part of the "supreme law of Canada". The act sets out the constitutional framework of Canada, including the structure of the federal government and the powers of the federal government and the provinces. It was the product of extensive negotiations between the provinces of British North America at the Charlottetown Conference in 1864, the Quebec Conference in 1864, and the London Conference in 1866. Those conferences were followed by consultations with the British government in 1867. The act was then enacted by the British Parliament under the name the British North America Act, 1867. In 1982 the act was brought under full Canadian control through the Patriation of the Constitution, and was renamed the Constitution Act, 1867. Since Patriation, the act can only be amended in Canada, under the amending formula set out in the Constitution Act, 1982.

== Text of section 55 ==
Section 55 reads:

Royal Assent to Bills, &c.
55 Where a Bill passed by the Houses of the Parliament is presented to the Governor General for the Queen's Assent, he shall declare, according to his Discretion, but subject to the Provisions of this Act and to Her Majesty's Instructions, either that he assents thereto in the Queen's Name, or that he withholds the Queen's Assent, or that he reserves the Bill for the Signification of the Queen's Pleasure.

Section 55 is found in Part IV of the Constitution Act, 1867, dealing with the legislative power of the federal Parliament. It has not been amended since the Act was enacted in 1867. However, the reservation power contained in this section has been negated by constitutional conventions developed in the 20th century, with the growth of Canadian autonomy.

== Legislative history ==
Section 55 traces its origins back to section 37 of the Union Act, 1840, the constituent statute of the Province of Canada, which dealt with this issue:

XXXVII And be it enacted, That whenever any Bill which has been passed by the Legislative Council and Assembly of the Province of Canada shall be presented for Her Majesty’s Assent to the Governor of the said Province, such Governor shall declare, according to his Discretion, but subject nevertheless to the Provisions contained in this Act, and to such Instructions as may from Time to Time be given in that Behalf by Her Majesty, Her Heirs or Successors, that he assents to such Bill in Her Majesty’s Name, or that he withholds Her Majesty’s Assent, or that he reserves such Bill for the Signification of Her Majesty’s Pleasure thereon.

The delegates to the Quebec Conference and the London Conference agreed that the monarch would continue to have the power to consider bills reserved by the governor. The Quebec Resolutions provided that bills could be reserved "in the usual manner" for assent by the queen. The London Resolutions used the same phrase.

After the London Conference approved the London Resolutions, it appointed a committee of the four provincial attorneys general to prepare the first draft of the proposed bill. (Note: The four attorneys general were John A. Macdonald, Canada West; George-Étienne Cartier, Canada East; William Alexander Henry, Nova Scotia; and Charles Fisher, New Brunswick.) This rough draft used the language of section XXXVII of the Union Act, 1840 as the basis for the reservation power. Minor stylistic changes were made in subsequent drafts. The wording of the clause was settled in the final draft of the bill.

== Purpose and interpretation ==
=== Historical origins ===
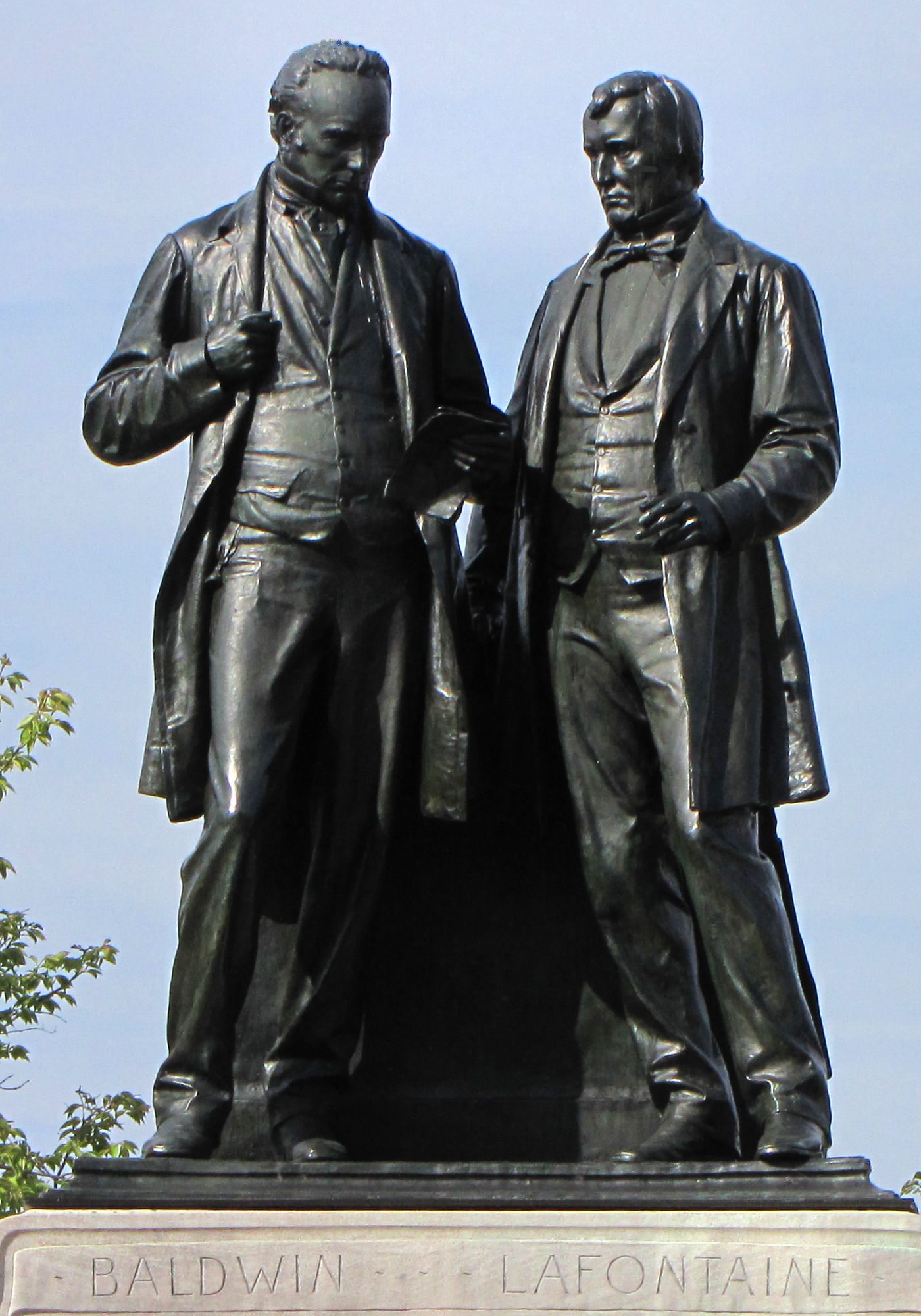
Parliament Hill monument to Baldwin and Lafontaine, who established responsible government in the Province of Canada

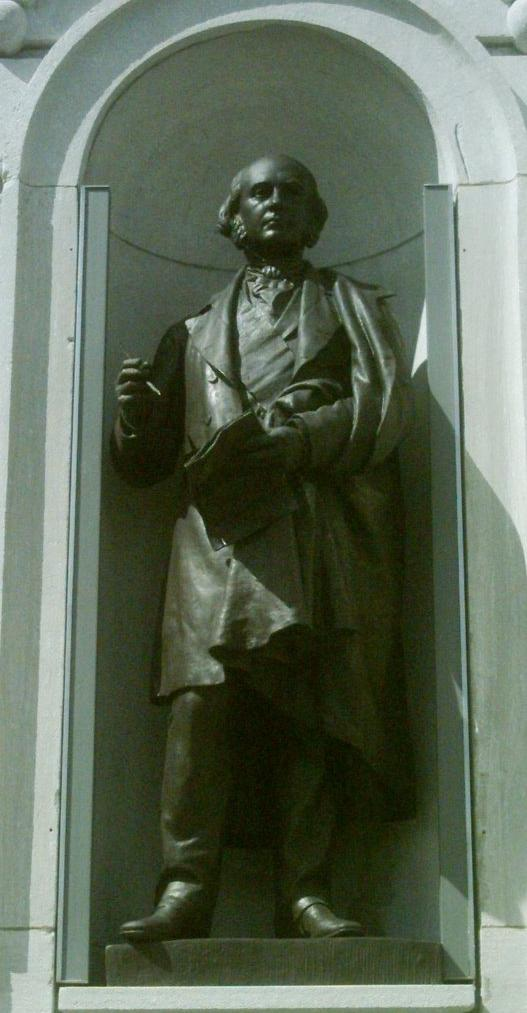
Statue of Governor General Lord Elgin, who gave royal assent to the Rebellion Losses Bill on the advice of Lafontaine and Baldwin, at the Quebec Parliament Building

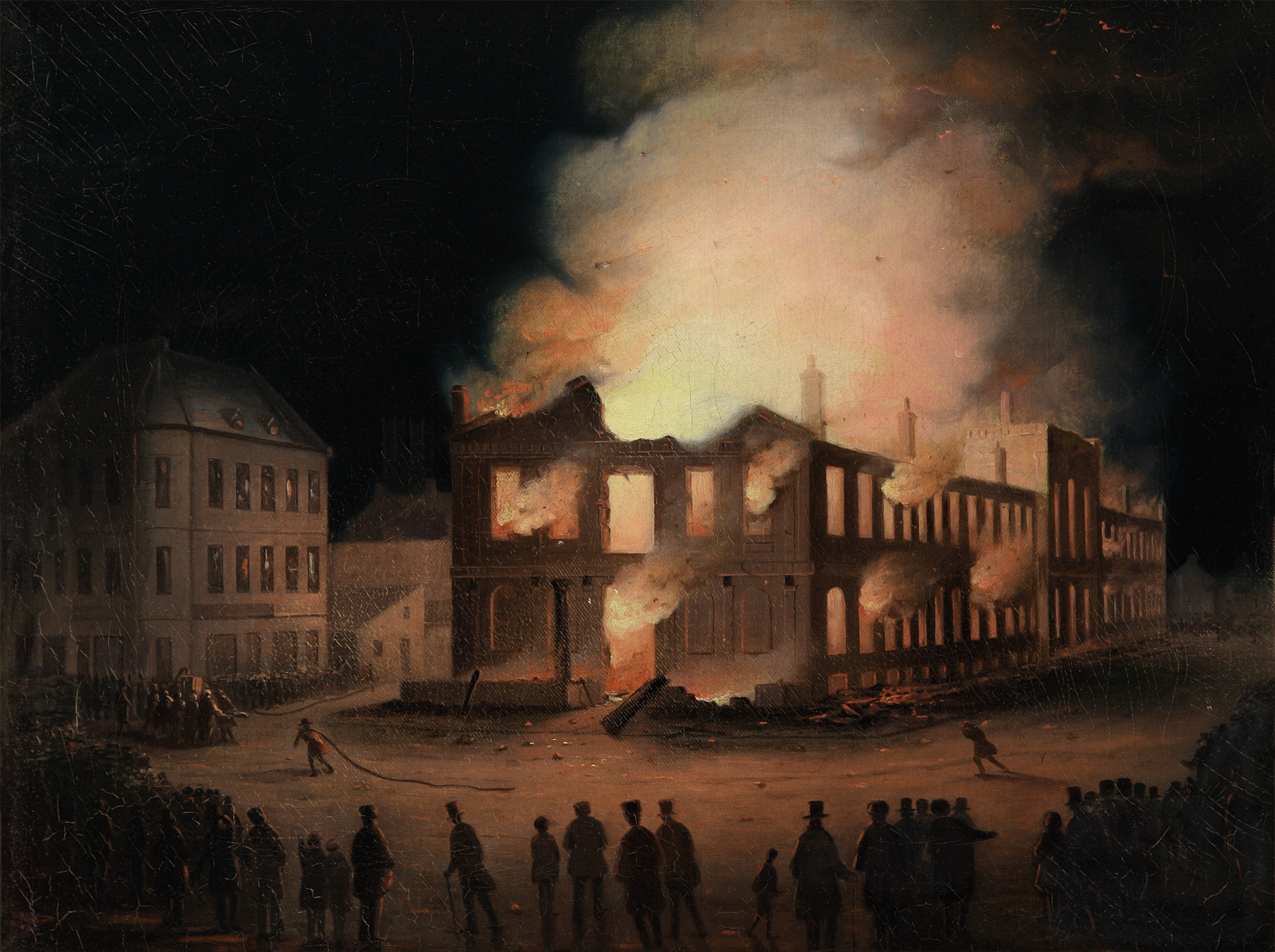
Burning of the Parliament building, 1849, after Lord Elgin gave royal assent to the Rebellion Losses Bill

During the colonial period, the local legislatures were based on the model of the British Parliament. Royal assent to a bill was required for each bill passed by the colonial legislatures. The colonial governors had the power to grant or withhold royal assent on behalf of the monarch. If a governor granted royal assent to a bill passed by a colonial legislature, it became law. If the governor refused royal assent, the bill died.

In addition to granting or withholding royal assent, the colonial governors had a third option: they could reserve a bill for consideration by the monarch, in effect, the British government, which could consider whether the bill was consistent with British colonial policy. The British government could advise the monarch to grant or refuse royal assent to a reserved bill.

When responsible government was established in the British North American provinces (starting with Nova Scotia in 1848), the governors effectively lost the power to deny royal assent. Under the principles of responsible government, the governors would only exercise their powers on the advice of the elected government. In theory they retained the power to deny royal assent, but by constitutional convention, if a bill was passed by the houses of a legislature, the governor normally granted royal assent, since the bill expressed the wishes of the elected representatives.

This principle was established in the Province of Canada in 1849, when Governor General Lord Elgin granted royal assent to the controversial Rebellion Losses Bill. The bill was passed by both houses of the Parliament of the Province of Canada, as a measure proposed by the government of Louis-Hippolyte Lafontaine (co-premier from Canada East) and Robert Baldwin (co-premier from Canada West). The bill was to compensate residents of Canada East (now Quebec) who had suffered property losses during the Lower Canada Rebellion of 1837–1838.

The Tory opposition members of the Parliament strongly opposed the measure, arguing that it compensated disloyal French-Canadians, even though a similar bill had been passed a few years earlier to compensate residents of Canada West (now Ontario) who had suffered property losses during the similar Upper Canada Rebellion. The Tory opposition members called on Lord Elgin to deny royal assent.

When Lord Elgin instead granted royal assent, on the advice of the LaFontaine-Baldwin government, riots broke out in Montreal, where Parliament met, and the parliament building was burnt by the rioters. Nonetheless, the principle was established that the governors would grant royal assent to bills passed by the legislature. The only exception was if the governor considered the bill should be reserved for consideration by the British government, under the instructions the British government gave to the governor on appointment.

=== Application to federal acts of Parliament ===
Section 17 of the Act provides that the monarch is part of the federal Parliament, and section 91 of the Act provides that the monarch is part of the legislative process for federal laws. The monarch's assent is therefore necessary for a bill passed by the House of Commons and the Senate to become law. As set out in section 55, the Governor General carries out the function of granting royal assent, but under the principles of responsible government, the Governor General grants royal assent as a matter of course.

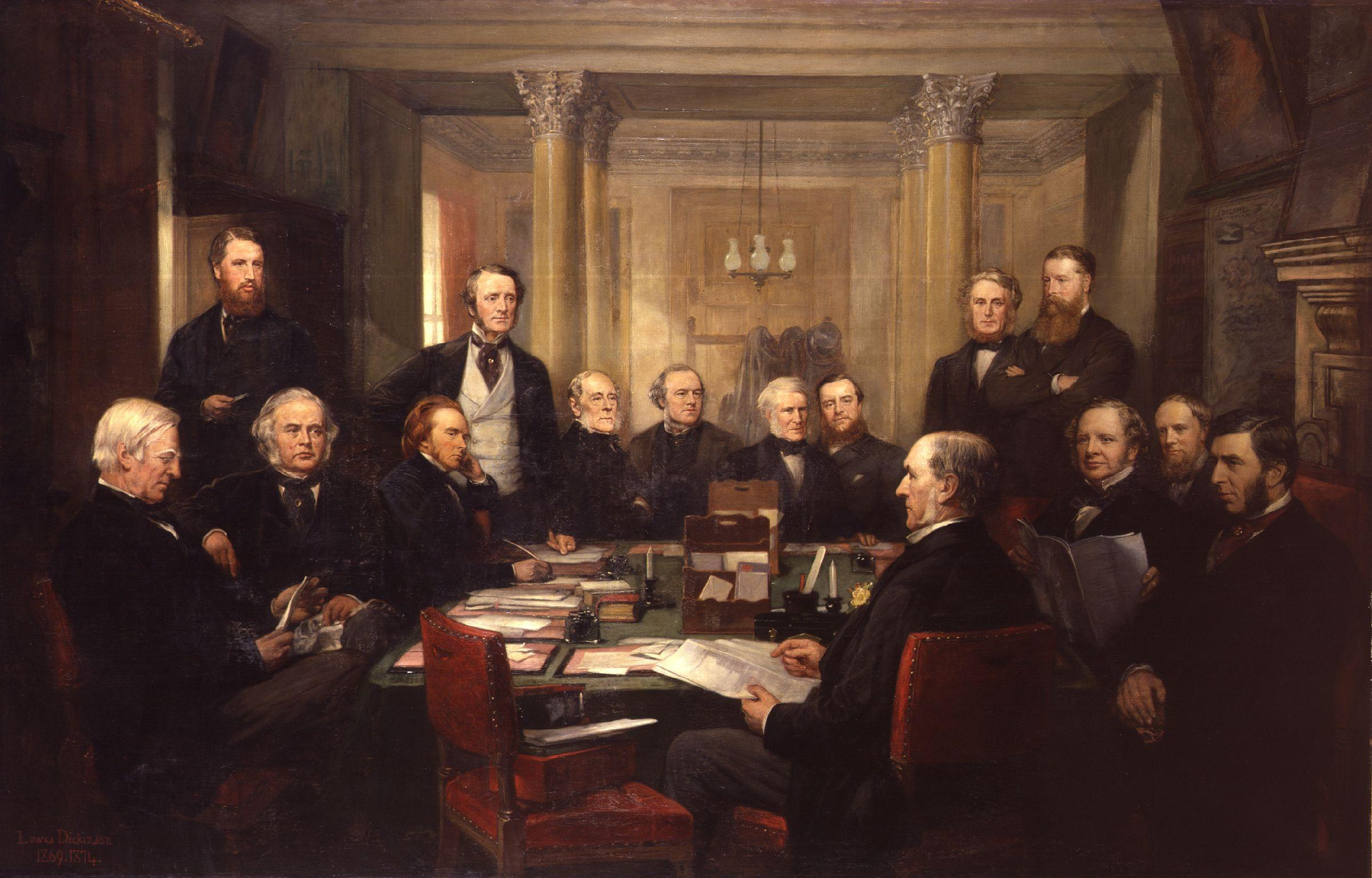
The British Cabinet in 1868, which had the power to deny royal assent to federal bills reserved by the Governor General

However, when the Constitution Act, 1867 was passed, the Governor General was considered to be an officer of the British government, carrying out British imperial policies. Section 55 continued the power of reservation, giving the Governor General the power to reserve a federal bill for the consideration of the British government. If the Governor General reserved a bill, the monarch then could grant or deny royal assent, under section 57 of the Act, acting on the advice of the British government.

The power to reserve a federal bill was only exercised in the early days of Confederation, between 1867 and 1878. During that time, the governors general reserved twenty-one federal bills for consideration by the British government. Of the twenty-one bills reserved, six were denied royal assent. In 1878, as a result of lobbying by the Canadian government, the British government changed the instructions it gave to the Governor General, removing instructions to reserve certain classes of bills. No federal bills have been reserved since then.

=== Effect of the Balfour Declaration ===
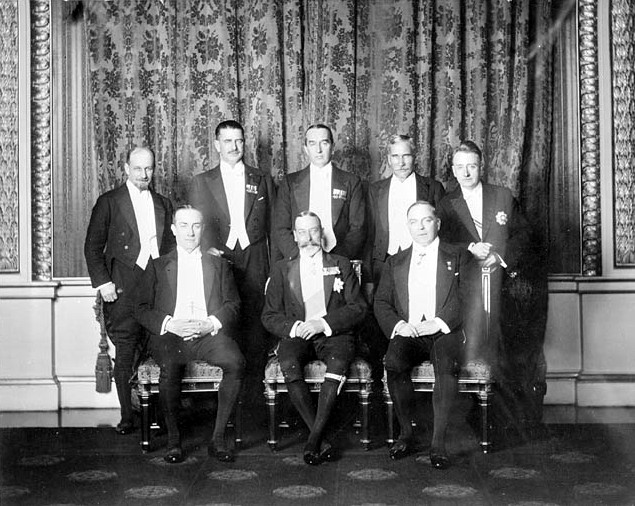
King George V and the prime ministers of the United Kingdom and the Dominions at the Imperial Conference of 1926, which adopted the Balfour Declaration

As Canada developed its own identity, Canadian autonomy became more and more established, and the role of the Governor General as an officer of the British government diminished. Finally, with the Balfour Declaration of 1926, the British and Dominion governments agreed that the constitutional position had changed. The United Kingdom and the Dominions were now equal in status:

They are autonomous Communities within the British Empire, equal in status, in no way subordinate one to another in any aspect of their domestic or external affairs, though united by a common allegiance to the Crown, and freely associated as members of the British Commonwealth of Nations.

The Conference went on to conclude that the changed status of the Dominions mean that the governors general were no longer to be considered officers of the British government. Instead, the governors general were recognised as fulfilling the role of the monarch in each Dominion, acting under the principles of responsible government, and only taking advice from the Dominion government, not from the British government.

With this change in the role of the Governor General, the provision for reservation of a bill for the monarch's consideration ceased to have any political justification. Based on the Balfour Declaration, three years later the British and Dominion governments agreed that the British government would no longer instruct the governors general to reserve bills. Since the Governor General of Canada now takes advice solely from the federal Cabinet, and grants royal assent on the advice of the federal Cabinet, there is no likelihood that the federal Cabinet would advise the Governor General to reserve royal assent to a bill passed by both houses of Parliament.

The reservation power with respect to federal bills has thus been nullified by constitutional convention. Although the power of reservation of federal bills is still mentioned in sections 55 and 57, it is now anachronistic.

== Difference from disallowance of acts ==
The power to reserve a bill under section 55 is different from the power of disallowance under section 56 of the Act.

Under the reservation power in section 55, the Governor General would neither grant nor deny royal assent, and the bill would not become law. The Governor General would instead forward the bill to London for consideration by the British government, and the monarch could grant or withhold royal assent under section 57 of the Act, on the advice of the British government. Unless the monarch granted royal assent, the bill never had force of law.

The disallowance power in section 56 applied to acts to which the Governor General had granted royal assent. Once royal assent is given, a bill becomes an act of Parliament and has force of law. The Governor General was required to forward all acts to London, and the British government then had up to two years to decide whether to disallow an act. If the monarch disallowed the act on the advice of the British government, it would cease to have force of law.

== Application to the provinces ==
Section 55 only refers to the reservation power of the governor general with respect to federal bills. However, it applies indirectly to the provinces, by means of section 90 of the act, which adapts the reservation power to provincial bills.

== Proposals for repeal ==
With the movement toward Patriation in the 1970s onwards, there have been proposals to abolish the reservation power by removing it from section 55. The Victoria Charter, 1971, was a proposal for patriation which included the abolition of the reservation power, but it was not enacted. The final Patriation package, set out in the Constitution Act, 1982, did not include the abolition of the reservation power and did not repeal section 55. There was also a proposal to repeal section 55 in the Charlottetown Accord in 1992, but the Accord was defeated in a national referendum.

== Related provisions of the Constitution Act, 1867 ==
Section 17 of the Act provides that the federal Parliament is composed of the monarch, the Senate and the House of Commons.

Section 56 of the Act sets out the power of the British government to disallow laws passed by the Parliament of Canada.

Section 57 of the Act sets out the power of the British monarch-in-council to grant royal assent to federal bills which the Governor General has reserved.

Section 90 of the Act applies the powers set out in section 55, section 56 and section 57 to the provincial governments, with the necessary adjustments in terminology.
