= Section 56 of the Constitution Act, 1867 =

Provision of the Constitution of Canada

British North America Act, 1867

Section 56 of the Constitution Act, 1867 (French: article 56 de la Loi constitutionnelle de 1867) is a provision of the Constitution of Canada which previously set out the power of the British government to disallow laws passed by the Parliament of Canada. This power was only used once and no longer exists. The British government gave up the power as a result of the Balfour Declaration of 1926, which recognised Canada and the other British Dominions as equals of the United Kingdom.

The disallowance power in section 56 also applies indirectly to the provinces. Section 90 of the act provides that the provision respecting the disallowance of acts also applies to provincial laws. There is ambiguity whether the power still exists in relation to the provinces.

The Constitution Act, 1867 is the constitutional statute which established Canada. Originally named the British North America Act, 1867, the Act continues to be the foundational statute for the Constitution of Canada, although it has been amended many times since 1867. It is now recognised as part of the supreme law of Canada.

== Constitution Act, 1867 ==
The Constitution Act, 1867 is part of the Constitution of Canada and thus part of the supreme law of Canada. It was the product of extensive negotiations by the governments of the British North American provinces at three separate conferences in the 1860s. Following those conferences, there were consultations with the British government in 1867. The act sets out the basic constitutional structure of Canada, creating the federal government and defining the powers of the federal government and the provinces. It was enacted in 1867 by the British Parliament under the name of the British North America Act, 1867.

The act did not include any power for it to be amended in Canada, so amendments had to be made by the British Parliament at the request of the Canadian Parliament. That remained the case until Patriation of the Constitution in 1982, when the act was brought under full Canadian control and was renamed the Constitution Act, 1867. Since 1982, the act can only be amended in Canada under the amending formula set out in the Constitution Act, 1982.

== Text of section 56 ==
Section 56 reads:

Disallowance by Order in Council of Act assented to by Governor General
56 Where the Governor General assents to a Bill in the Queen's Name, he shall by the first convenient Opportunity send an authentic Copy of the Act to One of Her Majesty's Principal Secretaries of State, and if the Queen in Council within Two Years after Receipt thereof by the Secretary of State thinks fit to disallow the Act, such Disallowance (with a Certificate of the Secretary of State of the Day on which the Act was received by him) being signified by the Governor General, by Speech or Message to each of the Houses of the Parliament or by Proclamation, shall annul the Act from and after the Day of such Signification.

Section 56 is found in Part IV of the Constitution Act, 1867, dealing with the legislative power of the federal Parliament. It has not been amended since the Act was enacted in 1867. However, its application has been negated by constitutional conventions developed in the 20th century, with the growth of Canadian autonomy.

== Legislative history ==
Section 56 traces its origins back to section 38 of the Union Act, 1840, the constituent statute of the Province of Canada, which dealt with this issue:

XXXVIII And be it enacted, That whenever any Bill which shall have been presented for Her Majesty's Assent to the Governor of the said Province of Canada shall by such Governor have been assented to in Her Majesty's Name, such Governor shall by the first convenient Opportunity transmit to One of Her Majesty's Principal Secretaries of State an authentic Copy of such Bill so assented to; and that it shall be lawful, at any Time within Two Years after such Bill shall have been so received by such Secretary of State, for Her Majesty, by Order in Council, to declare Her Disallowance of such Bill; and that such Disallowance, together with a Certificate under the Hand and Seal of such Secretary of State, certifying the Day on which such Bill was received as aforesaid, being signified by such Governor to the Legislative Council and Assembly of Canada, by Speech or Message to the Legislative Council and Assembly of the said Province, or by Proclamation, shall make void and annul the same from and after the Day of such Signification.

The delegates to the Quebec Conference and the London Conference agreed that the monarch would continue to have the power to disallow statutes passed by the federal Parliament. The Quebec Resolutions provided that acts could be disallowed "as in the case of bills passed ... hitherto". The London Resolutions used the same phrase.

After the London Conference approved the London Resolutions, it appointed a committee of the four provincial attorneys general to prepare the first draft of the proposed bill. (Note: The four attorneys general were John A. Macdonald, Canada West; George-Étienne Cartier, Canada East; William Alexander Henry, Nova Scotia; and Charles Fisher, New Brunswick.) This rough draft used the language of section 38 of the Union Act, 1840 as the basis for the disallowance power. The clause was then reworded in the initial draft of the bill, taking the form eventually adopted.

== Purpose and interpretation ==
=== Colonial origins ===
Under British colonial law prior to Confederation, the Crown in Britain held the power to annul a statute passed by a colonial legislature, commonly called "disallowance". The Crown would exercise this power on the advice of the British government, if the colonial law was considered contrary to the policies of the British government, or if the statute exceeded the powers granted to the colonial legislature.

=== Situation at Confederation ===
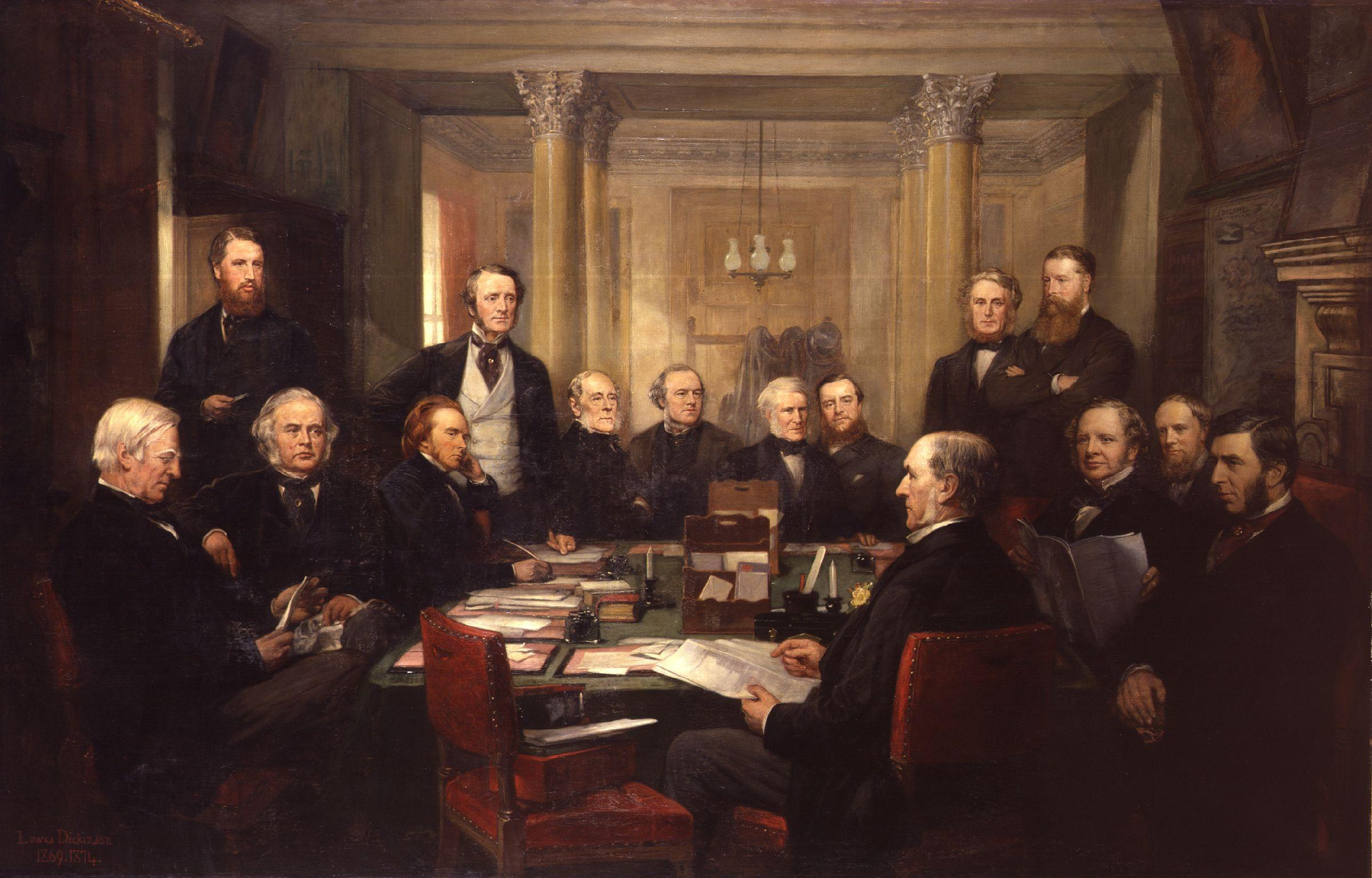
The British Cabinet in 1868

When Canada was created in 1867, this imperial power was carried forward by section 56, which required the Governor General of Canada to forward copies of all statutes passed by the federal Parliament to one of the British cabinet ministers, typically the Colonial Secretary. The British government then had up to two years to review the statutes, and to advise the monarch whether to disallow any of the statutes. This authority was to ensure the Canadian Parliament stayed within its constitutional authority, and did not pass any statutes that were contrary to British imperial policy. A statute that was disallowed nonetheless was considered to have been in force during the period from royal assent by the Governor General, until the Governor General gave formal notice of disallowance to the House of Commons and the Senate.

=== Disallowance of the Oaths Act ===
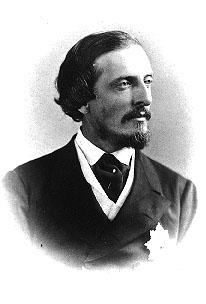
Governor General Dufferin, whose request for advice resulted in the disallowance of the Oaths Act

Only one federal statute, the Oaths Act, 1873, was ever disallowed under section 56. The British government disallowed the act because the law officers of the Crown concluded that the Oaths Act was unconstitutional. In their view, the act exceeded the power of the Parliament of Canada to regulate parliamentary proceedings under section 18 of the Act, as that section read at that time.

The Oaths Act arose from the Pacific Scandal that brought down the Conservative government of Prime Minister Macdonald in 1873. The scandal involved allegations that a business group vying for the contract to build the transcontinental railway to the Pacific coast had bribed members of the Conservative government in the 1872 election campaign. When the scandal broke, the opposition in the House of Commons called for a parliamentary inquiry, with the power to compel testimony under oath. Macdonald agreed to the passage of the Oaths Act, but indicated that he had doubts about its constitutionality.

Governor General Lord Dufferin forwarded the act and various legal opinions to the British government for advice. On May 29, 1873, the colonial secretary, the Earl of Kimberley, sent a telegram to Dufferin, advising that the Law Officers had concluded that the act was ultra vires, i.e. beyond the constitutional authority of the federal Parliament. The next month, Kimberley sent a second telegram, advising that the act had been disallowed.

=== Effect of the Balfour Declaration, 1926 ===
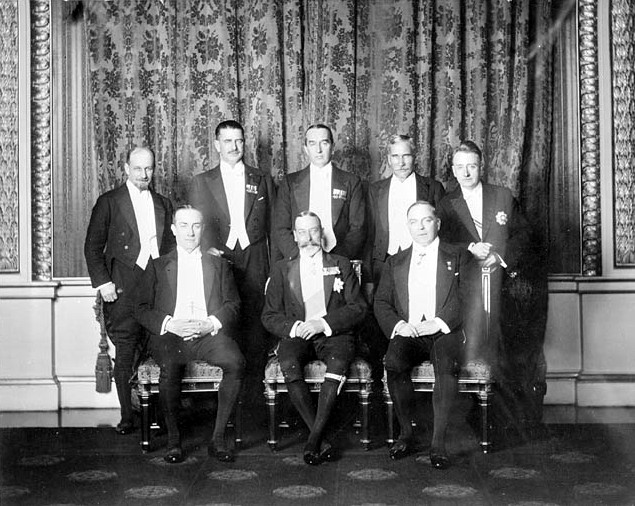
King George V and the prime ministers of the United Kingdom and the Dominions at the Imperial Conference of 1926, which adopted the Balfour Declaration

As Canada developed its own identity, Canadian autonomy became more and more established, and the role of the Governor General as an officer of the British government diminished. Finally, with the Balfour Declaration of 1926, the British and Dominion governments agreed that the constitutional position had changed. The United Kingdom and the Dominions were equals for all purposes:

They are autonomous Communities within the British Empire, equal in status, in no way subordinate one to another in any aspect of their domestic or external affairs, though united by a common allegiance to the Crown, and freely associated as members of the British Commonwealth of Nations.

With this recognition of equal status, the policy basis for the power of the British government to disallow a Dominion statute disappeared. Based on the Balfour Declaration, three years later the British and Dominion governments agreed that the power of disallowance would no longer be used. The disallowance power with respect to federal acts of Parliament has been nullified by the constitutional convention, even though section 56 continues to refer to it.

== Difference from reservation of bills ==
The power to disallow an act under section 56 was different from the power of reservation of bills under section 55 of the Act.

The disallowance power in section 56 applied to acts to which the Governor General had granted royal assent. Once royal assent is given, a bill becomes an act of Parliament and has force of law. The Governor General was required to forward all acts to the monarch, and the monarch then had up to two years to disallow any act, on the advice of the British government. If the monarch disallowed the act, it ceased to have force of law.

Under the reservation power in section 55, the Governor General did not grant or refuse royal assent, so the bill did not become law. Instead, the Governor General would forward the bill to the monarch for their consideration. The monarch could grant or refuse royal assent under section 57 of the Act, on the advice of the British government. Unless the monarch granted royal assent, a reserved bill never had force of law.

== Application to provinces ==
Section 56 only refers to the disallowance power of the Governor General with respect to federal acts. However, it applies indirectly to the provinces, by means of section 90 of the act, which adapts the disallowance power to provincial acts.

== Proposals for repeal ==
With the movement toward Patriation in the 1970s onwards, there have been proposals to abolish the disallowance power by repealing section 56. The Victoria Charter, 1971, was a proposal for patriation which included the abolition of the disallowance power, but it was not enacted. The final Patriation package, set out in the Constitution Act, 1982, did not include the abolition of the disallowance power and did not repeal section 56. There was also a proposal to repeal section 56 in the Charlottetown Accord in 1992, but the Accord was defeated in a national referendum.

== Related provisions ==
Section 17 of the Act provides that the federal Parliament is composed of the monarch, the Senate and the House of Commons.

Section 55 of the Act sets out the power of the Governor General to grant or refuse royal assent to bills passed by the two houses of the federal Parliament, and the former power to reserve a bill for the consideration of the British government.

Section 57 of the Act required the Governor General to forward reserved bills for the consideration of the British government, and set out the power of the monarch to grant royal assent to a reserved bill, on the advice of the British government.

Section 90 of the Act applies the powers set out in section 55, section 56 and section 57 to the provincial governments, with the necessary adjustments in terminology.
