= Section 52 =

Section 52 may refer to:

- Section 52 of the Constitution of Australia
- Section 52 of the Constitution Act, 1867 in Canada
- Section 52, a Petaling Jaya city section, Malaysia
