= Section 57 of the Constitution Act, 1867 =

Provision of the Constitution of Canada

British North America Act, 1867

Section 57 of the Constitution Act, 1867 (French: article 57 de la Loi constitutionnelle de 1867) is a provision of the Constitution of Canada relating to the former power of the Governor General of Canada to reserve a bill passed by the two houses of the Parliament of Canada for consideration by the British government. The section gives the Governor General the power to advise of the monarch's decision on bills that have been reserved. The provision no longer has any effect, as a result of the growth of Canadian autonomy and constitutional conventions in the 20th century.

The power in section 57 also applies indirectly to the provinces. Section 90 of the act provides that the provision respecting the signification of decisions on reserved bills also applies to provincial legislation.

The Constitution Act, 1867 is the constitutional statute which established Canada. Originally named the British North America Act, 1867, the Act continues to be the foundational statute for the Constitution of Canada, although it has been amended many times since 1867. It is now recognised as part of the supreme law of Canada.

== Constitution Act, 1867 ==
The Constitution Act, 1867 is part of the Constitution of Canada and thus part of the supreme law of Canada. It was the product of extensive negotiations by the governments of the British North American provinces at three separate conferences in the 1860s. Following those conferences, there were consultations with the British government in 1867. The act sets out the basic constitutional structure of Canada, creating the federal government and defining the powers of the federal government and the provinces. It was enacted in 1867 by the British Parliament under the name of the British North America Act, 1867.

The act did not include any power for it to be amended in Canada, so amendments had to be made by the British Parliament at the request of the Canadian Parliament. That remained the case until Patriation of the Constitution in 1982, when the act was brought under full Canadian control and was renamed the Constitution Act, 1867. Since 1982, the act can only be amended in Canada under the amending formula set out in the Constitution Act, 1982.

== Text of section 57 ==
Section 57 reads:

Signification of Queen's Pleasure on Bill reserved
57 A Bill reserved for the Signification of the Queen's Pleasure shall not have any Force unless and until, within Two Years from the Day on which it was presented to the Governor General for the Queen's Assent, the Governor General signifies, by Speech or Message to each of the Houses of the Parliament or by Proclamation, that it has received the Assent of the Queen in Council.

An Entry of every such Speech, Message, or Proclamation shall be made in the Journal of each House, and a Duplicate thereof duly attested shall be delivered to the proper Officer to be kept among the Records of Canada.

Section 57 is found in Part IV of the Constitution Act, 1867, dealing with the legislative power of the federal Parliament. It has not been amended since the Act was enacted in 1867. However, its application has been negated by constitutional conventions developed in the 20th century, with the growth of Canadian autonomy.

== Legislative history ==
Section 57 traces its origins back to section 39 of the Union Act, 1840, the constituent statute of the Province of Canada, which dealt with this issue:

XXXIX That no Bill which shall be reserved for the Signification of Her Majesty's Pleasure thereon shall have any Force or Authority within the Province of Canada until the Governor of the said Province shall signify, either by Speech or Message to the Legislative Council and Assembly of the said Province, or by Proclamation, that such Bill has been laid before Her Majesty in Council and that Her Majesty has been pleased to assent to the same; and that an Entry shall be made in the Journals of the said Legislative Council of every such Speech, Message, or Proclamation, and a Duplicate thereof, duly attested, shall be delivered to the proper Officer, to be kept among the Records of the said Province; and that no Bill which shall be so reserved as aforesaid shall have any Force or Authority in the said Province unless Her Majesty's Assent thereto shall have been so signified as aforesaid within the Space of Two Years from the Day on which such Bill shall have been presented for Her Majesty's Assent to the Governor as aforesaid.

The delegates to the Quebec Conference and the London Conference agreed that the practice of reservation by the Governor General for review by the monarch would continue to exist. The Quebec Resolutions provided that the Governor General could reserve a bill "in the usual manner for Her Majesty's assent" but did not provide any details about the procedure to be followed. The London Resolutions used the same phrase.

After the London Conference approved the London Resolutions, it appointed a committee of the four provincial attorneys general to prepare the first draft of the proposed bill. (Note: The four attorneys general were John A. Macdonald, Canada West; George-Étienne Cartier, Canada East; William Alexander Henry, Nova Scotia; and Charles Fisher, New Brunswick.) This rough draft used the language of section 38 of the Union Act, 1840 as the basis for the signification of the decision by the monarch on a reserved bill. The clause was then reworded in the initial draft of the bill, taking the form eventually adopted.

== Purpose and interpretation ==
=== Application to federal acts of Parliament ===
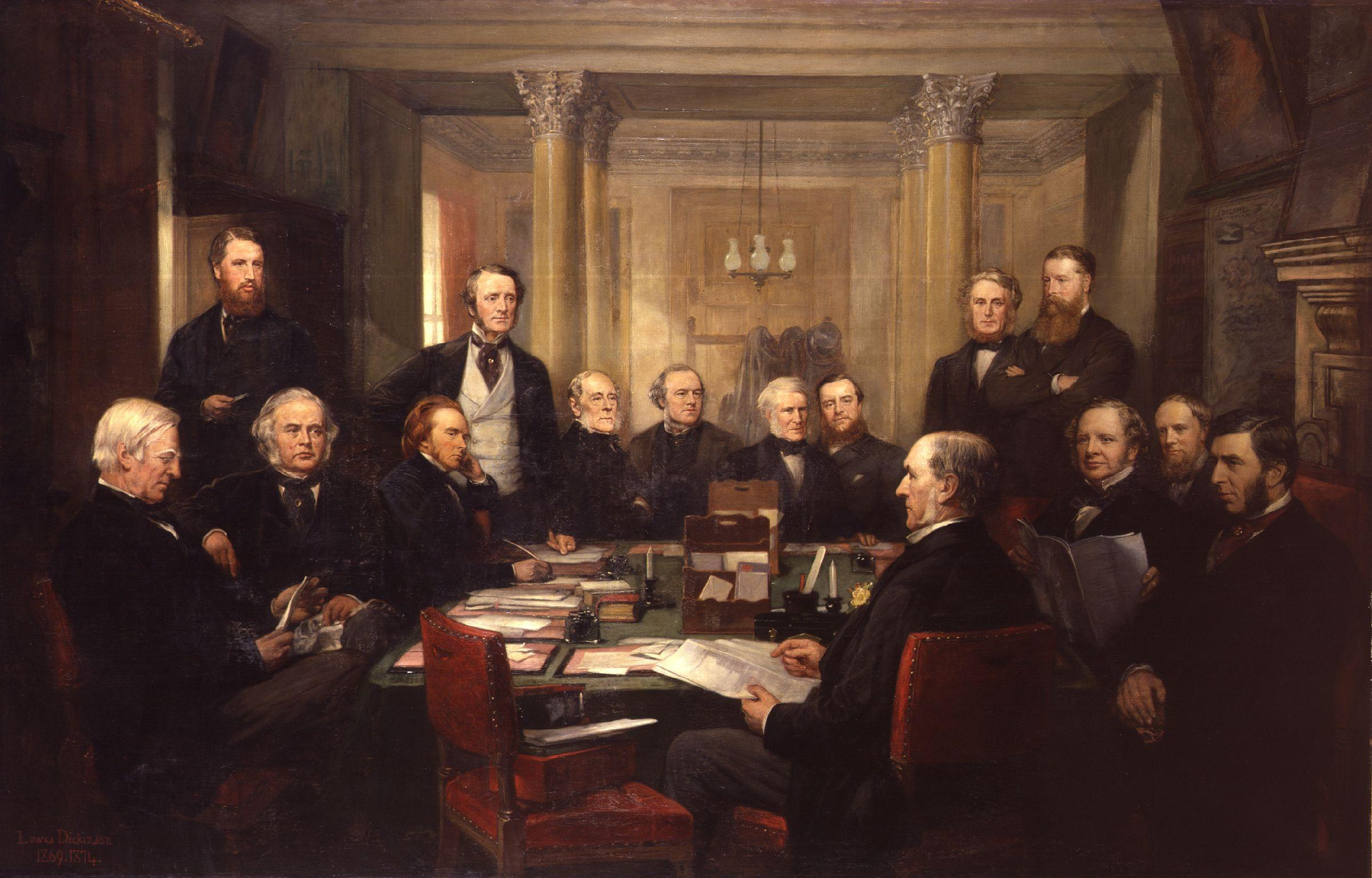
The British Cabinet in 1868, the year after the passage of the British North America Act, 1867, which gave the Cabinet the power to deny assent to a reserved federal bill

Section 57 sets out the procedural mechanism for the determination of reserved bills, as provided by section 55 of the Act. Under that section, the Governor General could choose to reserve a bill for the consideration of the monarch in council, namely the monarch acting on the advice of the British government. The British government would then have two years to decide what to do with the reserved bill. The government could advise the monarch to grant royal assent, in which case the bill would become law. Alternatively, the government could advise the monarch to refuse royal assent, in which case the bill would not become law.

If the British government advised the monarch to grant royal assent, the assent had to be given within the two-year period from the date the Governor General had reserved the bill. The Governor General then had to advise the two houses of Parliament that assent had been granted, also within that two year window.

This power was a carry-over from the traditional structure of the pre-Confederation colonial governments. The colonial governors could reserve a bill for consideration by the monarch (in effect, the British government), in case there were concerns that a bill did not come within the powers of the colonial government, or was contrary to a matter of British imperial policy. When Canada was created, the power of reservation was continued in section 55 of the Act.

=== Effect of the Balfour Declaration ===
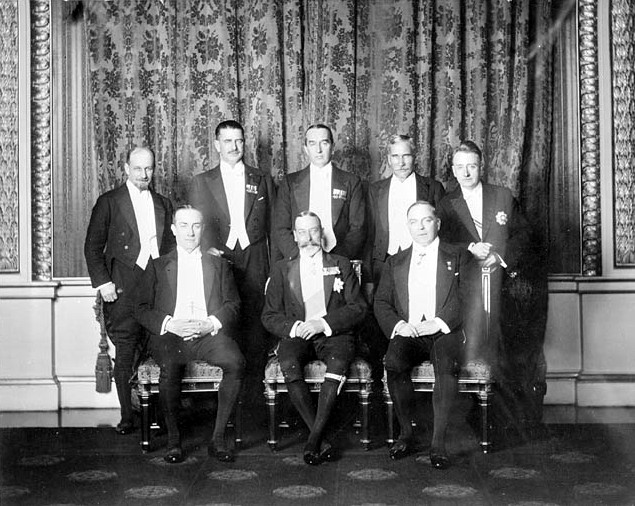
King George V and the prime ministers of the United Kingdom and the Dominions at the Imperial Conference of 1926, which adopted the Balfour Declaration

As Canada developed its own identity, Canadian autonomy became more and more established, and the role of the Governor General as an officer of the British government diminished. Finally, with the Balfour Declaration of 1926, the British and Dominion governments agreed that the constitutional position had changed. The United Kingdom and the Dominions were now equal in status:

They are autonomous Communities within the British Empire, equal in status, in no way subordinate one to another in any aspect of their domestic or external affairs, though united by a common allegiance to the Crown, and freely associated as members of the British Commonwealth of Nations.

The Conference went on to conclude that the changed status of the Dominions meant that the governors general were no longer considered officers of the British government. Instead, the governors general were recognised as fulfilling the role of the monarch in each Dominion, acting under the principles of responsible government, and only taking advice from the Dominion government, not from the British government.

With this change in the role of the Governor General, the provision for reservation of a bill for the monarch's consideration ceased to have any true political significance. Based on the Balfour Declaration, three years later the British and Dominion governments agreed that the British government would no longer instruct the governors general to reserve bills. Since the Governor General of Canada now takes advice solely from the federal Cabinet, and grants royal assent on the advice of the federal Cabinet, there is no likelihood that the federal Cabinet would advise the Governor General to reserve royal assent to a bill passed by both houses of Parliament.

The reservation power with respect to federal bills has thus been nullified by constitutional convention. Although the power of reservation of federal bills is still mentioned in sections 55 and 57, it is now anachronistic with respect to federal bills.

== Application to provinces ==
Section 56 only refers to the signification of outcome of reservations by the Governor General with respect to federal acts. However, the section applies indirectly to the provinces, by means of section 90 of the act, which adapts the reservation power to provincial acts.

== Proposals for repeal ==
With the movement toward Patriation in the 1970s onwards, there were proposals to abolish the reservation power and repeal section 57. The Victoria Charter, 1971, was a proposal for patriation which included the repeal of the reservation power, but it was not enacted. The final Patriation package, set out in the Constitution Act, 1982, did not include the abolition of the reservation power and did not repeal section 57. There was also a proposal to repeal section 57 in the Charlottetown Accord in 1992, but the Accord was defeated in a national referendum.

== Related provisions of the Constitution Act, 1867 ==
Section 17 of the Act provides that the federal Parliament is composed of the monarch, the Senate and the House of Commons.

Section 55 of the Act sets out the power of the Governor General to grant or refuse royal assent to bills passed by the two houses of the federal Parliament, or to reserve a bill for the consideration of the British Cabinet.

Section 56 of the Act sets out the former power of the British government to disallow laws passed by the Parliament of Canada.

Section 90 of the Act applies the powers set out in section 55, section 56 and section 57 to the provincial governments, with the necessary adjustments in terminology.
