= Section 90 of the Constitution Act, 1867 =

Provision of the Constitution of Canada

British North America Act, 1867

Section 90 of the Constitution Act, 1867 (French: article 90 de la Loi constitutionnelle de 1867) is a provision of the Constitution of Canada relating to provincial appropriation and taxation bills, the recommendation for money votes in provincial legislative assemblies, and the federal government's power of disallowance and reservation with respect to provincial laws.

The Constitution Act, 1867 is the constitutional statute which established Canada. Originally named the British North America Act, 1867, the Act continues to be the foundational statute for the Constitution of Canada, although it has been amended many times since 1867. It is now recognised as part of the supreme law of Canada.

== Constitution Act, 1867 ==
The Constitution Act, 1867 is part of the Constitution of Canada and thus part of the supreme law of Canada. The Act sets out the constitutional framework of Canada, including the structure of the federal government and the powers of the federal government and the provinces. It was the product of extensive negotiations between the provinces of British North America at the Charlottetown Conference in 1864, the Quebec Conference in 1864, and the London Conference in 1866. Those conferences were followed by consultations with the British government in 1867. The Act was then enacted by the British Parliament under the name the British North America Act, 1867. In 1982 the Act was brought under full Canadian control through the Patriation of the Constitution, and was renamed the Constitution Act, 1867. Since Patriation, the Act can only be amended in Canada, under the amending formula set out in the Constitution Act, 1982.

== Text of section 90 ==
Section 90 reads:

Application to Legislatures of Provisions relating to Money Votes, &c.
90 The following Provisions of this Act respecting the Parliament of Canada, namely,—the Provisions relating to Appropriation and Tax Bills, the Recommendation of Money Votes, the Assent to Bills, the Disallowance of Acts, and the Signification of Pleasure on Bills reserved,—shall extend and apply to the Legislatures of the several Provinces as if those Provisions were here re-enacted and made applicable in Terms to the respective Provinces and the Legislatures thereof, with the Substitution of the Lieutenant Governor of the Province for the Governor General, of the Governor General for the Queen and for a Secretary of State, of One Year for Two Years, and of the Province for Canada.

Section 90 is found in Part V of the Constitution Act, 1867, dealing with provincial constitutions. It has not been amended since the Act was enacted in 1867.

== Legislative history ==
The Quebec Resolutions dealt with the issues of appropriation and taxation bills, royal assent, reservation and disallowance in a series of separate provisions, applicable to both the federal and provincial governments:

- resolution 48 provided that taxation bills had to originate in either the House of Commons or the House of Assembly;

- resolution 49 provided that the House of Commons and the House of Assembly could not pass an appropriation or tax bill unless it had been recommended by the governor general or the lieutenant governor;

- resolution 50 provided that federal bills could be reserved by the governor general for the monarch's consideration, and provincial bills could be reserved by the lieutenant governor for the governor general's consideration;

- resolution 51 provided that federal bills could be disallowed by the monarch within two years of passage, and provincial bills could be disallowed by the governor general within one year of passage.

The London resolutions took the same approach.

However, the rough draft of the bill prepared by the four provincial attorneys general after the main session of the London Conference took a somewhat different approach. (Note: The four attorneys general were John A. Macdonald, Canada West; George-Étienne Cartier, Canada East; William Alexander Henry, Nova Scotia; and Charles Fisher, New Brunswick.) The provisions respecting taxation and appropriation bills continued to apply equally to the federal government and to the provincial governments, but there were separate provisions respecting royal assent, reservation, and disallowance. The procedures for royal assent, reservation, and disallowance for federal bills were set out in considerable detail in three separate clauses, while the equivalent provincial provisions were set out in one clause.

The approach to the issue changed again in the next draft. All of the provisions were changed to relate only to the federal Parliament, with a note indicating that the delegates were to provide a draft relating to the provinces. That came in the fourth draft, where there were entirely separate provisions governing taxation and appropriation bills, royal assent, reservation and disallowance for the provinces. The approach changed yet again in the final draft bill, where there was a single short clause which instead applied all of the federal provisions to the provinces. At some point between that draft and the introduction of the bill in Parliament, section 90 received its current wording.

== Purpose and interpretation ==
Prior to Confederation, there were well-established parliamentary restrictions on appropriation and taxation bills. In addition, the British government had powers to regulate colonial legislation, such as royal assent, disallowance and reservation. The delegates to the Quebec Conference and the London Conference were in general agreement that those statutory provisions and prerogative powers should continue to exist, applicable to both the federal and the provincial governments.

=== Application of sections relating to federal Parliament ===
Section 90 is in Part V of the Act, which deals with the powers of the provincial legislatures. Section 90 picks up several provisions from Part IV of the Act, dealing with the federal Parliament, and applies them to the provincial legislatures, rather than reproducing them in detail. As a result, the provisions relating to federal taxation and appropriation bills (section 53 of the Act), the recommendation for money votes (section 54), royal assent and reservation of bills (section 55 and section 57), and the disallowance of acts (section 56), all apply to provincial legislatures, with appropriate changes to terminology.

=== Appropriation and tax bills ===
Section 53 of the Act provides that all federal bills to appropriate public money, or to impose taxes, shall originate in the federal House of Commons. This requirement has its origins in English constitutional history, when one of the major issues of the 17th century was control over public finances. The result in England, carried forward into the United Kingdom, was that all revenue bills relating to taxation and appropriation were required to originate in the elected House of Commons, not in the hereditary House of Lords. Section 53 of the Act applied that requirement to the Parliament of Canada, requiring all revenue bills to originate in the Canadian House of Commons.

Section 90 applied the requirement of financial control by the elected chamber to the provinces. At Confederation, the provinces of New Brunswick, Nova Scotia, and Quebec all had bicameral legislatures, with appointed upper houses, called legislative councils, and elected lower houses, called legislative assemblies. Only Ontario had a unicameral legislature, consisting of the elected legislative assembly. The effect of section 90 was that appropriation and taxation bills had to be introduced in the elected legislative assemblies of the provinces, by analogy to section 53's requirement that such bills be introduced in the federal House of Commons.

Over time, the provinces with legislative councils abolished them. Quebec was the last province to abolish its legislative council, in 1968. With the abolition of the provincial legislative councils, the question was whether this part of section 90 had any further effect, since all the legislative assemblies were now unicameral. At least one constitutional scholar, W.H. McConnell, argued that this part of section 90 was spent.

This issue was raised in a case in the Supreme Court of Canada, Re Eurig Estate. The majority of the Court rejected the argument that section 53 no longer had any application to the provinces. They held that section 53 set out the principle of "no taxation without representation", and meant that all provincial taxes had to be clearly authorised by the legislative assembly of the province. The tax in question, a probate fee, had not been properly authorised by the legislative assembly, and therefore was unconstitutional. The Supreme Court gave further guidance on the interpretation of section 53, and its application to the provinces via section 90, in a later case, Ontario English Catholic Teachers’ Association v. Ontario (Attorney General).

=== Recommendation of money votes ===
Section 54 of the Act sets out a procedural requirement for the consideration of bills concerning taxes or appropriation of public funds, commonly called "money bills". Section 54 provides that any bills concerning taxes or appropriations must be accompanied by a recommendation from the Governor General. Under the principles of responsible government, that means that the Governor General makes the recommendation on the advice of the federal Cabinet.

Section 90 applies section 54 to the provincial legislative assemblies, with the change that the recommendation is made by the lieutenant governor, on the advice of the provincial Cabinet.

The purpose of this provision is to impose controls over public finances. Both the legislative assemblies and the provincial cabinets must agree to new taxes and spending of public funding. The provision dates back to a procedural rule of the British House of Commons, first enacted in 1713. By ensuring that the executive had control over money bills, section 54 contributed to the development of responsible government.

=== Royal assent and reservation of bills ===
Section 55 of the Act sets out the powers of the Governor General with respect to bills passed by the two houses of the federal Parliament. It gives the Governor General three options: to grant royal assent in the name of the monarch; to withhold royal assent; or to reserve the bill for consideration by the monarch.

By the operation of section 90, this provision also applies to bills passed by the provincial legislative assemblies, with the difference that it gives the powers of assent or reservation to the provincial lieutenant governor. If a lieutenant governor reserved a bill, it would be considered by the Governor General, not the monarch.

==== Royal assent ====
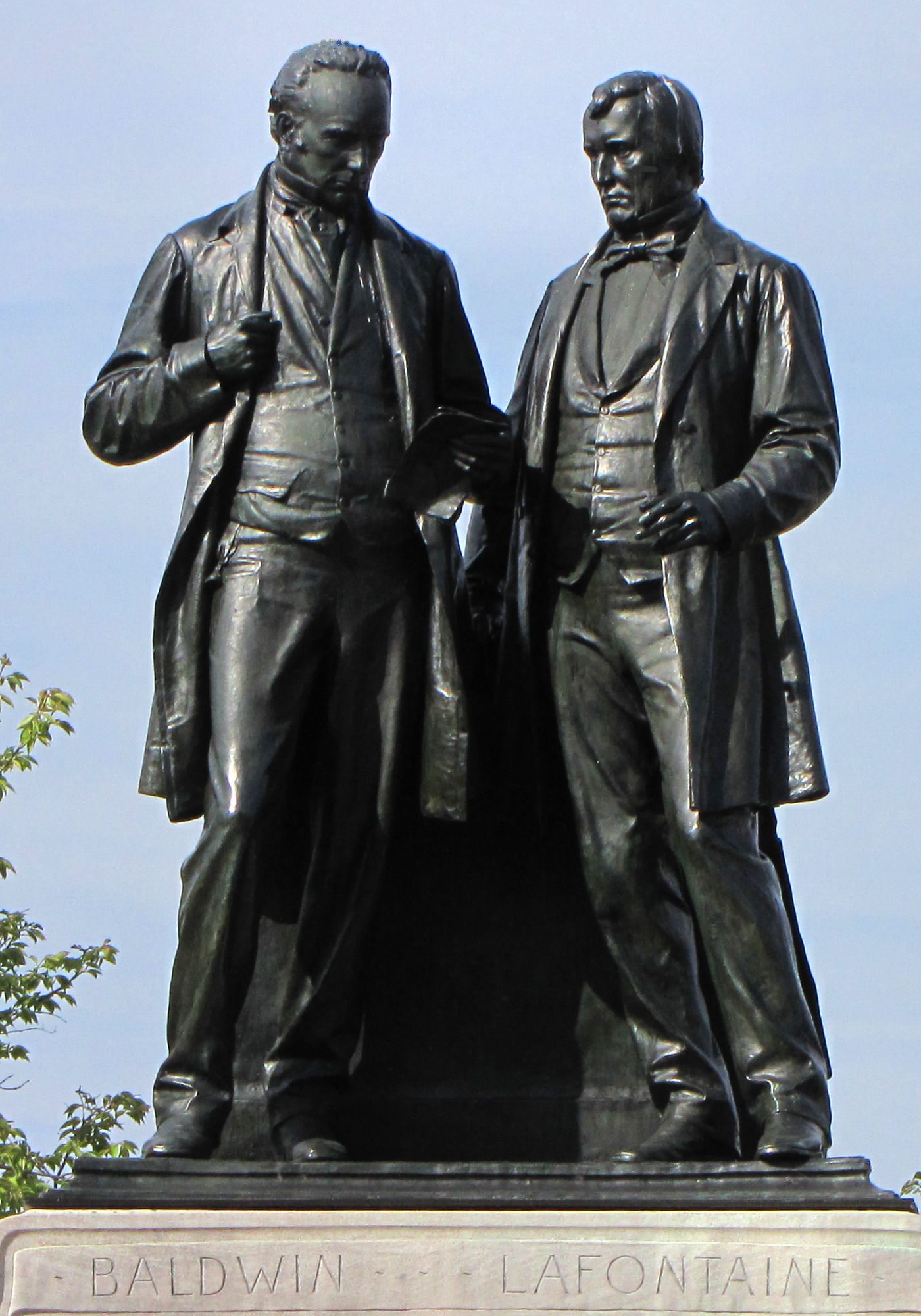
Parliament Hill monument to Baldwin and Lafontaine, who established responsible government in the Province of Canada

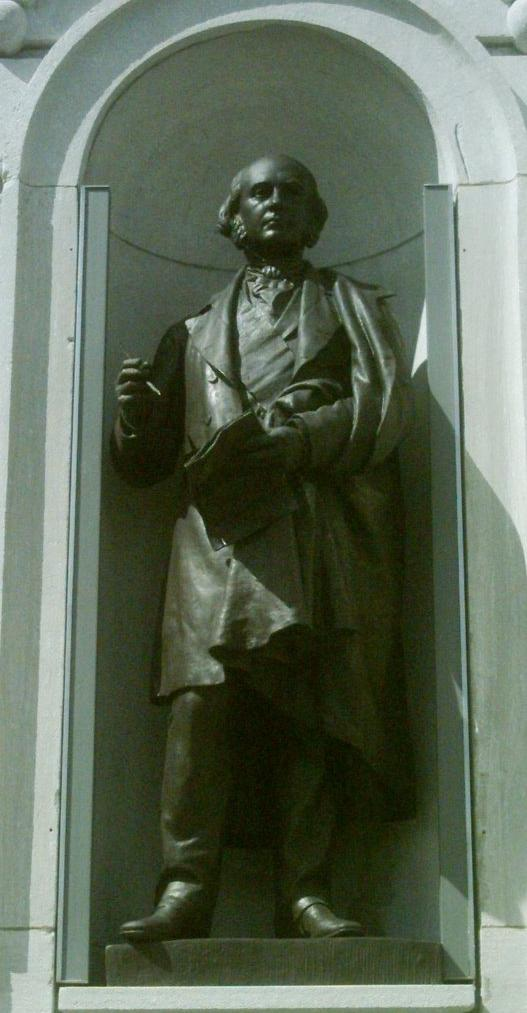
Statue of Governor General Lord Elgin, who gave royal assent to the Rebellion Losses Bill on the advice of Lafontaine and Baldwin, at the Quebec Parliament Building

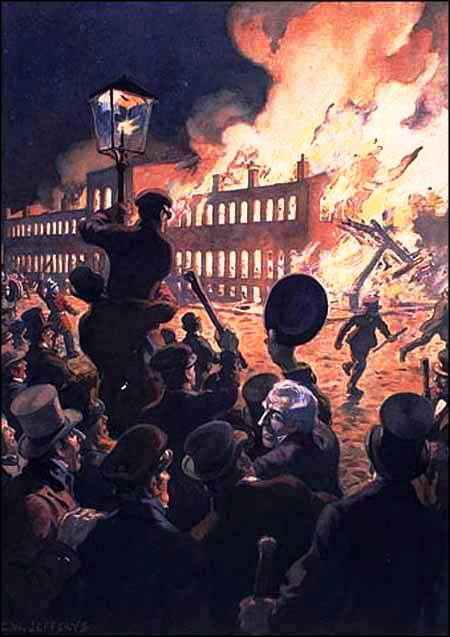
Burning of the Parliament building in Montreal, 1849

Canadian legislatures, both federally and provincially, are based on the model of the British Parliament. The monarch is a component of the legislatures, and royal assent is necessary for a bill to become law. In the colonial period, the governors could grant or withhold assent to a bill passed by a colonial legislature, depending on their view of the policy of the bill and whether it was consistent with the imperial policies of the British government. If the governor granted royal assent, the bill became law. If the governor withheld royal assent, the bill died and never became law.

In the 1830s and 1840s, reformers in the British North American colonies pressed for responsible government, which meant that the governor would choose the government from the groups which had a majority in the elected legislative assemblies, and would not deny royal assent to bills passed by the elected legislative assemblies. In 1848, starting with Nova Scotia, the British governors began to implement responsible government, shifting to a more ceremonial role.

The principle that the governor would not deny royal assent to a bill passed by the elected assembly was established in the Province of Canada in 1849, with the passage of the Rebellion Losses Bill, a measure proposed by the government of Louis-Hippolyte Lafontaine and Robert Baldwin. The bill would compensate residents of Lower Canada (now Quebec) who had suffered property losses during the Lower Canada Rebellions of 1837 and 1838. The bill was unpopular with the English-speaking Tories, who viewed it as rewarding French-Canadians for disloyalty to the British Crown. When the bill passed the two houses of the Parliament, the Tories agitated for the Governor General, Lord Elgin, to deny royal assent. Instead, Elgin granted royal assent, along with other bills passed by the LaFontaine-Baldwin government. Rioting broke out in Montreal, where the Parliament was sitting, and the parliament building was burnt to the ground by the rioters, but the constitutional convention was established that the governors always granted royal assent to bills passed by the elected assembly.

That constitutional convention was carried forward under Confederation, and applies to the provincial lieutenant governors. They are required to grant royal assent to bills passed by the elected legislative assemblies. Although sections 90 and 54 in theory give the lieutenant governor the power to withhold royal assent, as a matter of constitutional practice they always grant royal assent.

==== Reservation of provincial bills ====
During the colonial period, there was a third option for colonial governors: they could reserve consideration of a bill for the monarch, who could grant or refuse royal assent, acting on the advice of the British government. This mechanism was used to maintain British control, by ensuring that colonial legislation remained within the constitutional authority granted to the colony, and that the colonial legislation did not breach British imperial policies. The British government would give instructions to each governor on the types of bills that should be reserved.

Upon Confederation, this power of reserving a bill was continued. Sections 55 and 57 of the Act gave the Governor General the power to reserve a federal bill for consideration by the British government, and gave the British government the power to grant or deny royal assent. Section 90 extended the same power of reservation to bills passed by the provincial legislatures, but with the federal government substituted for the British government. On this point, the Fathers of Confederation favoured a strong federal government, avoiding what they saw as a flaw in the Constitution of the United States, as evidenced by the American Civil War. The reservation power meant that the federal government could review provincial bills that appeared to exceed provincial authority, or which intruded on federal policy. By the combined effect of section 90 and section 55, the lieutenant governors of the provinces could reserve provincial bills for consideration by the federal government.

In the early years of Confederation, particularly under the Conservative government of Prime Minister John A. Macdonald, the lieutenant governors were given instructions on the types of bills to reserve for consideration by the federal government. The federal government then used the power of reservation, and the related power of disallowance, to prevent the provinces from exceeding what the federal government considered to be constitutional limits on provincial powers, or passing laws that conflicted with federal policies.

As time passed, the use of reservation dwindled. The courts took on the role of determining the constitutional limits of both the federal and the provincial governments, through judicial review on constitutional questions. The development of responsible government and provincial autonomy also made it more politically difficult for the federal government to intervene with regard to provincial laws.

Writing in 1955, Gérard La Forest (later a justice of the Supreme Court of Canada) concluded that since Confederation in 1867, at least sixty-nine provincial bills had been reserved by lieutenant governors for consideration by the federal government. The federal government had granted royal assent to thirteen of the bills. La Forest commented that the "vast majority" of the reservations had occurred before 1900.

There has been one use of the reservation power since La Forest's 1955 study. In 1961, Lieutenant Governor Bastedo of Saskatchewan reserved a bill passed by the Legislative Assembly of Saskatchewan. The bill would have altered terms of certain mineral contracts in the province. He apparently did so on his own initiative, not based on instructions from the federal government. He said that there were grave doubts whether the bill was in the public interest, and whether it was constitutionally valid. When the bill was considered by the federal government of Prime Minister John Diefenbaker, it was quickly given royal assent.

=== Signification of pleasure on bills reserved ===
Section 57 of the Act provided the procedure for consideration of reserved federal bills. If the Governor General reserved a federal bill, the Governor General would send it to one of the British cabinet ministers. The bill would then be considered by the monarch-in-council, the formal term for the British Cabinet, and the monarch would either grant or withhold royal assent on the advice of the British government. The decision had to be made within two years of the passage of the reserved bill.

Section 90 applied the same process for provincial bills reserved by a lieutenant governor, with the differences outlined in section 90: the lieutenant governor would forward the reserved bill to the Governor General, and the Governor General in council, namely the federal Cabinet, then would have one year to decide whether to grant or withhold royal assent.

=== Disallowance of acts ===
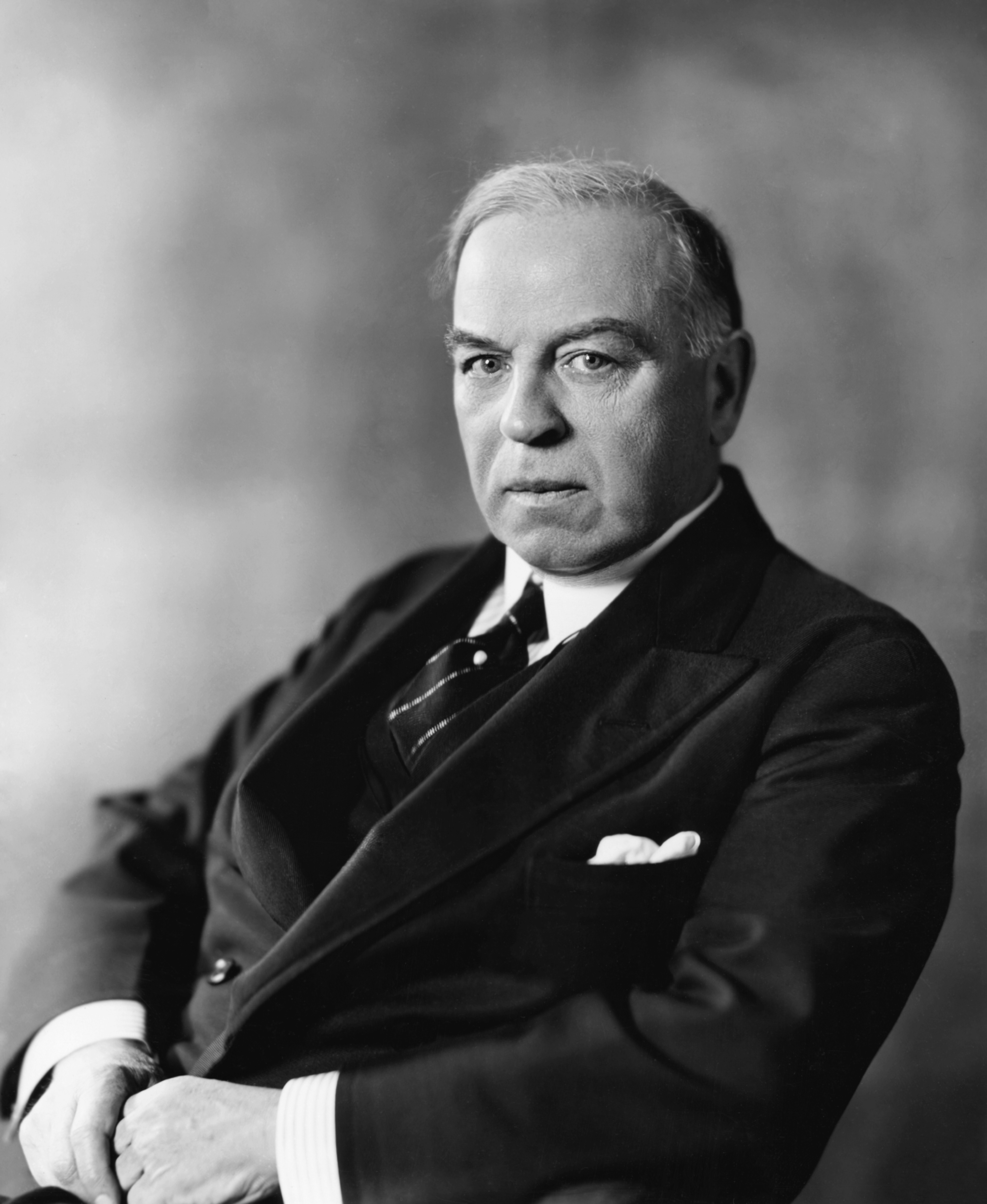
Prime Minister King, whose government disallowed three Alberta statutes in 1937

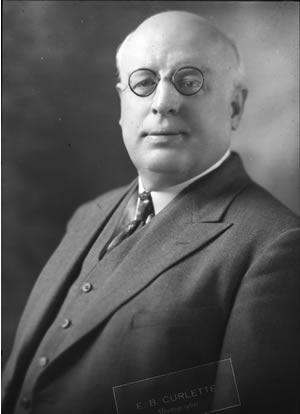
Premier Aberhart of Alberta, who contested the federal disallowance power

In addition to the reservation power, the British government had another mechanism to control statutes passed by a colonial legislature, namely the monarch's power to annul acts passed by a colonial legislature. The monarch would use this power, referred to as "disallowance", on the advice of the British cabinet. Like the reservation power, the disallowance power could be used by the British government to ensure colonial legislatures stayed within their constitutional authority, and did not pass legislation that affected British imperial policies.

As with the reservation power, the disallowance power was continued at Confederation. Section 56 of the Act gave the British Cabinet the power to disallow a statute passed by the federal government, up to two years from the date of passage by the federal Parliament. Section 90 applied the disallowance power to the provinces, giving the Governor General in Council the power to disallow a statute passed by a provincial legislature, with a deadline of one year.

Like the reservation power, the federal power to disallow provincial statutes was mainly used in the early years of Confederation, especially by the Conservative government of Prime Minister Macdonald. Four grounds were generally cited by the federal government as potentially warranting disallowance:

1. the provincial bill exceeded provincial jurisdiction, or conflicted with federal or imperial legislation;
2. the bill conflicted with federal policies or interests;
3. the bill conflicted with imperial policies or interests;
4. the bill was an abuse of power, unjust, unwise, or inexpedient.

The use of the federal disallowance power has dwindled since 1867:

- 1867 to 1881: 27 provincial acts were disallowed;
- 1881 to 1896: 38 disallowances;
- 1896 to 1911: 30 disallowances;
- 1911 to 1924: 6 disallowances;
- 1924 to 1943: 11 disallowances;
- 1944 to 2026: 0 disallowances.

The last major use of the disallowance power was with regard to a series of acts passed in 1937 by the Alberta Legislature, during the Social Credit government of Premier William Aberhart. The statutes attempted to regulate the banks in Alberta, but banking is an area of exclusive federal jurisdiction. The federal Liberal government of Prime Minister Mackenzie King disallowed three statutes passed by the Alberta in 1937, and then disallowed an additional eight statutes passed by the Alberta government designed to implement Social Credit policies. The final disallowance, in 1943, was an Alberta statute that attempted to regulate enemy aliens in Alberta.

The federal government asserted that all of the Alberta statutes intruded on matters of exclusive federal jurisdiction and therefore were properly within the use of the disallowance power. However, the use of disallowance raised political concerns about the federal government's decision to overrule the statutory policy of the democratically elected Alberta legislature. The Alberta government raised issues about the validity of the reservation and disallowance powers, since they had not been used for a considerable time.

In response, the federal government posed a reference case to the Supreme Court, asking if the constitutional powers of reservation and disallowance continued to exist. The Supreme Court unanimously concluded that the powers of reservation still existed and could be used by the federal government. The Court held that constitutional powers could not cease to exist simply because they were not exercised for a considerable period of time.

=== Current status of reservation and disallowance ===
More recently, in the Patriation Reference in 1981, a majority of the Supreme Court held that as a matter of law, reservation and disallowance continued to exist, while perhaps having "fallen into disuse". However, a differently constituted majority in the same case left open the possibility that a constitutional convention may have evolved limiting the use of those powers with respect to the provinces.

There has also been considerable academic discussion about the status of reservation and disallowance, and whether a constitutional convention exists which prevents the federal government from using the powers of reservation or disallowance. Canadian constitutional law scholar Professor Peter Hogg speculated that there is now a constitutional convention against the use of the disallowance power by the federal government, and provides a detailed summary of the academic literature on this point. Hogg also commented on the political difficulties for the federal government to overrule the decisions of a democratically elected provincial government, as did McConnell.

One academic, Richard Albert, a professor of comparative constitutional law, has argued that both powers have fallen into "constitutional desuetude," and can no longer be used. On the other hand, some commentators have suggested that the disallowance power still retains value as a means to protect minority rights, when a province has used the notwithstanding clause of the Canadian Charter of Rights and Freedoms.

== Proposals for repeal ==
With the movement toward Patriation in the 1970s onwards, there were proposals to abolish the reservation and disallowance powers, at both the federal and provincial levels. The Victoria Charter, 1971, was a proposal for patriation which included the abolition of reservation and disallowance, by repealing part of section 55, all of sections 56 and 57, and amending section 90 accordingly. However, the Victoria Charter was not enacted. The final Patriation package, set out in the Constitution Act, 1982, did not include the abolition of the powers of disallowance or reservation and did not amend section 90. Abolition of federal disallowance and reservation of provincial laws was also proposed in the Charlottetown Accord, but the Accord was defeated in a national referendum.

== Related provisions of the Constitution Act, 1867 ==
Section 53 of the Act deals with appropriation and tax bills. It states that these types of bills must originate in the House of Commons.

Section 54 of the Act deals with the recommendation for money votes.

Section 55 of the Act deals with royal assent and reservation of bills.

Section 56 of the Act deals with disallowance of federal bills.

Section 57 of the Act sets out the process for consideration of reserved bills.
