= Section 37 of the Constitution Act, 1867 =

Provision of the Constitution of Canada

British North America Act, 1867

Section 37 of the Constitution Act, 1867 (French: article 37 de la Loi constitutionnelle de 1867) is a provision of the Constitution of Canada relating to the number and allocation of seats of the House of Commons, the lower house of the federal Parliament of Canada. The section sets out the total number of members of the House of Commons, which is 343 as of the 2025 general election. Section 37 originally provided that the Commons would be composed of 181 members, but that number has gradually increased as new provinces and territories joined Confederation.

The Constitution Act, 1867 is the constitutional statute which established Canada. Originally named the British North America Act, 1867, the Act continues to be the foundational statute for the Constitution of Canada, although it has been amended many times since 1867. It is now recognised as part of the supreme law of Canada.

== Constitution Act, 1867 ==
The Constitution Act, 1867 is part of the Constitution of Canada and thus part of the supreme law of Canada. The Act sets out the constitutional framework of Canada, including the structure of the federal government and the powers of the federal government and the provinces. It was the product of extensive negotiations between the provinces of British North America at the Charlottetown Conference in 1864, the Quebec Conference in 1864, and the London Conference in 1866. Those conferences were followed by consultations with the British government in 1867. The Act was then enacted in 1867 by the British Parliament under the name the British North America Act, 1867. In 1982 the Act was brought under full Canadian control through the Patriation of the Constitution, and was renamed the Constitution Act, 1867. Since Patriation the Act can only be amended in Canada, under the amending formula set out in the Constitution Act, 1982.

== Text of section 37 ==
As currently modified by the most recent redistribution of seats, section 37 reads:

Constitution of House of Commons in Canada
37 The House of Commons shall, subject to the Provisions of this Act, consist of three hundred and forty-three members of whom one hundred and twenty-two shall be elected for Ontario, seventy-eight for Quebec, eleven for Nova Scotia, ten for New Brunswick, fourteen for Manitoba, forty-three for British Columbia, four for Prince Edward Island, fourteen for Saskatchewan, thirty-seven for Alberta, seven for Newfoundland, one for the Yukon Territory, one for the Northwest Territories and one for Nunavut.

Section 37 is found in Part IV of the Constitution Act, 1867, dealing with the legislative power of the federal Parliament. It has been amended by implication many times since 1867. The wording of section 37 was not formally amended by those additions, but the amendments have been consolidated to the present wording by the federal Department of Justice in the online version of the Constitution Act, 1867.

== Legislative history ==
=== Original version ===
As originally enacted in 1867, section 37 read as follows:

Constitution of House of Commons in Canada
37 The House of Commons shall, subject to the Provisions of this Act, consist of One hundred and eighty-one Members, of whom Eighty-two shall be elected for Ontario, Sixty-five for Quebec, Nineteen for Nova Scotia, and Fifteen for New Brunswick.

Section 37 was based on resolution 17 of the Quebec Resolutions of 1864, but with a projected total number of 194 seats: eighty-two for Ontario, sixty-five for Quebec, nineteen for Nova Scotia, and fifteen for New Brunswick, and including eight for Newfoundland and five for Prince Edward Island. Resolution 18 of the London Resolutions of 1866 instead had a total of only 181 seats, as neither Newfoundland nor Prince Edward Island were participating. The proposed number of seats for Ontario, Quebec, Nova Scotia and New Brunswick was unchanged.

With slight textual variations, the wording of resolution 18 of the London Resolutions was carried forward in the various drafts of the bill, and was set out in the final draft of the bill prior to introduction in the British Parliament on February 12, 1867.

=== Subsequent amendments ===
Section 37 has been amended by implication many times since 1867. Each time a new province was added, the House of Commons was expanded, and eventually the federal territories also acquired representation in the House of Commons. As the population of Canada has grown, there have also been increases in the number of seats, according to the formula set out in section 51 of the Act. The wording of section 37 was not formally amended by those additions, but has been consolidated to the present wording by the federal Department of Justice in the online version of the Constitution Act, 1867. (Note: This practice of consolidating implied amendments was implemented in 1956 by Elmer Driedger, QC, Assistant Deputy Minister of Justice and Parliamentary Counsel, in A Consolidation of The British North America Acts, 1867 to 1952 (Ottawa: Queen's Printer, 1956), p. iii.) As of 2025, the total number of members of the House of Commons is 343.

== Purpose and interpretation ==
=== "Rep. by Pop." ===
Prior to Confederation, what are now Ontario and Quebec were joined in the single Province of Canada, as Canada West and Canada East. Each region had equal representation in the provincial Parliament. The population of Canada West gradually surpassed the population of Canada East, leading to political discontent in Canada West, and instability in the government. Agitation grew for "representation by population" (also called "rep by pop").

That became one of the driving forces for the Confederation movement, as politicians from Canada East and Canada West both saw federation as a solution to the political instability, with each province to be represented by population in the lower house of the new federation, combined with the establishment of two new provinces to deal with local matters.

=== Allocation of seats ===
Section 51 of the Act sets out the formula for reallocating seats in the House of Commons after every decennial census. Section 52 provides that the number of seats can be increased, provided it is done consistently with the formula for reallocation.

The federal Parliament has enacted the Electoral Boundaries Readjustment Act to carry out the regular redistribution of seats in the House of Commons. Under that act, the non-partisan Chief Electoral Officer for Canada applies the formula for the allocation of seats to determine how many seats each province will receive. In doing so, the Chief Electoral Officer relies on data furnished by the Chief Statistician of Canada.

The current seat allocation was determined by this process after the 2021 census. It was set out by the Chief Electoral Officer in a Representation Order under the Electoral Boundaries Readjustment Act. That order came into force for the 2025 federal election.

== Related provisions ==
Section 8 of the Act requires that a census be held every ten years, with the population broken down by province.

Section 51(1) provides the method of allocation of seats for each province in the House of Commons.

Section 51(2) provides that each territory will have one seat in the House of Commons.

Section 51A of the Act provides for a minimum number of seats for each province. It sets out the "Senate floor" rule: each province is entitled to the same number of seats in the Commons which it has in the Senate, regardless of population shifts.

Section 52 of the Act provides that Parliament can increase the number of seats in the House of Commons, provided it respects the principle of proportionate representation of the provinces.
