= Section 54 of the Constitution Act, 1867 =

Provision of the Constitution of Canada

British North America Act, 1867

Section 54 of the Constitution Act, 1867 (French: article 54 de la Loi constitutionnelle de 1867) is a provision of the Constitution of Canada relating to taxation and appropriation legislation in the Parliament of Canada. It provides that the House of Commons shall not consider a bill relating to taxes or appropriation unless it is accompanied by a recommendation from the governor general (in effect, the federal Cabinet) that the House of Commons consider the bill.

The recommendation for money bills is one of the ways in which responsible government is implemented, ensuring that the federal finances are controlled jointly by both the executive and legislative branches. Although the recommendation is made by the governor general, it is often referred to as the "royal recommendation". The requirement for the royal recommendation for money bills also applies to the provincial legislatures by means of section 90 of the act.

The Constitution Act, 1867 is the constitutional statute that established Canada. Originally named the British North America Act, 1867, the act continues to be the foundational statute for the Constitution of Canada, although it has been amended many times since 1867. It is now recognised as part of the supreme law of Canada.

== Constitution Act, 1867 ==
The Constitution Act, 1867 is part of the Constitution of Canada and thus part of the supreme law of Canada. It was the product of extensive negotiations by the governments of the British North American provinces at three separate conferences in the 1860s. Following those conferences, there were consultations with the British government in 1867. The act sets out the basic constitutional structure of Canada, creating the federal government and defining the powers of the federal government and the provinces. It was enacted in 1867 by the British Parliament under the name of the British North America Act, 1867.

The act did not include any power for it to be amended in Canada, so amendments had to be made by the British Parliament at the request of the Canadian Parliament. That remained the case until Patriation of the Constitution in 1982, when the act was brought under full Canadian control and was renamed the Constitution Act, 1867. Since 1982, the act can only be amended in Canada under the amending formula set out in the Constitution Act, 1982.

== Text of section 54 ==
Section 54 reads:

Recommendation of Money Votes
54 It shall not be lawful for the House of Commons to adopt or pass any Vote, Resolution, Address, or Bill, for the Appropriation of any Part of the Public Revenue, or of any Tax or Impost, to any Purpose that has not been first recommended to that House by Message of the Governor General in the Session in which such Vote, Resolution, Address, or Bill is proposed.

The provision is found in Part IV of the Constitution Act, 1867, dealing with the federal legislative power. It has not been amended since the act was enacted in 1867.

== Legislative history ==
Section 54 has its origins in a standing order of the British House of Commons, passed in 1713, which provided that the House of Commons would not consider tax bills or spending bills without a Crown recommendation that the bill be considered:

That this House will receive no petition for any sum of money relating to the public service but what is recommended by the Crown.

The requirement for the royal recommendation continues to be set out in the Standing Orders of the British House of Commons.

In 1840, the British Parliament passed the Union Act, 1840, which merged the provinces of Lower Canada and Upper Canada into the Province of Canada. The Union Act contained the following requirement:

Provided also, that it shall not be lawful for the said Legislative Assembly to originate or pass any Vote, Resolution, or Bill for the Appropriation of any Part of the Surplus of the said Consolidated Revenue Fund, or of any other Tax or Impost, to any Purpose which shall not have been first recommended by a Message of the Governor to the said Legislative Assembly during the Session in which such Vote, Resolution, or Bill shall be passed.

When Confederation was being debated, delegates included a requirement for tax and spending bills to have a recommendation from the governor general in both the Quebec Resolutions of 1864 and the London Resolutions of 1866. The provision was set out in the rough draft of the British North America bill prepared by a sub-committee of the London Conference, composed of the four provincial attorneys general. (Note: The four attorneys general were John A. Macdonald, Canada West; George-Étienne Cartier, Canada East; William Alexander Henry, Nova Scotia; and Charles Fisher, New Brunswick.) It was included in all of the drafts of the bill leading up to the passage of the Constitution Act, 1867.

The standing orders of the House of Commons and the Senate include provisions which recognise and implement the requirement set out in section 54. Standing order 79 of the House of Commons repeats the wording of section 54. Rule 10-7 of the Senate is more condensed: "The Senate shall not proceed with a bill appropriating public money unless the appropriation has been recommended by the Governor General."

== Purpose and interpretation ==
=== Historical British origins ===
This provision is based historically on British constitutional principles relating to public finances. After the English Civil War and the passage of the Bill of Rights, it was firmly established that legislation enacted by Parliament was needed for all taxes and all appropriations of public funds. The English House of Commons took the lead on this point, and gradually acquired primary control over public finances. Bills to impose taxes or appropriate public funds from the treasury, commonly called "money bills", had to originate in the House of Commons, and the monarch could not personally impose taxes or appropriate funds.

However, if every member of the House of Commons had an equal opportunity to introduce money bills, there would not be firm budgetary controls. In order to address this issue, the House of Commons passed a rule in 1713 stating that the House would not consider any money bill unless it came with a monarch's recommendation that the bill was essential for the public finances. The effect of the rule was to give joint control over money bills to the executive and legislative branches. This procedural rule is continued today as part of the Standing Orders of the British House of Commons. The leading authority on British parliamentary practice, Erskine May, describes the principle that public funds are not to be spent except on the initiative of the Crown as "a principle of the highest constitutional importance".

=== British North America ===
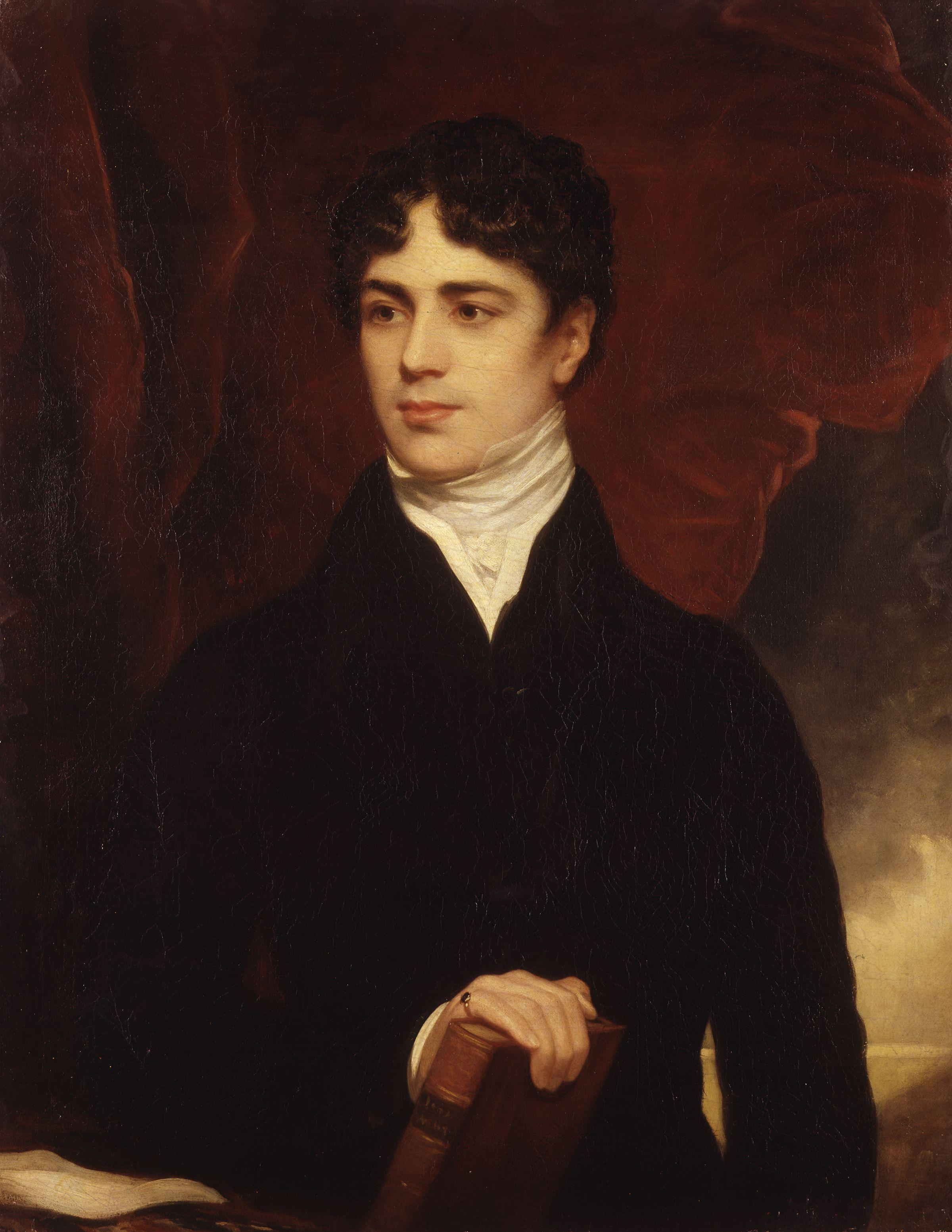
Lord Durham, who proposed that the royal recommendation for money bills be implemented in British North America

Control over the public finances became a major point of contention in the British North American colonies in the 19th century, particularly in Lower Canada and Upper Canada. Disputes between the elected legislative assemblies and the governors, appointed by the British government, became a routine aspect of public life.

Following the Rebellions of 1837–1838 in Lower Canada and Upper Canada, Lord Durham in his Report on British North America recommended that the principle of a Crown recommendation be adopted in the proposed union of Lower Canada and Upper Canada, the same as in the British Parliament: money bills were to be approved by the elected Assemblies, but only on recommendation from the governor. As a subsequent editor of the Report summarised, "no money votes were to be proposed except with the consent of the Crown, i.e., by the responsible ministers".

This policy was established in the Union Act, 1840, which merged the two Canadas into the single Province of Canada. The Union Act provided that money bills had to originate in the elected Legislative Assembly of the new province, but only on a recommendation from the governor. This combined control over finances by the elected legislative body and the executive contributed strongly to the development of responsible government.

=== Confederation ===
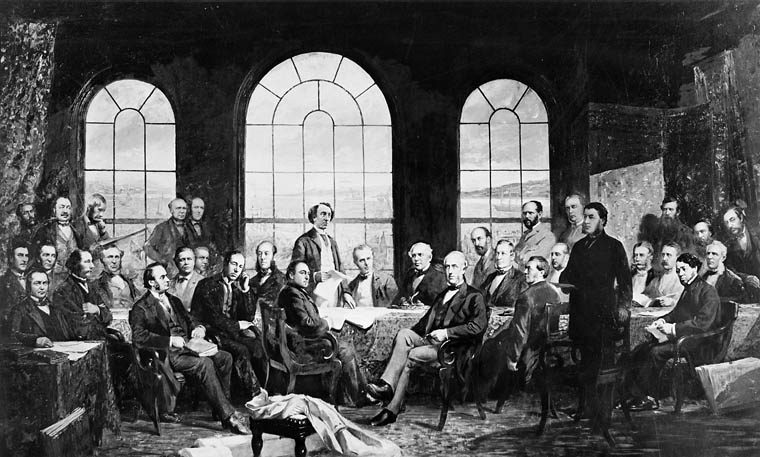
Fathers of Confederation at the Quebec Conference, 1864

At the time of Canadian Confederation in 1867, this principle of joint control over the public finances was well-established in both the United Kingdom and the British North American provinces. Following the example of the Union Act, section 54 creates a constitutional requirement for a recommendation for money bills, not simply as a parliamentary rule as in the United Kingdom. The recommendation to the House of Commons is made by the governor general, not the monarch. Although the recommendation is made by the governor general, it is often referred to as the "royal recommendation".

=== Current operation ===
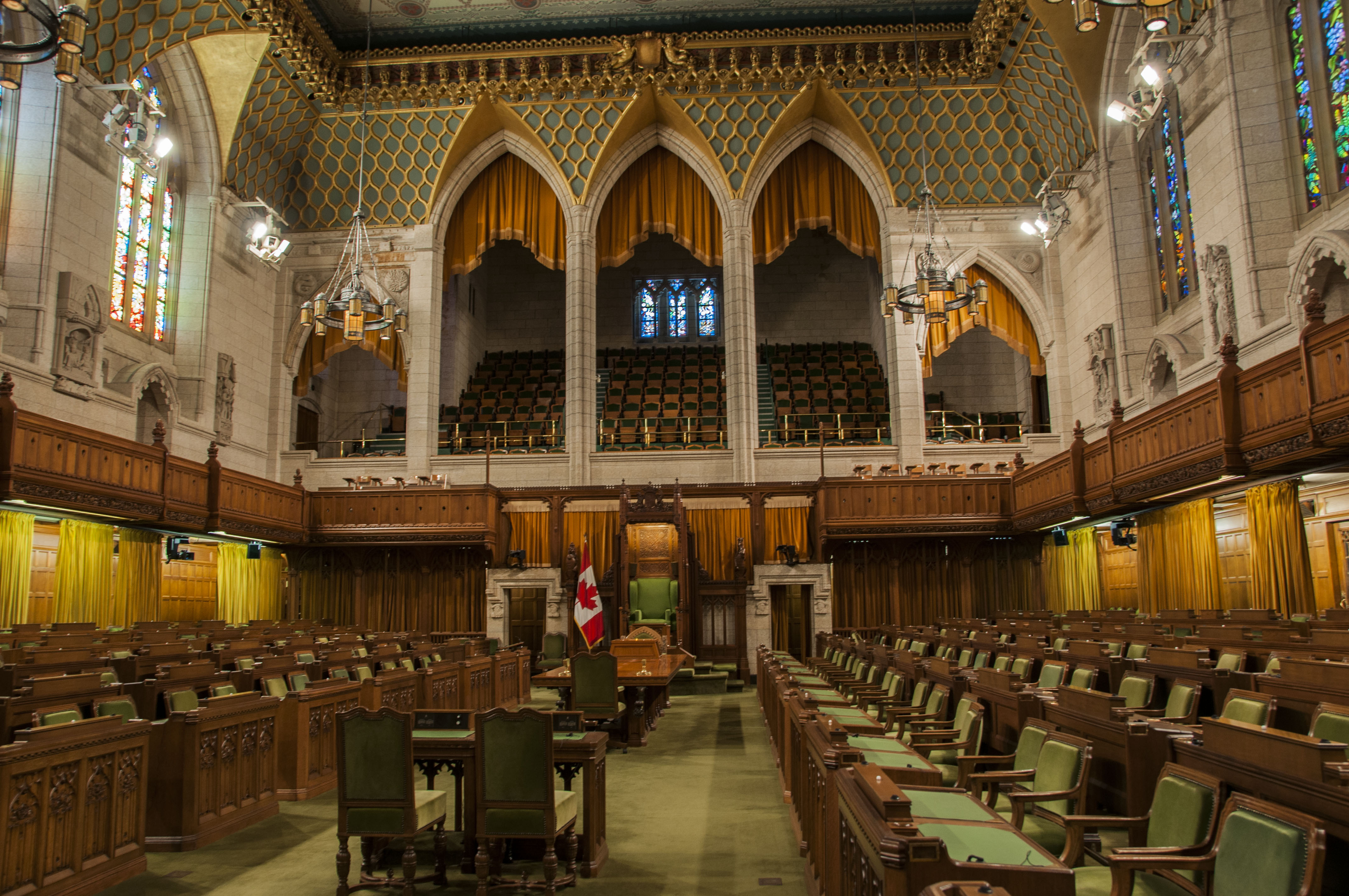
The House of Commons, where money bills must be introduced and passed

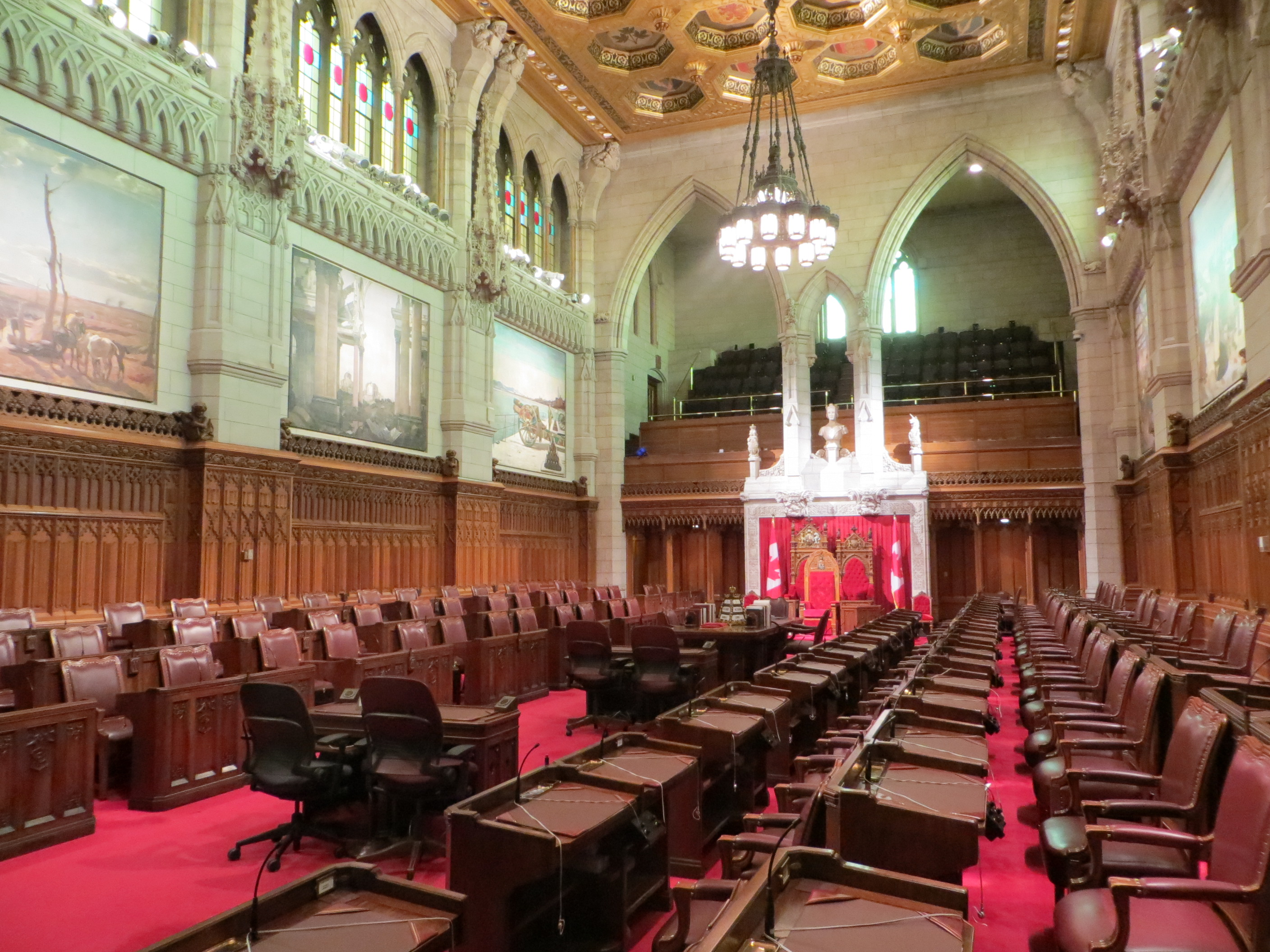
The Senate, where money bills must be passed

Under the principle of responsible government, the recommendation is authorised by the federal Cabinet. A Cabinet member gives the governor general's recommendation to the Commons at any stage before third reading, the final vote on a bill in the Commons. This is now usually done by means of a written notice accompanying a bill. The recommendation must be given for any new financial legislation, and again for any proposal to change an existing tax or appropriation bill in any significant fashion.

The effect of section 54 on private member's bills has changed over the years. Formerly, if it appeared to the Speaker of the Commons that a private member's bill would require the spending of public money or an increase in taxes, the Speaker would rule the bill out of order when it was first introduced. However, changes to the procedural rules regarding private member's bills in 2003 have increased the possibility that those bills will come to a vote. That change, in turn, has resulted in a change in approach to the royal recommendation. Now, the Speaker will recognise that the sponsor of the private member's bill has the right to have it debated, but will urge the sponsor to seek the royal recommendation. If the royal recommendation has not been given by the time the bill is ready for final debate on third reading, the Speaker will rule it out of order.

There is uncertainty regarding how far section 54 may limit the authority of the Senate and private members with regard to money bills. For one thing, there has not been any court decision clarifying the precise scope of the section. In addition, the precedents from the Commons are ambiguous, and it is unclear whether the Senate can change a money bill that the Commons has passed to increase spending or taxation. In some cases, if the Senate has amended a money bill passed by the Commons, the Speaker of the House of Commons has ruled the amended bill out of order and refused to allow it to be considered. On other occasions, the Speaker has simply pointed out the issue in debate to allow the members of the House of Commons to decide. In some cases, the Commons has rejected Senate amendments, as a breach of the powers of the House of Commons, but in other cases, the Commons has proceeded to consider the amendments.

It is clear that the Senate can amend a money bill to decrease spending or taxation.

== Relationship to Section 53 ==
Section 54 is related to section 53 of the Act, which requires that all tax or appropriation bills must be introduced in the House of Commons. The combined effect of these two sections is joint control over public finance, reconciling the principle of control by the elected Commons with the need for budgetary discipline by the executive. The combined control over the public finances contributed to the development of responsible government.

== Application to the provinces ==
The provision only refers to the requirement for a recommendation by the governor general with respect to federal bills. However, the requirement applies indirectly to the provinces, by means of section 90 of the act, which adapts the recommendation requirement to provincial bills. The provincial lieutenant governor is substituted for the governor general, acting on the advice of the provincial cabinet.
