= Section 53 of the Constitution Act, 1867 =

Provision of the Constitution of Canada

British North America Act, 1867

Section 53 of the Constitution Act, 1867 (French: article 53 de la Loi constitutionnelle de 1867) is a provision of the Constitution of Canada relating to taxation and appropriation statutes, which are under the control of the House of Commons, the lower house of the Parliament of Canada.

The requirement in section 53 also applies indirectly to the provinces. Section 90 of the act provides that the provision respecting taxation and appropriations also applies in the provincial legislatures.

The Constitution Act, 1867 is the constitutional statute which established Canada. Originally named the British North America Act, 1867, the Act continues to be the foundational statute for the Constitution of Canada, although it has been amended many times since 1867. It is now recognised as part of the supreme law of Canada.

== Constitution Act, 1867 ==
The Constitution Act, 1867 is part of the Constitution of Canada and thus part of the "supreme law of Canada". The Act sets out the constitutional framework of Canada, including the structure of the federal government and the powers of the federal government and the provinces. It was the product of extensive negotiations between the provinces of British North America at the Charlottetown Conference in 1864, the Quebec Conference in 1864, and the London Conference in 1866. Those conferences were followed by consultations with the British government in 1867. The Act was then enacted by the British Parliament under the name the British North America Act, 1867. In 1982 the Act was brought under full Canadian control through the Patriation of the Constitution, and was renamed the Constitution Act, 1867. Since Patriation, the Act can only be amended in Canada, under the amending formula set out in the Constitution Act, 1982.

== Text of section 53 ==
Section 53 reads:

Appropriation and Tax Bills
53 Bills for appropriating any Part of the Public Revenue, or for imposing any Tax or Impost, shall originate in the House of Commons.

Section 53 is found in Part IV of the Constitution Act, 1867, dealing with federal legislative power. It has not been amended since the Act was enacted in 1867.

== Legislative history ==
Section 53 traces its origins back to section 57 of the Union Act, 1840, the constituent statute of the Province of Canada, which dealt with this issue:

Provided always, that all Bills for appropriating any Part of the Surplus of the said Consolidated Revenue Fund, or for imposing any new Tax or Impost, shall originate in the Legislative Assembly of the said Province of Canada...

The Quebec Resolutions contained a similar provision, as did the London Resolutions.

Following the agreement on the London Resolutions, a sub-committee composed of the four provincial attorneys general prepared a rough draft of the British North America bill. It contained a similar provision, with the wording tracking section 57 from the Union Act, 1840. (Note: The four attorneys general were John A. Macdonald, Canada West; George-Étienne Cartier, Canada East; William Alexander Henry, Nova Scotia; and Charles Fisher, New Brunswick.) Subsequent drafts took the same approach, with minor stylistic changes. Section 53 took final form in the bill introduced in the British Parliament and enacted as the British North America Act, 1867.

== Purpose and interpretation ==
Section 53 adopts the principle from the British constitution that appropriation and taxation measures (called money bills) must be based on laws passed by Parliament, and must originate in the elected lower house. It gives the elected House of Commons control over matters of public finance, rather than the appointed Senate.

=== Historical British background ===
The control over appropriation and taxation was one of the major issues which led to the English Civil War. Following the Glorious Revolution, the Bill of Rights 1689 was passed, which declared: "That levying money for or to the use of the Crown by pretence of prerogative, without grant of Parliament, for longer time, or in other manner than the same is or shall be granted, is illegal."

Over the course of the next two centuries it became clearly established that the British House of Commons has full control over public finances, including taxation, appropriation, and review of expenditures, to ensure public money has been only been spent as authorized by appropriation acts.

=== Colonial period and the Province of Canada ===
Similar disputes over taxes and appropriations arose in the colonial period of British North America in the early 19th century. The elected legislative assemblies asserted control over the public finances, but the governors (appointed by the British government) and the legislative councils opposed control by the assemblies.

To resolve this dispute, when the Union Act was passed by the British Parliament in 1840, combining Lower Canada and Upper Canada into the Province of Canada, it included section 57. That section set out the principle that bills relating to taxes and appropriations had to originate in the elected Legislative Assembly. However, it was combined with a requirement that the Assembly could only consider financial measures which were recommended by the governor.

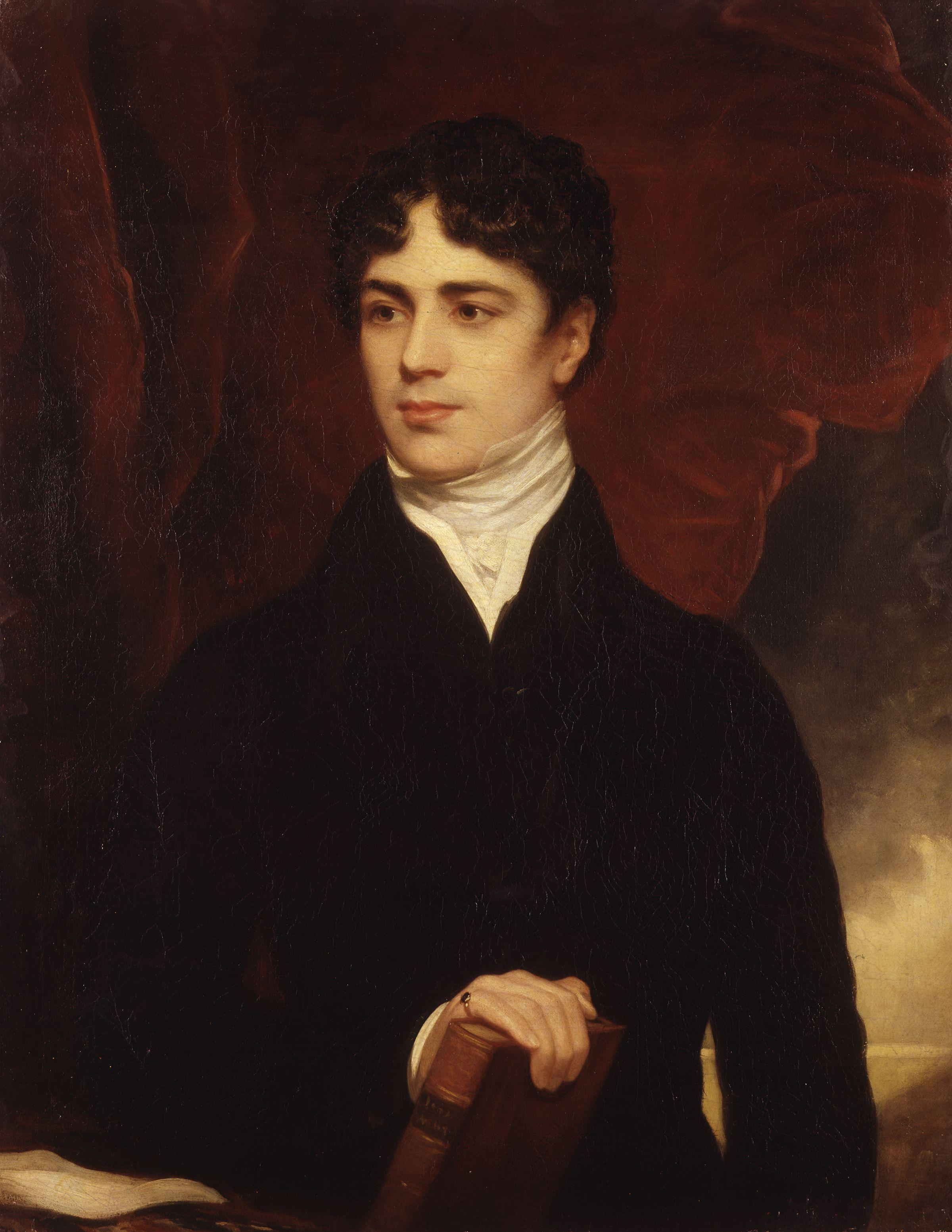
Lord Durham, whose report in 1838 was highly influential

This provision was proposed by Lord Durham in his Report on the Affairs of British North America in 1838. Durham considered that this approach, based on the financial practices of the British government, would reconcile the elected Assembly's control over public funds with the need for budgetary control by the executive.

This combined control over finances by the elected legislative body and the executive contributed strongly to the development of responsible government. As a subsequent editor of the Report summarised, "no money votes were to be proposed except with the consent of the Crown, i.e., by the responsible ministers".

=== House of Commons control over public finances ===
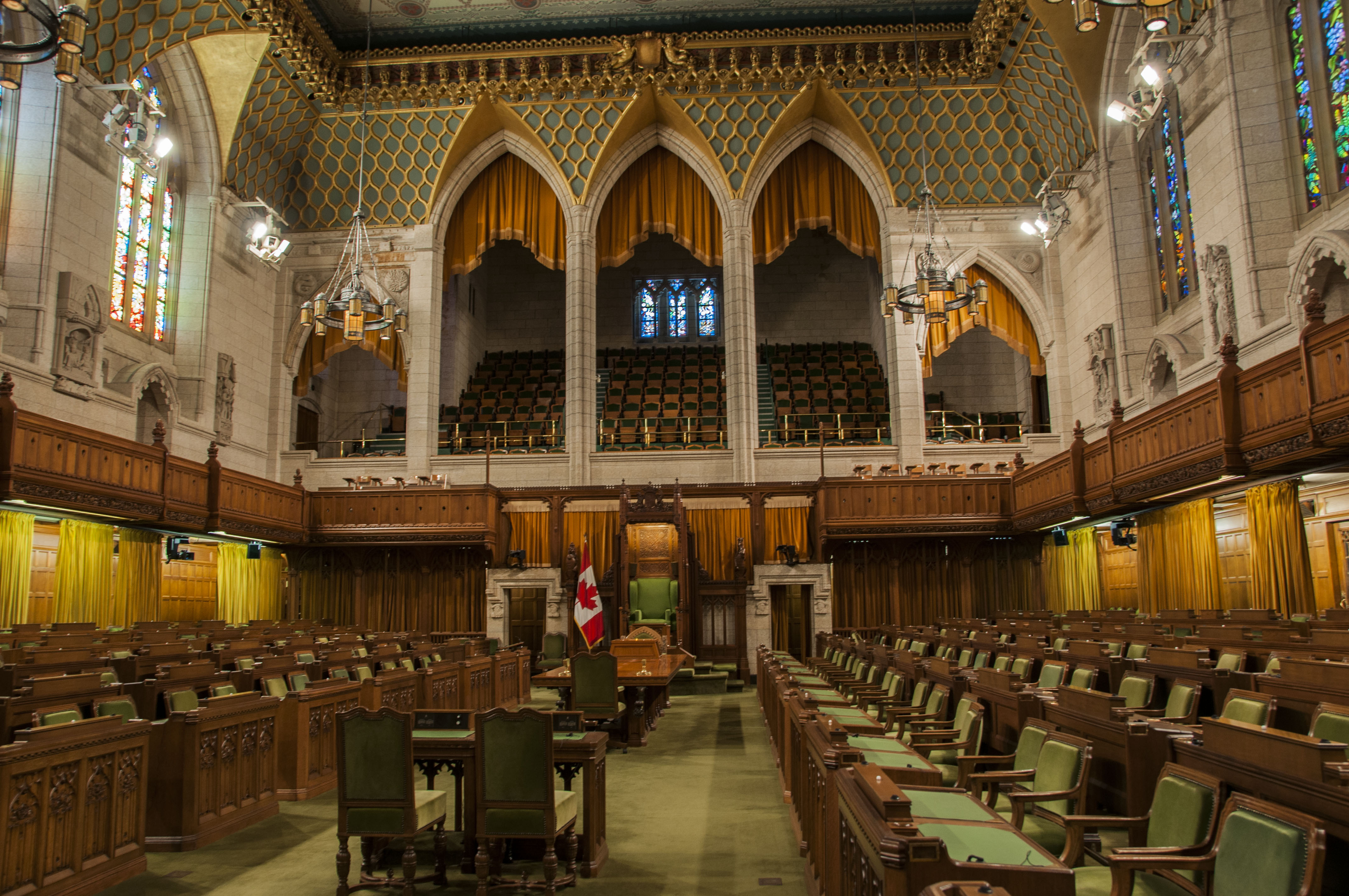
The House of Commons, where all money bills must be introduced

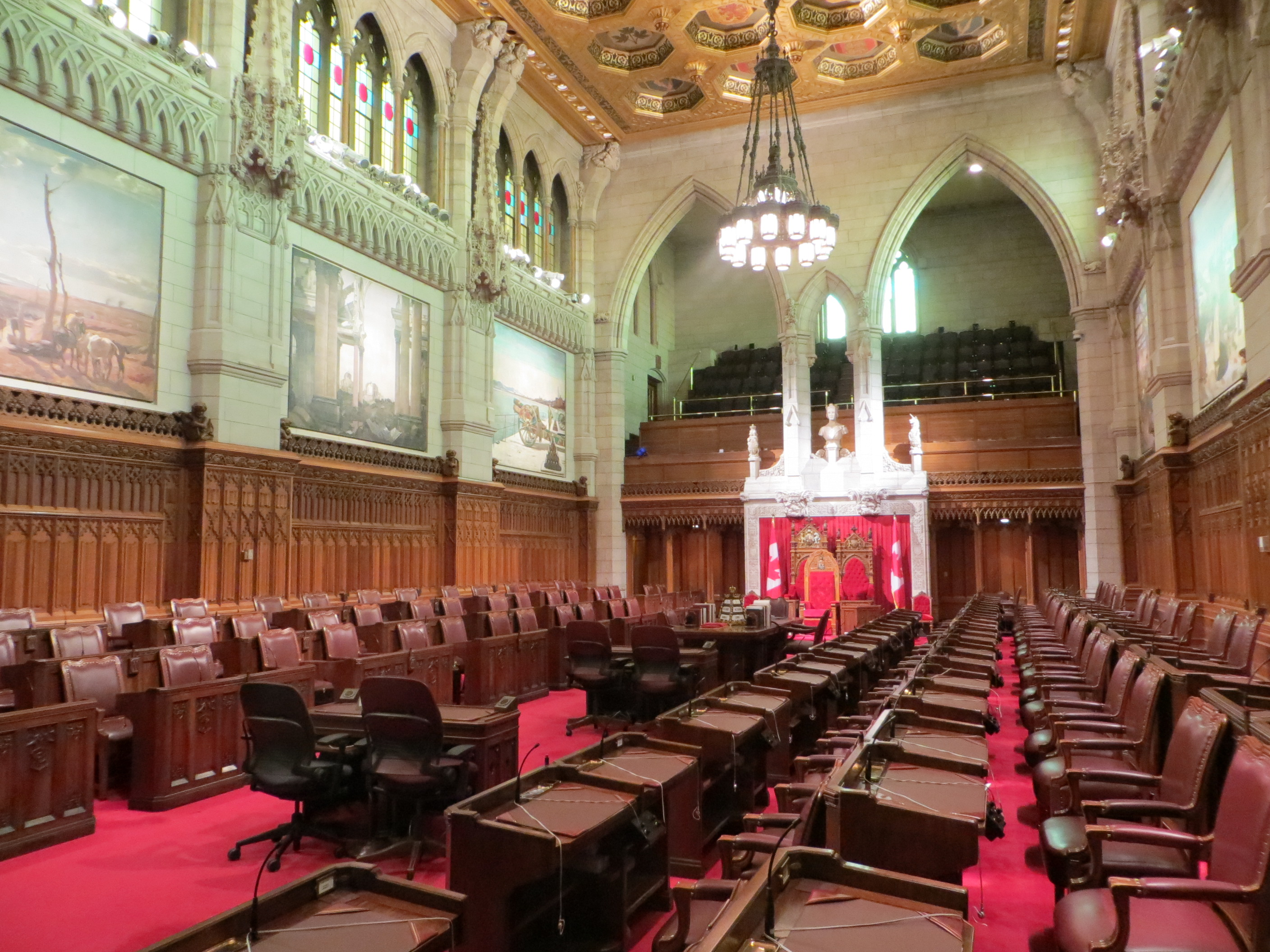
The Senate, where bills must be passed to come into force

Like the British House of Commons, the Canadian House of Commons has asserted full control over public finances, relying in part on the historical development of these principles in the United Kingdom. For example, Standing Order 80 of the Canadian House of Commons asserts the basic principle that the House of Commons has full control over the public finances:

Commons alone grant aids and supplies.
80(1) All aids and supplies granted to the Sovereign by the Parliament of Canada are the sole gift of the House of Commons, and all bills for granting such aids and supplies ought to begin with the House, as it is the undoubted right of the House to direct, limit, and appoint in all such bills, the ends, purposes, considerations, conditions, limitations and qualifications of such grants, which are not alterable by the Senate.

Standing Order 80 echoes the language of a similar resolution passed by the English House of Commons in 1678.

The Senate takes a somewhat different view on this issue. The Senate recognises that taxation and appropriation bills can only be introduced in the House of Commons, with the recommendation from the Governor General. However, all bills introduced in the House of Commons, including money bills, require passage by the Senate in order to become law. The Senate has asserted that while it cannot introduce money bills, it has a power to amend them, provided the amendments do not increase the taxation or appropriation amounts. In the Senate's view, its power to amend money bills allows it to reduce taxation and appropriation amounts in a bill. The Senate has also asserted that it is not bound to pass financial legislation, unlike the House of Lords in the British Parliament. On occasion, the Senate has passed amendments or rejected a money bill. (Note: In 1913, the Senate rejected the Naval Aid Bill, which would have authorised the federal government to spend $35 million (approximately $978,000,000 in 2025) for the construction of battlecruisers or battleships for the Royal Navy.)

In 1990, the Liberal party, in opposition in the House of Commons, threatened to use its majority in the Senate to defeat the bill to implement the goods and services tax. In response, the Progressive Conservative government of Prime Minister Brian Mulroney appointed eight additional senators under section 26 of the Constitution Act to ensure passage of the bill.

== Relationship to Section 54 ==
Section 53 is balanced by section 54 of the Act, which requires that any tax or appropriation bills must be accompanied by a recommendation from the Governor General. The recommendation by the Governor General is always on the advice of the federal Cabinet. The combined effect of these two sections is joint control over public finance, reconciling the principles that only the elected House of Commons can authorize taxation and spending, with the need for budgetary control by the executive.

== Application to the provinces ==
=== Effect of section 90 ===
Although section 53 only refers to the House of Commons, it also applies to the provincial legislative assemblies. Section 90 of the act provides that several of the provisions relating to the federal Parliament, including "the provisions relating to appropriation and tax bills", also apply to the provincial legislatures. At Confederation, three of the four original provinces had appointed upper houses, similar to the Senate. Since the abolition of the Legislative Council of Quebec in 1968, all of the provincial legislatures are unicameral, leading one legal academic to state that this aspect of section 53 is spent.

=== Supreme Court cases ===
The Supreme Court of Canada has given guidance on the meaning of section 53 in two major taxation decisions, and its ongoing application to the provinces.

In Re Eurig Estate, a majority of the Court held that section 53 implements the principle of "no taxation without representation". Taxation measures must be authorised by legislation. The majority found that a probate fee imposed by an Ontario order-in-council had not been authorised by legislation, and therefore did not comply with section 53.

In a subsequent case, also from Ontario, Ontario English Catholic Teachers’ Assn. v. Ontario (Attorney General), the Court held that a law can delegate to the Cabinet the power to impose a tax by order-in-council, provided the delegation is clear and express.

== Related provisions of the Constitution Act, 1867 ==
Section 54 of the Act provides that the House of Commons is not to proceed with a money bill unless the Governor General recommends the bill as necessary for the public finances.

Section 90 of the Act applies various provisions of the Act to the provincial governments, including "provisions relating to appropriation and tax bills".
