= Section 8 of the Constitution Act, 1867 =

Provision of the Constitution of Canada

British North America Act, 1867

Section 8 of the Constitution Act, 1867 (French: article 8 de la Loi constitutionnelle de 1867) is a provision of the Constitution of Canada that requires a national census every ten years.

The Constitution Act, 1867 is the constitutional statute that established Canada. Originally enacted by the British Parliament under the name the British North America Act, 1867, it remains the foundational statute of the Constitution of Canada and forms part of the supreme law of the country. Following Patriation of the Constitution in 1982, the Act was renamed the Constitution Act, 1867 and may since be amended only in Canada, under the amending formula set out in the Constitution Act, 1982.

== Constitution Act, 1867 ==
The Constitution Act, 1867 is part of the Constitution of Canada and thus part of the supreme law of Canada. The Act sets out the constitutional framework of Canada, including the structure of the federal government and the distribution of powers between the federal government and the provinces. It was the product of extensive negotiations among the provinces of British North America at the Charlottetown Conference in 1864, the Quebec Conference in 1864, and the London Conference in 1866, followed by consultations with the British government in 1867. The Act was enacted by the British Parliament in 1867 and brought under full Canadian control through Patriation in 1982, at which point it was renamed. Since Patriation, the Act may be amended only in Canada under the formula set out in the Constitution Act, 1982.

== Text of section 8 ==
Section 8 reads:

Decennial Census
8 In the general Census of the Population of Canada which is hereby required to be taken in the Year One thousand eight hundred and seventy-one, and in every Tenth Year, thereafter, the respective Populations of the Four Provinces shall be distinguished.

Section 8 appears in Part II of the Constitution Act, 1867, which deals with the union of the provinces.

== Legislative history ==
Section 8 derives in part from the census provisions of the Quebec Resolutions. The requirement for a decennial census is closely tied to the redistribution of seats in the House of Commons. The Quebec Resolutions provided that a census should be conducted every ten years beginning in 1871, that no redistribution of seats could occur until after the 1871 census, and that a redistribution should follow every subsequent decennial census. The London Resolutions contained provisions to similar effect. The census requirement for the purposes of redistribution appeared in the first rough draft of the bill, was modified in the initial draft, and took its final form in the version introduced before the British Parliament.

Section 8 has not been amended since the Act came into force in 1867.

== Purpose and interpretation ==
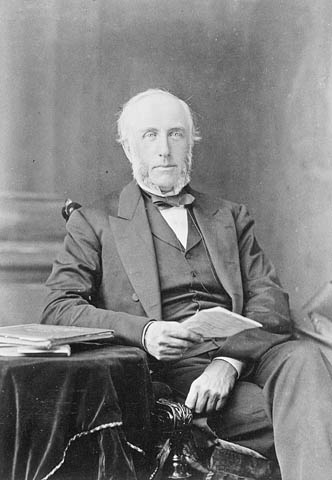
George Brown, advocate for representation by population

At Confederation, the population imbalance between Canada East (now Quebec) and Canada West (now Ontario) was among the principal political grievances driving the push for a new constitutional arrangement. Although Canada East and Canada West held equal representation in the Parliament of the Province of Canada, Canada West had a substantially larger population. George Brown, a leading Reformer in Canada West, campaigned for several years on the principle of "rep by pop" — that each section's representation in Parliament should be proportional to its population. That principle was enshrined in the Quebec Resolutions, drafted by the Fathers of Confederation at the Quebec Conference in 1864, which provided that representation in the lower house of the new Parliament would be based on each province's share of the national population.

Section 8 implemented this principle by requiring a national census every ten years, with the total population disaggregated by province, thereby enabling the allocation of seats in the House of Commons in proportion to each province's share of the national population.

== Related provisions of the Constitution Act, 1867 ==
Section 51 requires a redistribution of seats in the House of Commons every ten years, following each decennial census.

Section 52 provides that the House of Commons may be increased in size, provided that any such increase does not alter the proportionate representation of the provinces.
