= Section 36 of the Constitution Act, 1867 =

Provision of the Constitution of Canada

British North America Act, 1867

Section 36 of the Constitution Act, 1867 (French: article 36 de la Loi constitutionnelle de 1867) is a provision of the Constitution of Canada relating to the voting procedure in the Senate of Canada.

The Constitution Act, 1867 is the constitutional statute which established Canada. Originally named the British North America Act, 1867, the Act continues to be the foundational statute for the Constitution of Canada, although it has been amended many times since 1867. It is now recognised as part of the supreme law of Canada.

== Constitution Act, 1867 ==
The Constitution Act, 1867 is part of the Constitution of Canada and thus part of the supreme law of Canada. The Act sets out the constitutional framework of Canada, including the structure of the federal government and the powers of the federal government and the provinces. It was the product of extensive negotiations between the provinces of British North America at the Charlottetown Conference in 1864, the Quebec Conference in 1864, and the London Conference in 1866. Those conferences were followed by consultations with the British government in 1867. The Act was then enacted in 1867 by the British Parliament under the name the British North America Act, 1867. In 1982 the Act was brought under full Canadian control through the Patriation of the Constitution, and was renamed the Constitution Act, 1867. Since Patriation the Act can only be amended in Canada, under the amending formula set out in the Constitution Act, 1982.

== Text of section 36 ==
Section 36 reads:

Voting in Senate
36 Questions arising in the Senate shall be decided by a Majority of Voices, and the Speaker shall in all Cases have a Vote, and when the Voices are equal the Decision shall be deemed to be in the Negative.

Section 36 is found in Part IV of the Constitution Act, 1867, dealing with the federal legislative power. It has not been amended since the Act was enacted in 1867.

== Legislative history ==
The power of the speaker to vote in proceedings was addressed in both the Quebec Resolutions of 1864, and the London Resolutions of 1866. Both proposed that the speaker would have a casting vote, and would only vote in the case of an equality of votes.

That approach was followed in the first two drafts of the bill. The third draft changed the approach, and proposed giving the speaker the same right to vote as the other senators, with a measure defeated if there were an equality of votes. That approach was adopted in the final draft, with some changes in wording, becoming the version enacted as section 36.

== Purpose and interpretation ==
This section provides the Speaker of the Senate with a deliberative vote. The Speaker, like any other member of the Senate, can vote on any matter before the Senate. In the event of a tied vote, the matter is defeated. The Speaker does not have a casting vote to resolve a tie.

This provision is modelled on the voting practice in the British House of Lords, where the Lord Chancellor had the right to vote on any matter, with a tie resulting in the defeat of the matter. This practice continues after the reforms to the House of Lords, with the Lord Speaker having a deliberative vote.

The deliberative vote of the Speaker of the Senate is different from the casting vote of the Speaker of the House of Commons, who only votes in the case of a tie.

=== Tied votes ===
Tied votes are rare in the Senate, but they do occur. One notable example occurred in 1991, with Bill C-43 of 1990, relating to abortion. In 1988, the Supreme Court of Canada had held in R v Morgentaler that the abortion provisions of the Criminal Code were unconstitutional. Bill C-43, introduced by the Progressive Conservative government of Brian Mulroney, would have recriminalised abortions in certain cases. The bill passed the House of Commons on May 29, 1990 on a free vote (140 to 130), but was defeated in the Senate on January 31, 1991 on a tie vote (43 to 43). Speaker Guy Charbonneau did not vote on the bill.

== Related provisions ==
Section 49 of the Act provides that the Speaker of the House of Commons only votes in the case of a tie.
