= Section 52 of the Constitution Act, 1867 =

Provision of the Constitution of Canada

British North America Act, 1867

Section 52 of the Constitution Act, 1867 (French: article 52 de la Loi constitutionnelle de 1867) is a provision of the Constitution of Canada which gives the federal Parliament the power to increase the number of members in the House of Commons, provided any increase respects the principle of proportionate provincial representation in the House of Commons.

The Constitution Act, 1867 is the constitutional statute which established Canada. Originally named the British North America Act, 1867, the Act continues to be the foundational statute for the Constitution of Canada, although it has been amended many times since 1867. It is now recognised as part of the supreme law of Canada.

== Constitution Act, 1867 ==
The Constitution Act, 1867 is part of the Constitution of Canada and thus part of the "supreme law of Canada". The Act sets out the constitutional framework of Canada, including the structure of the federal government and the powers of the federal government and the provinces. It was the product of extensive negotiations between the provinces of British North America at the Charlottetown Conference in 1864, the Quebec Conference in 1864, and the London Conference in 1866. Those conferences were followed by consultations with the British government in 1867. The Act was then enacted by the British Parliament under the name the British North America Act, 1867. In 1982 the Act was brought under full Canadian control through the Patriation of the Constitution, and was renamed the Constitution Act, 1867. Since Patriation, the Act can only be amended in Canada, under the amending formula set out in the Constitution Act, 1982.

== Text of section 52 ==
Section 52 reads:

Increase of Number of House of Commons
52 The Number of Members of the House of Commons may be from Time to Time increased by the Parliament of Canada, provided the proportionate Representation of the Provinces prescribed by this Act is not thereby disturbed.

Section 52 is found in Part IV of the Constitution Act, 1867, dealing with the legislative powers of the federal government. It has not been amended since the Act was enacted in 1867.

== Legislative history ==
Section 52 has its origins in resolution 25 of the Quebec Resolutions of 1864. The resolution stated that the general Parliament could increase the number of members in the House of Commons, "regard being had to the proportionate rights then existing." The same wording was set out in resolution 24 of the London Resolutions.

The same principle was set out in the rough draft of the bill, prepared by a sub-committee of the four provincial attorneys general, after the London Resolutions were completed. (Note: The four attorneys general were John A. Macdonald, Canada West; George-Étienne Cartier, Canada East; William Alexander Henry, Nova Scotia; and Charles Fisher, New Brunswick.) The provision took final form in the initial draft of the bill, which was ultimately adopted as section 52.

== Purpose and interpretation ==
One of the driving forces towards Confederation in the Province of Canada was that the two divisions, Canada East (now Quebec) and Canada West (now Ontario), had equal representation in the Parliament of the Province of Canada, regardless of population shifts. By the early 1860s, Canada West had a significantly higher population than Canada East, but each section had the same political strength. This arrangement led to considerable political instability.

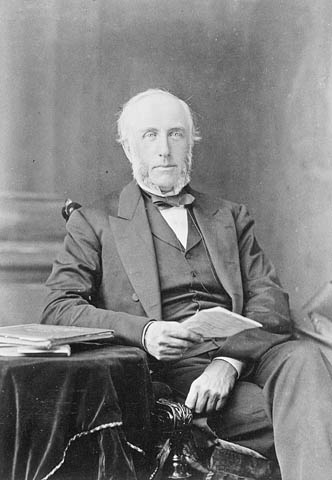
George Brown, advocate for representation by population

George Brown, a leader of the Reformers of Canada West and ultimately a Father of Confederation, campaigned strongly for "representation by population", namely that the representation of each section in the provincial Parliament would be tied to population. However, so long as the provincial Parliament had full jurisdiction over both sections of the Province, this option was not acceptable to French Canadians in Canada East. They feared that they would be overwhelmed by policies favouring English-Canadians, who would have an overall majority under rep-by-pop. This political problem was one of the factors which led the politicians in the Province of Canada to consider types of federalism, either a broad federation of all of the eastern British North American provinces, or a more limited federation of Canada East and Canada West within the Province of Canada.

Section 52 of the Act implements this principle of representation by population. The federal Parliament is given the power to increase the total number of seats in the House of Commons, provided the increased number of seats are distributed according to the principle of proportionate representation, set out in section 51 of the Act.

The proportionate representation in the House of Commons is considered a fundamental principle of the structure of the federal system and cannot be changed unilaterally by the federal Parliament. The principle of proportionate representation can only be changed by a constitutional amendment consented to by the two houses of the federal Parliament, and the legislative assemblies of at least two-thirds of the provinces, having at least fifty per cent of the population of the provinces. This requirement is set out in the constitutional amendment formula of the Constitution Act, 1982.

== Related provisions of the Constitution Act, 1867 ==
Section 8 of the Act provides that in each decennial census, the population of each province will be set out separately.

Section 37 of the Act sets out the current distribution of House of Commons seats among the provinces.

Section 51 of the Act provides that there will be a redistribution of seats in the House of Commons every ten years, after the decennial census.
