= Section 91 of the Constitution Act, 1867 =

Provision of the Constitution of Canada

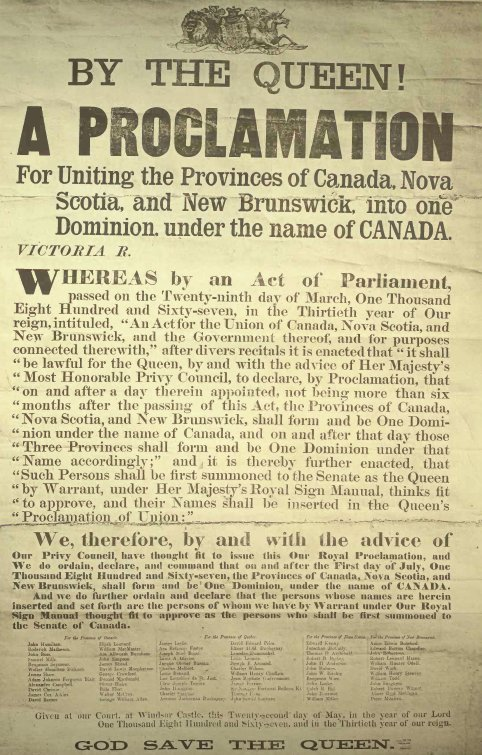
Proclamation bringing the Constitution Act into force, July 1, 1867

Section 91 of the Constitution Act, 1867 (French: article 91 de la Loi constitutionnelle de 1867) is a provision in the Constitution of Canada that sets out the legislative powers of the federal Parliament. The federal powers in section 91 are balanced by the list of provincial legislative powers set out in section 92 of the Constitution Act, 1867. The dynamic tension between these two sets of legislative authority is generally known as the division of powers. The interplay between the two lists of powers has been the source of much constitutional litigation since Canadian Confederation in 1867.

The Constitution Act, 1867 is the constitutional statute which established Canada. Originally named the British North America Act, 1867, the act continues to be the foundational statute for the Constitution of Canada, although it has been amended many times since 1867. It is now recognised as part of the supreme law of Canada.

== Constitution Act, 1867 ==
The Constitution Act, 1867 is part of the Constitution of Canada and thus part of the supreme law of Canada. The Act sets out the constitutional framework of Canada, including the structure of the federal government and the powers of the federal government and the provinces. It was the product of extensive negotiations between the provinces of British North America at the Charlottetown Conference in 1864, the Quebec Conference in 1864, and the London Conference in 1866. Those conferences were followed by consultations with the British government in 1867. The Act was then enacted by the British Parliament under the name the British North America Act, 1867. In 1982 the Act was brought under full Canadian control through the Patriation of the Constitution, and was renamed the Constitution Act, 1867. Since Patriation, the Act can only be amended in Canada, under the amending formula set out in the Constitution Act, 1982.

== Text of section 91 ==
Section 91 reads:

Legislative Authority of Parliament of Canada
91 It shall be lawful for the Queen, by and with the Advice and Consent of the Senate and House of Commons, to make Laws for the Peace, Order, and good Government of Canada, in relation to all Matters not coming within the Classes. of Subjects by this Act assigned exclusively to the Legislatures of the Provinces; and for greater Certainty, but not so as to restrict the Generality of the foregoing Terms of this Section, it is hereby declared that (notwithstanding anything in this Act) the exclusive Legislative Authority of the Parliament of Canada extends to all Matters coming within the Classes of Subjects next hereinafter enumerated; that is to say,—

1. Repealed.
1A. The Public Debt and Property.
2. The Regulation of Trade and Commerce.
2A. Unemployment insurance.
3. The raising of Money by any Mode or System of Taxation.
4. The borrowing of Money on the Public Credit.
5. Postal Service.
6. The Census and Statistics.
7. Militia, Military and Naval Service, and Defence.
8. The fixing of and providing for the Salaries and Allowances of Civil and other Officers of the Government of Canada.
9. Beacons, Buoys, Lighthouses, and Sable Island.
10. Navigation and Shipping.
11. Quarantine and the Establishment and Maintenance of Marine Hospitals.
12. Sea Coast and Inland Fisheries.
13. Ferries between a Province and any British or Foreign Country or between Two Provinces.
14. Currency and Coinage.
15. Banking, Incorporation of Banks, and the Issue of Paper Money.
16. Savings Banks.
17. Weights and Measures.
18. Bills of Exchange and Promissory Notes.
19. Interest.
20. Legal Tender.
21. Bankruptcy and Insolvency.
22. Patents of Invention and Discovery.
23. Copyrights.
24. Indians, and Lands reserved for the Indians.
25. Naturalization and Aliens.
26. Marriage and Divorce.
27.The Criminal Law, except the Constitution of Courts of Criminal Jurisdiction, but including the Procedure in Criminal Matters.
28. The Establishment, Maintenance, and Management of Penitentiaries.
29. Such Classes of Subjects as are expressly excepted in the Enumeration of the Classes of Subjects by this Act assigned exclusively to the Legislatures of the Provinces.

And any Matter coming within any of the Classes of Subjects enumerated in this Section shall not be deemed to come within the Class of Matters of a local or private Nature comprised in the Enumeration of the Classes of Subjects by this Act assigned exclusively to the Legislatures of the Provinces.

Section 91 is found in Part VI of the Constitution Act, 1867, dealing with the distribution of legislative powers between the federal and provincial governments. It has been expressly amended three times since 1867.

== Legislative history ==
=== Quebec Resolutions: October 1864 ===
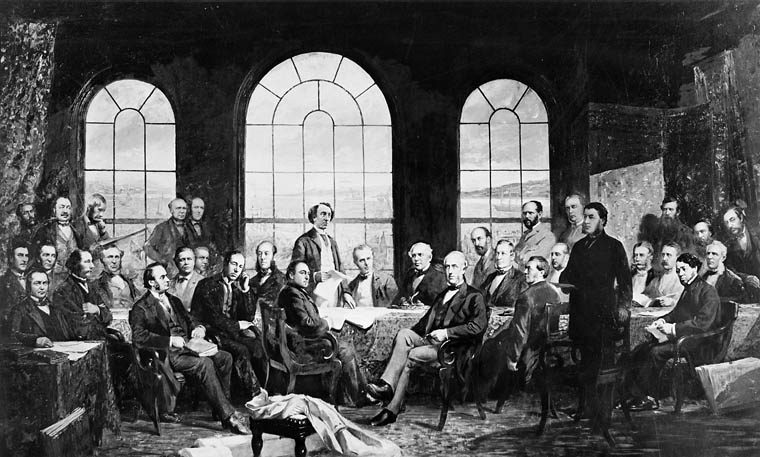
Quebec Conference, 1864

Section 91 has its origins in the Quebec Resolutions which were prepared by the Quebec Conference in the fall of 1864. The proposed powers of the federal Parliament were set out in resolution 29, although there were some differences from that initial draft and the final version in section 91. The main differences were as follows:

- Customs, excise, and taxation in general were set out in three clauses in the initial list from the Quebec Conference. The three types of taxes were combined into one clause in the act.
- Regulation of inter-provincial transportation and communication, including ships, railways, canals and telegraphs, as well as works declared to be for the general advantage, were all included in the initial list of federal powers. In the act, they were set out as exceptions to the provincial category of local works and undertakings. Federal jurisdiction over those subjects is provided by section 91(29).
- The proposed list included the power for the federal Parliament to make uniform laws for Ontario, Nova Scotia and New Brunswick relating to property and civil rights and court procedure. That provision eventually became section 94 of the act.
- The proposed list gave the federal Parliament the power to create a general court of appeal for the country. That became section 101 of the act.
- Immigration and agriculture were in the proposed list of federal powers, and also in the proposed list of provincial powers. They were instead made concurrent federal and provincial powers, in section 95 of the act.
- The final clause of the list in resolution 29 established that Parliament had jurisdiction over all matters of a general character that were not specially and exclusively reserved to the provinces. A variant of this residual powers clause is included in the introduction to section 91 of the act, in the "peace, order, and good government" power.
- penitentiaries were not included in the proposed list of federal powers and instead were included in the proposed list of provincial powers. That subject was moved to the federal powers during the drafting process and is included in the act.

=== London Resolutions: December 1866 ===
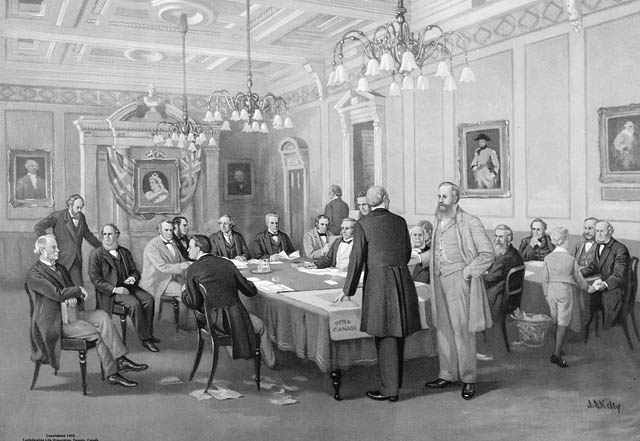
London Conference, 1866

The next stage in the drafting process was the London Resolutions, prepared by the delegates from the British North American provinces at the London Conference of 1866. There were a few changes from the Quebec Resolutions:

- The three clauses relating to customs, excise, and taxation were combined into one clause, in wording similar to the final version in clause 91(3) of the act.
- The subject of statistics was added to the clause for the census.
- Sable Island was added to the clause dealing with beacons, buoys, and lighthouses.
- A new subject was added, the establishment, maintenance and management of penitentiaries, in wording ultimately used in the act.
- The provision authorising the federal Parliament to enact uniform laws in areas of provincial jurisdiction was amended, adding a statement that once Parliament enacted such laws, only Parliament could legislate in that area. That wording did not make it into the final version of section 94 of the act.

=== Drafting process ===
Following the preparation of the London Resolutions in December 1866, the drafting process began. The members of the conference were involved in that process, working with the Colonial Secretary, Lord Carnarvon, and the parliamentary drafter. One of John A. Macdonald's secretaries, Joseph Pope, subsequently published documents relating to the Confederation process, including five drafts of the bill, publishing them in 1895.

Pope's collection was the basis for a subsequent collection, published by G.P. Browne in 1968, and re-issued with a new introduction by Janet Ajzenstat in 2009. Browne and Ajzenstat speculate that the number of drafts collected by Pope may not be complete, and that his notes suggest that there was a draft between January 23 and February 2, 1867 which is not in his text.

==== Rough draft: January 1867 ====
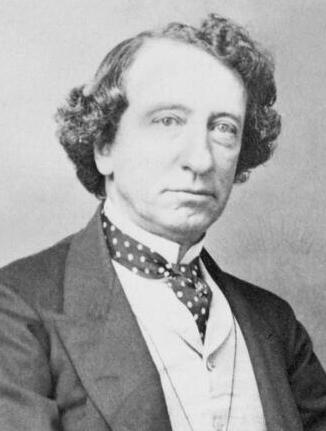
John A. Macdonald, Canada West

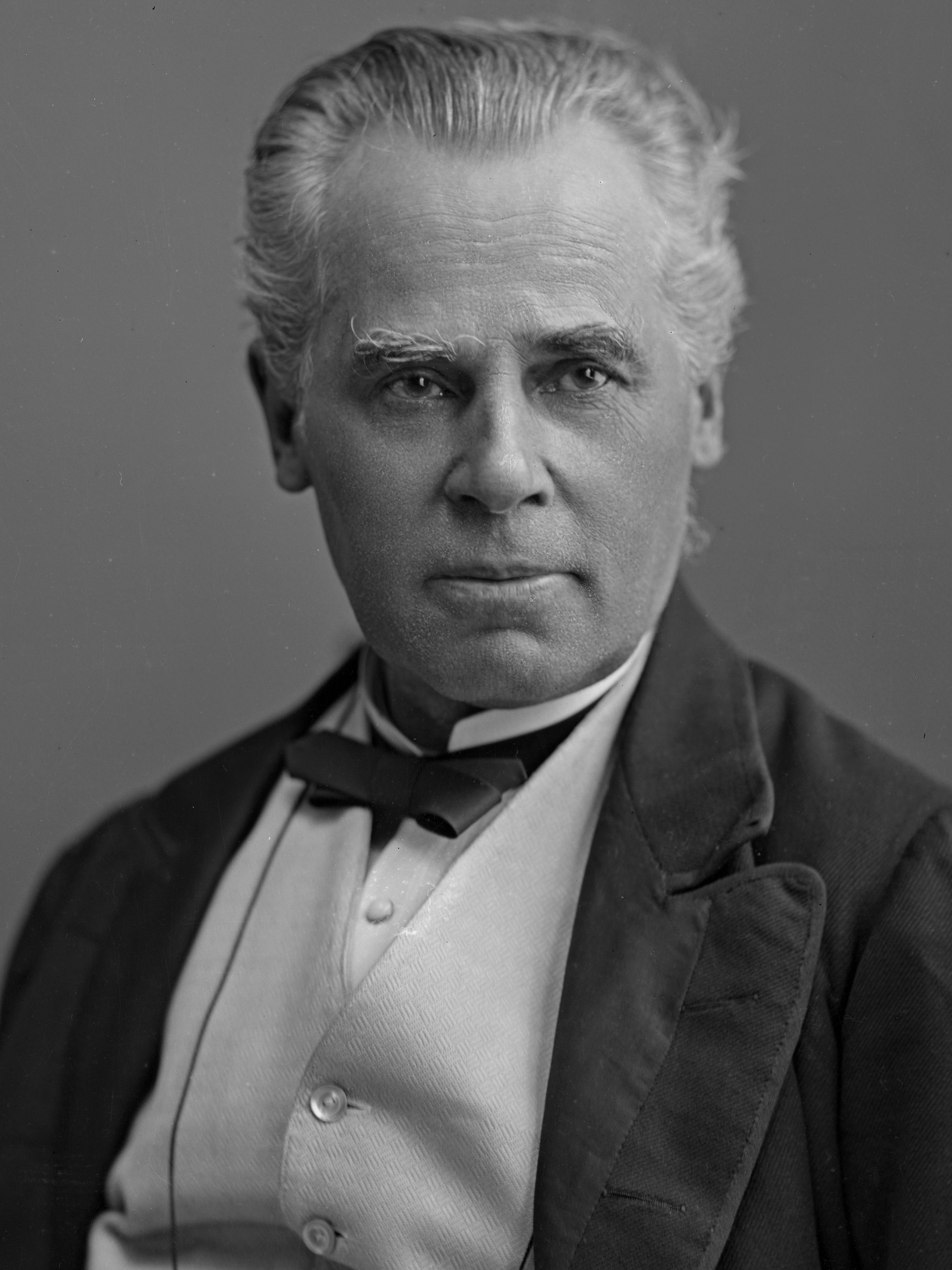
George-Étienne Cartier, Canada East

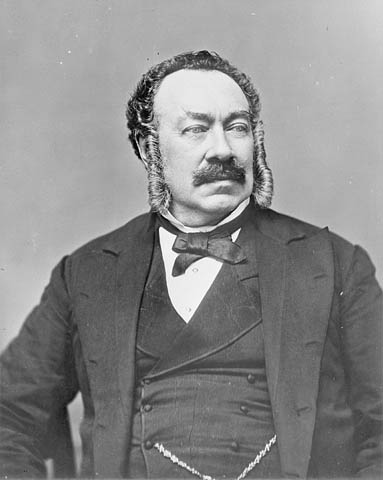
William Alexander Henry, Nova Scotia

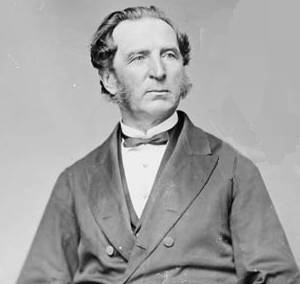
Charles Fisher, New Brunswick

Following the approval of the London Resolutions, the delegates to the London Conference appointed the four provincial attorneys general as a committee to prepare a rough draft of the proposed bill. (Note: The four attorneys general were John A. Macdonald, Canada West; George-Étienne Cartier, Canada East; William Alexander Henry, Nova Scotia; and Charles Fisher, New Brunswick.) There were some differences in substance between that draft and the London Resolutions:

- the provision authorising the establishment of a general court of appeal was expanded, to include the creation of additional courts "in order to the due execution of the laws of Parliament".
- a new provision was added, to empower the federal Parliament to enact laws for the salaries and allowances of the provincial governors, federal officials and judges, the judges of the superior, county and district courts, and admiralty judges, where they were paid by salaries.
- the previous provision giving the federal Parliament jurisdiction over matters not assigned to the provinces was expanded, to give Parliament jurisdiction to enact laws for the "peace, welfare, and good government of the Confederation", which would take priority over provincial laws. The new wording also provided that in areas of concurrent jurisdiction, federal laws would take priority.

==== Initial draft: January 23, 1867 ====
The next step was the initial draft prepared by the British parliamentary drafter, dated January 23, 1867. There were again some differences:

- the provision establishing the general legislative power of the federal Parliament was moved from the end of the list to an expanded introductory clause at the beginning of the list, with "peace, order, and good government" substituted for the previous wording of "peace, welfare, and good government".
- the four headings relating to inter-provincial transportation, canals, telegraphs, works declared to be of the general advantage, and interprovincial and international ferries were all taken out of the list of federal powers and instead listed as exceptions to the provincial jurisdiction over local works and undertakings. A new head of power at the end of the federal list gave Parliament jurisdiction over matters expressly excepted from the list of provincial powers.
- the provision for federal uniform law relating to property and civil rights and court procedure in Ontario, Nova Scotia and New Brunswick was taken out of the general list of federal powers and made into a separate stand-alone provision.
- the provision for the creation of a general court of appeal was taken out of the list of federal legislative powers and made a separate stand-alone provision. The provision for the creation of additional courts was taken out.
- agriculture and immigration were taken out of the lists of federal and provincial legislative powers, and made concurrent powers of legislation.
- the provision authorising the federal Parliament to "fix and provide" for the salaries of the provincial governors (now termed "superintendents") was taken out of the list of federal legislative power and made a stand-alone provision. There was no provision for the salaries of federal officials or the judges. A note from the drafter at the end of the draft suggested that could be left to colonial legislation, "unless there is some special Reason for having them inserted in the Imperial Act".
- a new closing paragraph was added to the list, stating that subjects coming within the matters assigned to the federal Parliament would be deemed not to come within the subject of property and civil rights assigned to the provinces.

==== Third draft: February 2, 1867 ====
The third draft was prepared by the conference in response to the initial draft prepared by the parliamentary drafter. All of the changes made by the parliamentary drafter to the list of federal legislative subjects were rejected and the previous provisions for the federal legislative powers were maintained.

==== Fourth draft: February, 1867 ====
The fourth draft was also prepared by the conference, and generally followed the proposed wording of the third draft, with two significant differences:

- the provision for legislative power over "quarantine" was expanded to include "the establishment and maintenance of marine hospitals".
- the general provision for federal jurisdiction over "peace, order, and good government" was moved to the introductory paragraph, as suggested by the parliamentary drafter in the initial draft.

==== Final Draft: February 9, 1867 ====
The final draft bill was prepared by the parliamentary drafter, with some changes from the previous draft:

- the salary power was divided into three different provisions. The power to set the salaries for federal officials was included in the general list (head 99(7a)), while the powers to set the salaries for the lieutenant governors and the judges were in two different clauses.
- inter-provincial and international ferries were restored to the general list.
- the power of the federal Parliament to legislate for uniform laws in Ontario, Nova Scotia, and New Brunswick was taken out of the general list and made a separate clause.
- the power to regulate agriculture, immigration, and works and undertakings was made a separate clause, granting concurrent power over these subject to both the federal Parliament and the provincial legislatures. The clause included a proviso that laws enacted by Parliament over agriculture, immigration, and works and undertakings relating to inter-provincial communication and transportation, steam ship lines between provinces and other countries, and works declared by Parliament to be for the general advantage would have priority over any provincial law that was repugnant to the federal law.

==== Differences between the final draft bill and the act ====
There were some further differences between the final draft bill and the act as enacted by the British Parliament. Some were simply stylistic. Due to some of the clauses from the earlier portion of the bill being moved towards the end of the act, the federal list became section 91 of the act, instead of clause 99 of the final draft. Heads 99(7a) and (11a) were renumbered as 91(8) and (13), so section 91 consists of twenty-nine heads of power.

There was one final change to the list of provincial powers which affected the federal powers.

- agriculture and immigration remained as a separate area of concurrent federal and provincial jurisdiction, with federal paramountcy.
- jurisdiction over works and undertakings was removed from the concurrent federal and provincial powers, with local works and undertakings added to the list of provincial power.
- works and undertakings relating to inter-provincial communication and transportation, steam ship lines between provinces and other countries, and works declared by Parliament to be for the general advantage were set out as express exceptions to the concept of local works and undertakings.
- those exceptions now came under exclusive federal jurisdiction based on the final head of federal power, head 91(29).

== Amendments ==
=== Express amendments ===
Section 91 has been expressly amended three times since 1867.

In 1940, section 91 was amended by the addition of head 91(2A), "Unemployment insurance". That provision was added by the British Parliament on the request of the Canadian Senate and House of Commons, after unanimous agreement from the provincial governments. The amendment responded to the 1937 decision of the Judicial Committee of the Privy Council, the highest court for the British Empire, which had held that unemployment insurance was a matter of exclusive provincial jurisdiction. The new head 91(2A) instead assigned that jurisdiction to the federal Parliament.

In 1949, section 91 was again amended by the addition of a new provision which authorised the federal Parliament to enact certain limited types of constitutional amendments, relating to the internal structure of the federal government. That amending power was set out as a new version of head 91(1). It was enacted by the British Parliament, on the request of the Canadian House of Commons and Senate. The previous version of head 91(1), dating back to 1867, had created federal jurisdiction over "The Public Debt and Property". That provision was renumbered as head 91(1A), and remains in force.

The third amendment was in 1982. As part of the Patriation amendments, the 1949 version of head 91(1) was repealed by the Constitution Act, 1982, which contains a comprehensive amending formula. Section 44 of that Act is the equivalent to the repealed version of head 91(1), authorising limited amendments to the internal structure of the federal government.

=== Implicit amendments ===
There have also been constitutional amendments which have implicitly amended the scope of section 91. For instance, the Statute of Westminster, 1931 provided that the federal Parliament had the power to legislate extraterritorially. That amendment removed a previous restriction on Parliament’s legislative powers under section 91.

== Background and interpretation ==
In a federation, the allocation of powers between the central government and the regional governments is always a major issue. The approach taken by the Fathers of Confederation was to create two lists of powers: the list of federal powers, set out primarily in section 91, and the list of provincial powers, set out primarily in section 92. (Note: There is also a small group of concurrent powers, which both the federal and provincial governments can regulate: agriculture and immigration, old age pensions, and certain taxes on natural resources.)

The interplay between the federal powers in section 91 and provincial powers in section 92 has been one of the most heavily litigated issues since Confederation in 1867. The relationship between the federal and provincial powers is generally referred to as the division of powers. (Note: In Canadian constitutional law, division of powers means federalism issues, not the separation of powers.) Canadian constitutional law texts devote considerable attention to the division of powers.

Both the federal powers and the provincial powers are exclusive, not concurrent. A subject matter which falls within federal jurisdiction therefore does not come within provincial jurisdiction, and vice versa. Canadian constitutional analysis uses the term ultra vires as shorthand for a matter that is outside the jurisdiction of a government, and intra vires for a matter that is within the jurisdiction of a government. Related constitutional doctrines such as paramountcy and inter-jurisdictional immunity are also used to assess the constitutionality of a law under the division of powers.

Although some of the Fathers of Confederation, such as John A. Macdonald, favoured a strong central government, other Fathers of Confederation, such as Oliver Mowat, were more inclined to broader provincial powers. Quebec has traditionally favoured stronger provincial powers. In the late 19th century and early 20th century, the Judicial Committee of the Privy Council issued a series of decisions which expanded provincial powers at the expense of federal powers.

== Additional sources of federal jurisdiction ==
Section 91 is not the only source of federal legislative authority, as there are other provisions of the Constitution Act, 1867 which confer legislative power on the federal Parliament:

- section 41 gives Parliament jurisdiction over the conduct of federal elections;
- section 91(29), when combined with the exceptions from provincial jurisdiction in section 92(10), gives Parliament jurisdiction over international and interprovincial works and undertakings, interprovincial and international shipping, and works declared by Parliament to be for the greater advantage of Canada;
- section 93(4) gives Parliament an exceptional jurisdiction to protect denominational and separate school rights;
- section 94 gives Parliament the power to legislate for uniform property and civil rights, if the provinces of Ontario, New Brunswick and Nova Scotia choose to transfer that jurisdiction to Parliament;
- section 94A gives Parliament the power to legislate on old age pensions and supplemental benefits, concurrent with provincial jurisdiction;
- section 95 gives Parliament the power to legislate with respect to agriculture and immigration, concurrent with provincial jurisdiction;
- section 101 gives Parliament the power to establish a "general court of appeal for Canada", as well as courts "for the better administration of the laws of Canada".

In addition, section 44 of the Constitution Act, 1982 gives Parliament the power to legislate for the internal legislative and executive structure of the federal government.
