= Province =

Administrative division within a country or state

A province is an administrative division within a country or state. The term derives from the ancient Roman provincia, which was the major territorial and administrative unit of the Roman Empire's territorial possessions outside Italy. The term province has since been adopted by many countries. In some countries with no actual provinces, "the provinces" is a metaphorical term meaning "outside the capital city".

While some provinces were produced artificially by colonial powers, others were formed around local groups with their own ethnic identities. Many have their own powers independent of central or federal authority, especially in Canada. In other countries, like China or France, provinces are the creation of central government, with very little autonomy.

== Etymology ==
The English word province is attested since about 1330 and derives from the 13th-century Old French province, which itself comes from the Latin word provincia, which referred to the sphere of authority of a magistrate, in particular, to a foreign territory.

A popular etymology is from Latin pro- ("on behalf of") and vincere ("to triumph" or "to take control of"). Thus a "province" would be a territory or function that a Roman magistrate held control of on behalf of his government. In fact, the word province is an ancient term from public law, which means: "office belonging to a magistrate". This agrees with the Latin term's earlier usage as a generic term for a jurisdiction under Roman law.

== History and culture ==
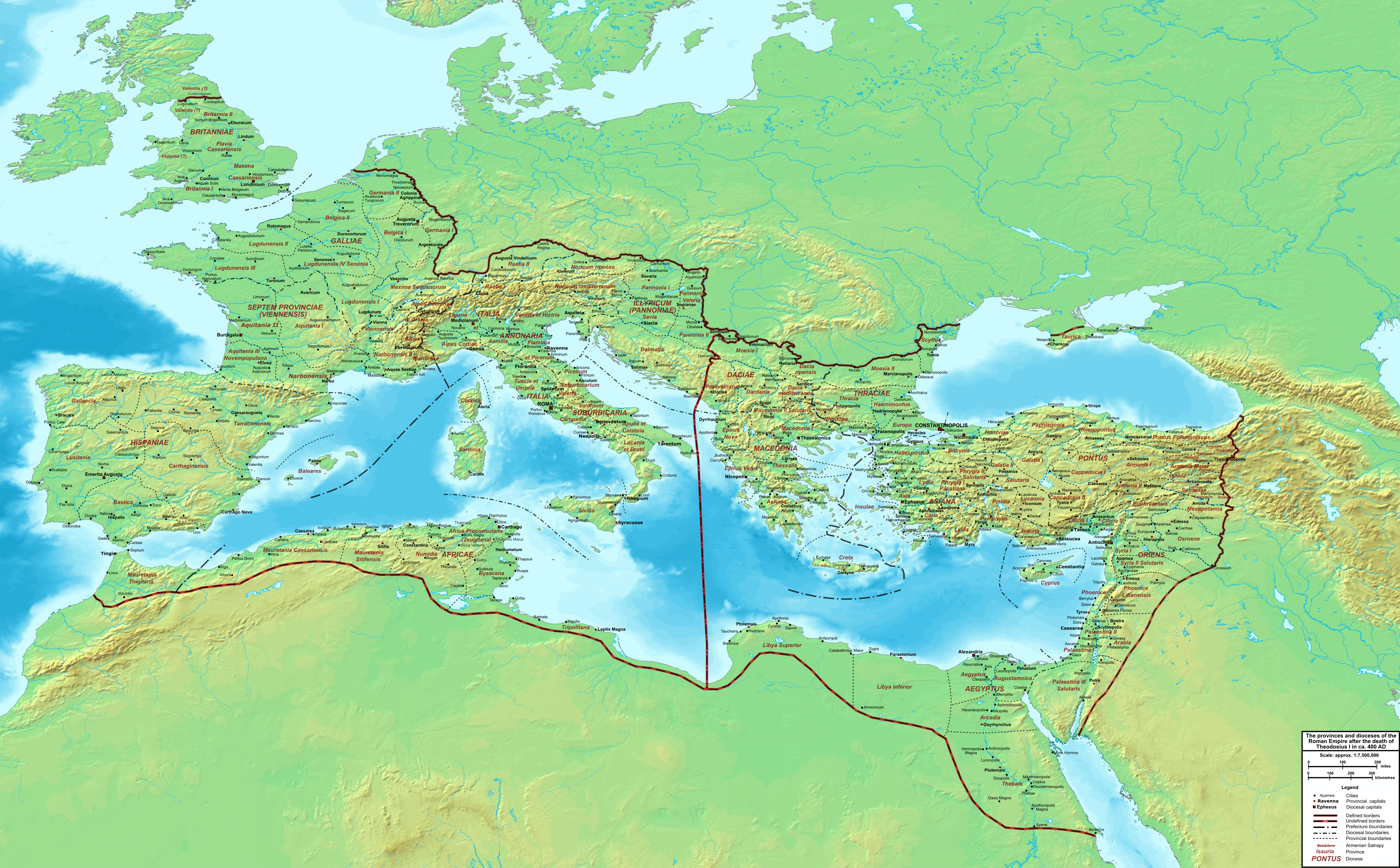
The Roman Empire and its administrative divisions, c. 395

In France, the expression en province still means "outside the Paris region". Equivalent expressions are used in Peru (en provincias, "outside the city of Lima"), Mexico (la provincia, "lands outside Mexico City"), Romania (în provincie, "outside the Bucharest region"), Poland (prowincjonalny, "provincial"), Bulgaria (в провинцията, v provincijata, "in the provinces" and провинциален, provincialen, "provincial"), the Netherlands (uit de provincie, "from outside Amsterdam", or "from outside the Randstad"), and the Philippines (tagá-probinsiya, "from outside Metro Manila", sa probinsiya, "in the provinces", or "in the countryside").

Before the French Revolution, France comprised a variety of jurisdictions (built around the early Capetian royal demesne), some being considered "provinces", though the term was also used colloquially for territories as small as a manor (châtellenie). Most commonly referred to as "provinces", however, were the Grands Gouvernements, generally former medieval feudal principalities, or agglomerations of such. Today, the expression en province is regularly replaced in the media by the more politically correct en région, région now being the term officially used for the secondary level of government.

In Italy, in provincia generally means "outside the biggest regional capitals" (like Rome, Milan, Naples, etc.).

For the United Kingdom, use of the word is often pejorative, assuming a stereotype of the denizens of the provinces to be less culturally aware than those in the capital.

In Mexico, while the term la provincia is commonly used to refer to areas outside Mexico City, it is increasingly viewed as pejorative by residents of other states. Mexico does not have provinces as administrative divisions, and the use of the term can imply a hierarchical or dismissive view of the rest of the country, reinforcing centralist attitudes and marginalizing regional identities.

The historic European provinces—built up of many small regions, called pays by the French and "cantons" by the Swiss, each with a local cultural identity and focused upon a market town—have been depicted by Fernand Braudel as the optimum-size political unit in pre-industrial Early Modern Europe. He asks, "Was the province not its inhabitants' true 'fatherland'?" Even centrally-organized France, an early nation-state, could collapse into autonomous provincial worlds under pressure, as during the sustained crisis of the French Wars of Religion (1562–98).

The British colonies in North America were often named provinces. Most (but not all) of the Thirteen Colonies that eventually formed the United States were called provinces. All declared themselves "states" when they became independent. The Connecticut Colony, the Delaware Colony, Rhode Island and the Colony of Virginia never used the title "province". The British colonies further north, which remained loyal to Britain and later confederated to form the original Canada, retained the title of "province" and are still known as such to the present day.

To 19th and 20th-century historians, in Europe, centralized government was a sign of modernity and political maturity. In the late 20th century, as the European Union drew nation-states closer together, centripetal forces seemed simultaneously to move countries toward more flexible systems of more localized, provincial governing entities under the overall European Union umbrella. Spain after Francisco Franco has been a "State of Autonomies", formally unitary but in fact functioning as a federation of Autonomous Communities, each exercising different powers.

While Serbia, the rump of former Yugoslavia, fought the separatists in the province of Kosovo, the United Kingdom, under the political principle of "devolution", produced (1998) local parliaments in Scotland, Wales and Northern Ireland. In ancient India, unlike the Mauryas, the Gupta Empire gave local areas a great deal of independence and divided the empire into 26 large provinces, styled as Bhukti, Pradesha and Bhoga.

== Legal aspects ==
In many federations and confederations, the province or state is not clearly subordinate to the national or central government. Rather, it is considered to be sovereign in regard to its particular set of constitutional functions. The central- and provincial-government functions, or areas of jurisdiction, are identified in a constitution. Those that are not specifically identified are called "residual powers". In a decentralized federal system (such as the United States and Australia) these residual powers lie at the provincial or state level, whereas in a centralized federal system (such as Canada) they are retained at the federal level.

Some of the enumerated powers can be quite important. For example, Canadian provinces are sovereign in regard to such important matters as property, civil rights, education, social welfare and medical services. The growth of the modern welfare state has resulted in these functions, assigned to the provinces, becoming more important compared to those assigned to the federal government and thus provincial governments have become more important than the Fathers of Confederation originally intended.

Canada's status as a federation of provinces under the Dominion of the British Empire rather than an independent country also had certain legal implications. Provinces could appeal court rulings over the heads of the Supreme Court of Canada to the Judicial Committee of the Privy Council in London. As well, provinces could bypass the Supreme Court and go directly to London from any Provincial Court. The Canadian Supreme Court tended to support the view that the Canadian Constitution was intended to create a powerful central government, but the Privy Council in London held the distinctly opposite view that the Constitution provided for stronger provincial powers. This provided an opportunity for forum shopping for provinces who opposed federal laws. Until appeals from Canada to the Privy Council were abolished in 1949, in legal disputes the provincial governments tended to win powers at the expense of the federal government.

In addition, while the Canadian federal government has unlimited taxing power while province governments are restricted to imposing direct taxes, the Canadian government introduced an income tax during World War I, and since it is a direct tax it also became a major revenue generator for provinces. In most provinces, the federal government now collects income tax for both levels of government and transfers to the provincial governments whatever surcharge they ask for. The sales tax also become a major revenue generator for provinces, so in 1991 the Canadian government introduced a Goods and Services Tax (GST) to share the revenues, which proved unpopular both with provincial governments and taxpayers. The Canadian government has tried to harmonize the two levels of sales taxes, but three provinces continue to impose a separate sales tax (British Columbia after harmonizing it, and shortly thereafter de-harmonizing it after it was struck down by a referendum), while the province of Alberta still does not impose a provincial sales tax.

The evolution of federations has created an inevitable tug-of-war between concepts of federal supremacy versus states' and provinces' rights. The historic division of responsibility in federal constitutions is inevitably subject to multiple overlaps. For example, when central governments, responsible for foreign policy, enter into international agreements in areas where the state or province is sovereign, such as the environment or health standards, agreements made at the national level can create jurisdictional overlap and conflicting laws. This overlap creates the potential for internal disputes that lead to constitutional amendments and judicial decisions that alter the balance of powers.

Though foreign affairs do not usually fall under a province's or a federal state's competency, some states allow them to legally conduct international relations on their own in matters of their constitutional prerogative and essential interest. Sub-national authorities have a growing interest in paradiplomacy, be it performed under a legal framework or as a trend informally admitted as legitimate by the central authorities.

In unitary states such as France and China, provinces are subordinate to the national, central government. In theory, the central government can create or abolish provinces within its jurisdiction. On the other hand, although Canada is now considered a federal state and not a confederation, in practice it is among the world's more decentralized federations. Canadian Confederation and the Constitution Act, 1867 conferred considerable power on the provincial governments which they often use to pursue their own goals independently of the federal government.

In Canada, local governments have been called "creatures of the province" because the authority of a local government derives solely from the provincial government. Provinces can create, merge, and dissolve local governments without the consent of the federal government or the people in the affected locality. Alberta in particular dissolved and merged hundreds of local governments during the 1940s and 1950s as a consequence of the Great Depression. Other provinces have arbitrarily merged and annexed independent suburbs to major Canadian cities such as Toronto or Montreal without the approval of local voters.

== Current provinces ==
Not all first-level political entities are termed "provinces." In Arab countries, the first administrative level of government—called a muhafazah—is usually translated as a "governorate." In Poland, the equivalent of "province" is "województwo," sometimes rendered in English as "voivodeship."

Historically, New Zealand was divided into provinces, each with its own Superintendent and Provincial Council, and with considerable responsibilities conferred on them. However, the colony (as it then was) never developed into a federation; instead, the provinces were abolished in 1876. The old provincial boundaries continue to be used to determine the application of certain public holidays. Over the years, when the central Government has created special-purpose agencies at a sub-national level, these have often tended to follow or approximate the old provincial boundaries. Current examples include the 16 Regions into which New Zealand is divided, and also the 21 District Health Boards. Sometimes the term the provinces is used to refer collectively to rural and regional parts of New Zealand, that is, those parts of the country lying outside some or all of the "main centres"—Auckland, Wellington, Christchurch, Hamilton and Dunedin.

=== Modern provinces ===
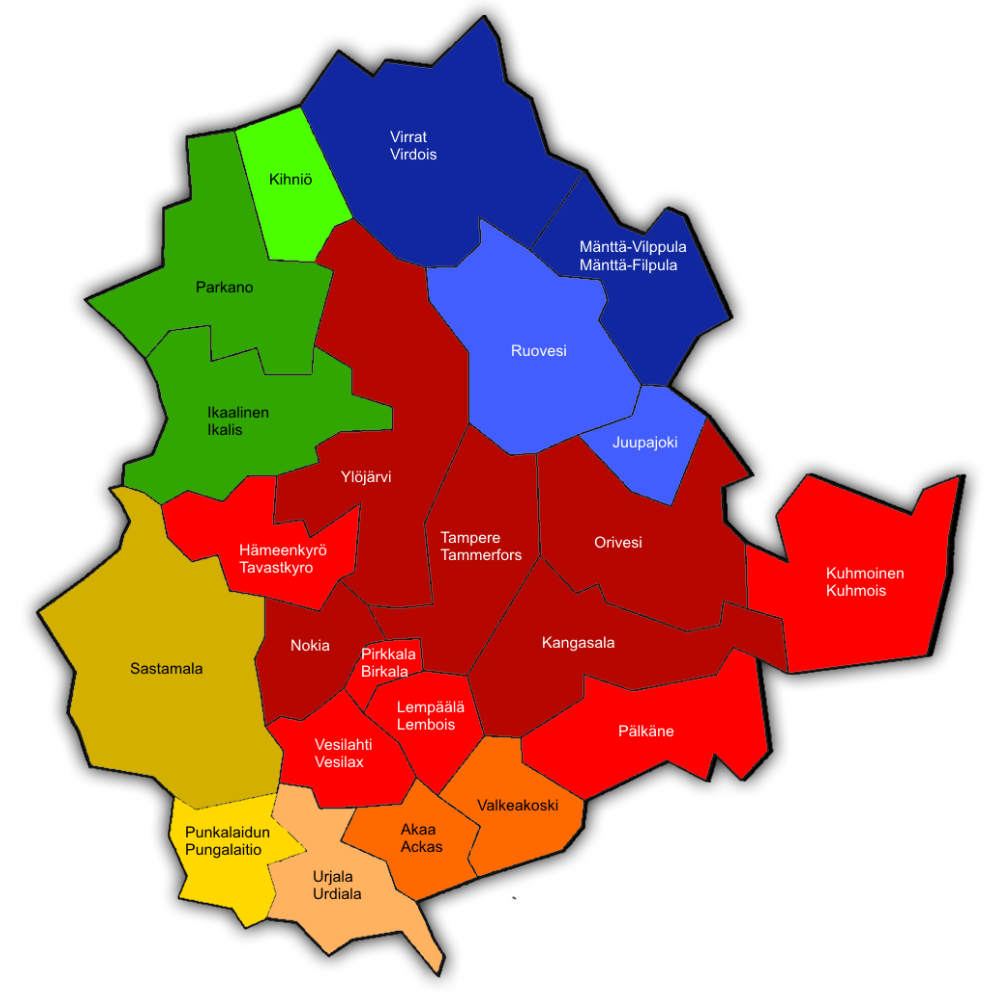
A map of the Pirkanmaa, the regional province (maakunta) in Finland, with the different colored sub-regions

In many countries, a province is a relatively small non-constituent level of sub-national government, such as a county in the United Kingdom. In China, a province is a sub-national region within a unitary state; this means that a province can be created or abolished by the national people's congress.

In some nations, a province (or its equivalent) is a first-level administrative unit of sub-national government—as in the Netherlands—and a large constituent autonomous area, as in Argentina, Canada, South Africa, and the Democratic Republic of the Congo. It can also be a constituent element of a federation, confederation, or republic.

In other nations—such as Belgium, Chile, Italy, Peru, the Philippines, and Spain—a province is a second-level administrative sub-division of a region (which is the first-order administrative sub-division of the nation). Italian provinces are mainly named after their principal town and comprise several administrative sub-divisions called comuni (communes). In Chile, they are referred to as comunas. Chile has 15 regions, subdivided into 53 provinces, of which each is run by a governor appointed by the president. Italy has 20 regions, subdivided into 14 metropolitan cities and 96 provinces. Peru has 25 regions, subdivided into 194 provinces. Spain has 17 autonomous communities and 2 autonomous cities, subdivided into 50 provinces.

The island of Ireland is divided into four historic provinces (see Provinces of Ireland), each of which is sub-divided into counties. These provinces are Connacht (in the west), Leinster (in the east), Munster (in the south) and, Ulster (in the north). Nowadays these provinces have little or no administrative function, though they do have sporting significance. Northern Ireland is frequently called "the Province" or "Ulster" in British media, although it includes just six of the nine counties of the original province.

From the 19th century, the Portuguese colonies were considered overseas provinces of Portugal.

Similarly, some overseas parts of the British Empire bore the colonial title of "province" (in a more Roman sense), such as the Province of Canada and the Province of South Australia (the latter, to distinguish it from the penal "colonies" elsewhere in Australia). Likewise, prior to the American Revolution, most of the original Thirteen Colonies in British America were provinces as well, such as the Province of Georgia and the Province of New Hampshire.

=== Canada ===
The constituent entities of Canada are known as provinces. Prior to confederation, the term province was used in reference to several British colonies situated in what is now Canada; such as the colonial Province of Quebec. In 1791, Quebec was split into two separate provinces, Lower Canada, and Upper Canada. The two colonies were later merged in 1841 to form the Province of Canada. From its separation from Nova Scotia in the 18th century, New Brunswick was known as His/Her Majesty's Province of New Brunswick. After Canadian Confederation in 1867, the term provinces continued to be used, in reference to the sub-national governments of Canada.

Because Canada is the second-largest country in the world by area, but has only 10 provinces, most Canadian provinces are very large—six of its ten provinces are larger than any country in Europe except Russia, and its largest province—Quebec, 1,542,056 km^{2} (595,391 sq mi)—is almost two and a half times as large as France—640,679 km^{2} (247,368 sq mi). Five provinces—Ontario, Quebec, New Brunswick, Nova Scotia and Prince Edward Island—have "counties" as administrative sub-divisions. The actual local government form can vary widely. In New Brunswick, Prince Edward Island, and in 9 of the 18 counties of Nova Scotia, county government has been abolished and has been superseded by another form of local government. New Brunswick and Prince Edward Island also have parishes within counties. Since the Canadian Constitution assigns local government to provincial jurisdiction, the various provinces can create, dissolve, and reorganize local governments freely and they have been described as "creatures of the province".

The Western provinces have more varied types of administrative sub-divisions than the Eastern provinces. The province of British Columbia has "regional districts" which function as county-equivalents. Manitoba and Saskatchewan are divided into rural municipalities.

Alberta is also divided into counties, albeit they are officially classified as "municipal districts" by the province, though in regular everyday parlance these entities are referred to as a "county". Alberta has some unique local governance schemes formed in response to local conditions. For instance, Sherwood Park is an unincorporated "urban service area" of 72,017 within Strathcona County, which has most of the oil refining capacity in Western Canada; Fort McMurray was once a city but dissolved itself and became an "urban service area" of 70,964 people within the Regional Municipality (R.M.) of Wood Buffalo, which has several multibillion-dollar oil sands plants; and Lloydminster, a city of 31,483 which sits directly astride the border between Alberta and Saskatchewan. Unlike most such cases, Lloydminster is not a pair of twin cities on opposite sides of a border, but is actually incorporated by both provinces as a single city with a single municipal administration. The residents objected to the federal government splitting the city in two when it created the two provinces, so the two provinces reunified it by declaring it to be a single city in two provinces, thereby bypassing the limitations of a twin-city arrangement.

=== Pakistan ===
Pakistan is administratively divided into four provinces:

- Punjab
- Sindh
- Khyber Pakhtunkhwa
- Balochistan

It also has two autonomous territories:

- Azad Jammu and Kashmir
- Gilgit Baltistan

=== Russia ===
The term "province" is sometimes used to refer to the historic governorates (guberniyas) of Russia. This terms also refers to the provinces (провинции), which were introduced as the subdivisions of the governorates in 1719 and existed until 1775. In modern parlance, the term is commonly used to refer to the oblasts and krais of Russia.

=== Polities translated ===
Country	Local name(s)	Language	Number of entities
Provinces of Afghanistan	wilayat	Pashto, Dari	34
Provinces of Algeria	wilaya	Arabic	58
Provinces of Angola	província	Portuguese	18
Provinces of Argentina	provincia	Spanish	23
Provinces of Armenia	marz	Armenian	11
Provinces of Belarus	voblast	Belarusian	7
Provinces of Belgium (Flemish Region)	provincie	Dutch	5
Provinces of Belgium (Walloon Region)	province	French	5
Provinces of Bolivia	provincia	Spanish	100
Provinces of Bulgaria	oblast	Bulgarian	28
Provinces of Burkina Faso	province	French	45
Provinces of Burundi	province	French	17
Provinces of Cambodia	khaet (ខេត្ត)	Khmer	24 + 1
Provinces of Canada	province	English, French	10
Provinces of Chile	provincia	Spanish	54
Provinces of China	shěng (省)	Standard Chinese	23 + 35
Provinces of Costa Rica	provincia	Spanish	7
Provinces of Cuba	provincia	Spanish	15
Provinces of the Democratic Republic of the Congo	province	French	25
Provinces of the Dominican Republic	provincia	Spanish	33
Provinces of Ecuador	provincia	Spanish	24
Provinces of Equatorial Guinea	provincia	Spanish	7
Provinces of Fiji	yasana	Fijian	14
Provinces of Finland	läänit or län	Finnish, Swedish	6
Provinces of Gabon	province	French	9
Provinces of Georgia	mkhare (მხარე)	Georgian, Abkhazian	12
Provinces of Greece	επαρχία (eparchia)	Greek	73
Provinces of Indonesia	provinsi	Indonesian	38
Provinces of Iran	ostan	Persian	31
Provinces of Ireland	cúige	Irish	4
Provinces of Italy	provincia	Italian	110
Provinces of Kazakhstan	oblys (облыс)	Kazakh	14
Provinces of Kenya	province	English	8
Provinces of Kyrgyzstan	oblus (облус)	Kyrgyz	7
Provinces of Laos	khoueng (ແຂວງ)	Lao	16
Provinces of Madagascar	faritany	Malagasy	6
Provinces of Mongolia	aimag or aymag (Аймаг)	Mongolian	21
Provinces of Mozambique	província	Portuguese	10
Provinces of Nepal	pradesh or pranta (प्रदेश/प्रान्त)	Nepali	7
Provinces of the Netherlands	provincie	Dutch	12
Provinces of North Korea	do or to (도)	Korean	10
Administrative divisions of Norway	provins	Norwegian	18
Provinces of Oman	wilaya	Arabic	62
Provinces of Pakistan	sûba(صوبہ); plural: sûbé (صوبے)	Urdu	7
Provinces of Panama	provincia	Spanish	9
Provinces of Papua New Guinea	province	English	19
Provinces of Peru	provincia	Spanish	195
Provinces of the Philippines	lalawigan or probinsya, provincia, province	Filipino, Spanish, English	82
Provinces of Poland	województwa	Polish	16
Provinces of Romania	provincii	Romanian	41
Provinces of Rwanda	intara	Kinyarwanda	5
Provinces of Saudi Arabia	mintaqah	Arabic	13
Provinces of Sierra Leone	province	English	4
Provinces of the Solomon Islands			9
Provinces of South Africa	province	English	9
Provinces of South Korea	do or to (도/道)	Korean	10
Provinces of Spain	provincia	Spanish	50
Provinces of Sri Lanka	පළාත/palaatha,மாகாணம்/maahaanam & province	Sinhala, Tamil, English	9
Provinces of Suriname	provincie	Dutch	10
Provinces of Tajikistan	viloyat (вилоят), from Arabic wilaya	Tajik	3
Provinces of Thailand	changwat (จังหวัด)	Thai	76 + 1
Provinces of Tonga			5
Provinces of Turkey	il	Turkish	81
Provinces of Turkmenistan	welayat (plural: welayatlar) from wilaya	Turkmen	5
Provinces of Ukraine	oblast	Ukrainian	24 + 3
Provinces of Uzbekistan	viloyat (plural: viloyatlar)	from Arabic wilaya	12
Provinces of Vanuatu			6
Provinces of Vietnam	tỉnh	Vietnamese	28 + 6
Provinces of Zambia	province	English	9
Provinces of Zimbabwe	province	English	8

== Historic provinces ==
=== Ancient, medieval and feudal ===
- The Roman Empire was divided into provinces (provinciae); this is from which the term originated. Later Eastern Half: see Exarchate, thema
- Caliphate and subsequent sultanates: see Emirate
- Khanate can also mean a province as well as an independent state, as either can be headed by a Khan
- Pharaonic Egypt: see nome (Egypt)
- Frankish (Carolingian) 're-founded' Holy Roman Empire: see gau and county
- In the Habsburg territories, the traditional provinces are partly expressed in the Länder of 19th-century Austria-Hungary.
- Mughal Empire: subah
- The provinces of the Ottoman Empire had various types of governors (generally a pasha), but mostly styled vali, hence the predominant term vilayet, generally subdivided (often in beyliks or sanjaks), sometimes grouped under a governor-general (styled beylerbey).
- Achaemenid Persia (and probably before in Media, again after conquest and further extension by Alexander the Great, and in the larger Hellenistic successor states: see satrapy
- In the Tartar Khanate of Kazan: the five daruğa ('direction')

=== Colonial and early modern ===
- Spanish Empire, at several echelons:
  - viceroyalty above
  - intendencia
- The former Republic of the Seven United Provinces (The Netherlands)
- British colonies:
  - American Southern Colonies
    - Province of Carolina (1629–1712)
    - Province of North Carolina (1712–1776)
    - Province of South Carolina (1712–1776)
    - Province of Maryland (1632–1776)
    - Province of Georgia (1732–1777)
  - American Middle Colonies
    - Province of New Jersey (1664–1776)
    - Province of New York (1664–1783)
    - Province of Pennsylvania (1681–1783)
  - American New England Colonies
    - Province of New Hampshire (1680–1686, 1692–1783)
    - Province of Massachusetts Bay (1692–1776)
    - Province of Maine (various dates)
  - Canada (New France)
    - Province of Quebec (1763–1791)
    - Province of Lower Canada (1791–1841)
    - Province of Upper Canada (1791–1841)
    - United Province of Canada (1841–1867)
  - Provinces of the Philippines
  - Provinces of New Zealand (1841–1876)
  - Provinces of Nigeria
  - Province of South Australia (Australian state since 1901)
- The former provinces of Brazil
- The former provinces of France
- The former provinces of India
- The former Five provinces of Ireland
- The former provinces of Japan
- The former provinces of Portugal
- The provinces of Prussia, a former German kingdom/republic
- The provinces of the Republic of New Granada
- The former provinces of Sweden
- The former United Provinces of Central America
- The former United Provinces of the Río de la Plata

== See also ==
- Governor
- Region
- Provincialism
- Regionalism (politics)
- Pradesh
- -stan
