= Section 16 of the Constitution Act, 1867 =

Provision of the Constitution of Canada

British North America Act, 1867

Section 16 of the Constitution Act, 1867 (French: article 16 de la Loi constitutionnelle de 1867) is a provision of the Constitution of Canada, making Ottawa the seat of government of Canada.

The Constitution Act, 1867 is the constitutional statute which established Canada. Originally named the British North America Act, 1867, the Act continues to be the foundational statute for the Constitution of Canada, although it has been amended many times since 1867. It is now recognised as part of the supreme law of Canada.

== Constitution Act, 1867 ==
The Constitution Act, 1867 is part of the Constitution of Canada and thus part of the supreme law of Canada. The Act sets out the constitutional framework of Canada, including the structure of the federal government and the powers of the federal government and the provinces. It was the product of extensive negotiations between the provinces of British North America at the Charlottetown Conference in 1864, the Quebec Conference in 1864, and the London Conference in 1866. Those conferences were followed by consultations with the British government in 1867. The Act was then enacted in 1867 by the British Parliament under the name the British North America Act, 1867. In 1982 the Act was brought under full Canadian control through the Patriation of the Constitution, and was renamed the Constitution Act, 1867. Since Patriation the Act can only be amended in Canada, under the amending formula set out in the Constitution Act, 1982.

== Text of section 16 ==
Section 16 reads:

Seat of Government of Canada
16 Until the Queen otherwise directs, the Seat of Government of Canada shall be Ottawa.

Section 16 is found in Part III of the Constitution Act, 1867, dealing with the executive power of the federal government.

Section 16 has not been amended since the Act was enacted in 1867.

== Legislative history ==
At the Quebec Conference, one issue which needed to be addressed for the new country was the location of the seat of government. Both the Quebec Resolutions and the London Resolutions provided that the seat of government should be Ottawa, but stated that the designation of the seat of government was "subject to the Royal Prerogative".

During the drafting of the bill, this provision first appeared in the fourth draft, which continued to refer to the royal prerogative. The section took its current wording in the final draft of the bill, which gave the Queen the statutory power to direct a different location, rather than citing the royal prerogative.

== Purpose and interpretation ==
=== Previous dispute about the seat of government ===
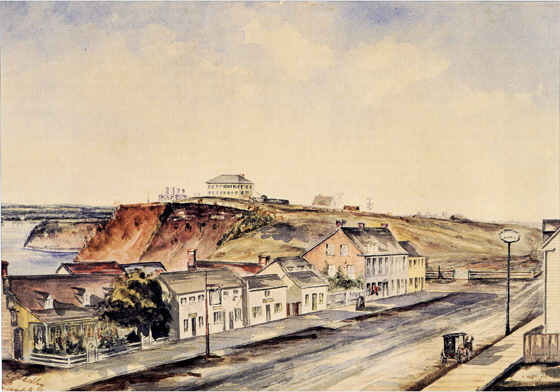
Bytown (now Ottawa) in 1853, showing the future site of the Parliament of Canada on what is now Parliament Hill

The location of the seat of government had been a major political issue in the Province of Canada, resulting in an itinerant parliament over the course of twenty-five years, a referral of the issue to Queen Victoria, and the fall of the Canadian government in 1858.

From 1841 to 1866, the seat of government of the Province of Canada had been in five different cities, and had moved six times. Its original location was Kingston, in Canada West (now Ontario), from 1841 to 1843. It then moved to Montreal, Canada East (now Quebec), from 1843 to 1849; Toronto (Canada West) (1850 to 1851); Quebec City (1852 to 1854); Toronto again (1855 to 1859); Quebec City again (1860 to 1865); and finally Ottawa, Canada West (1866). Each of these relocations had triggered significant political debates, as there were strong regional feelings concerning the location of the seat of government. It is estimated that there were at least 200 votes in Parliament on the issue.

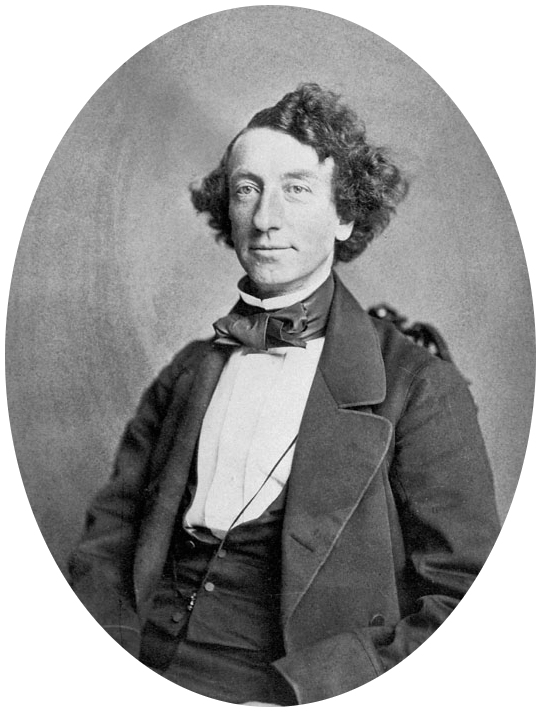
John A. Macdonald, who deferred the decision to Queen Victoria

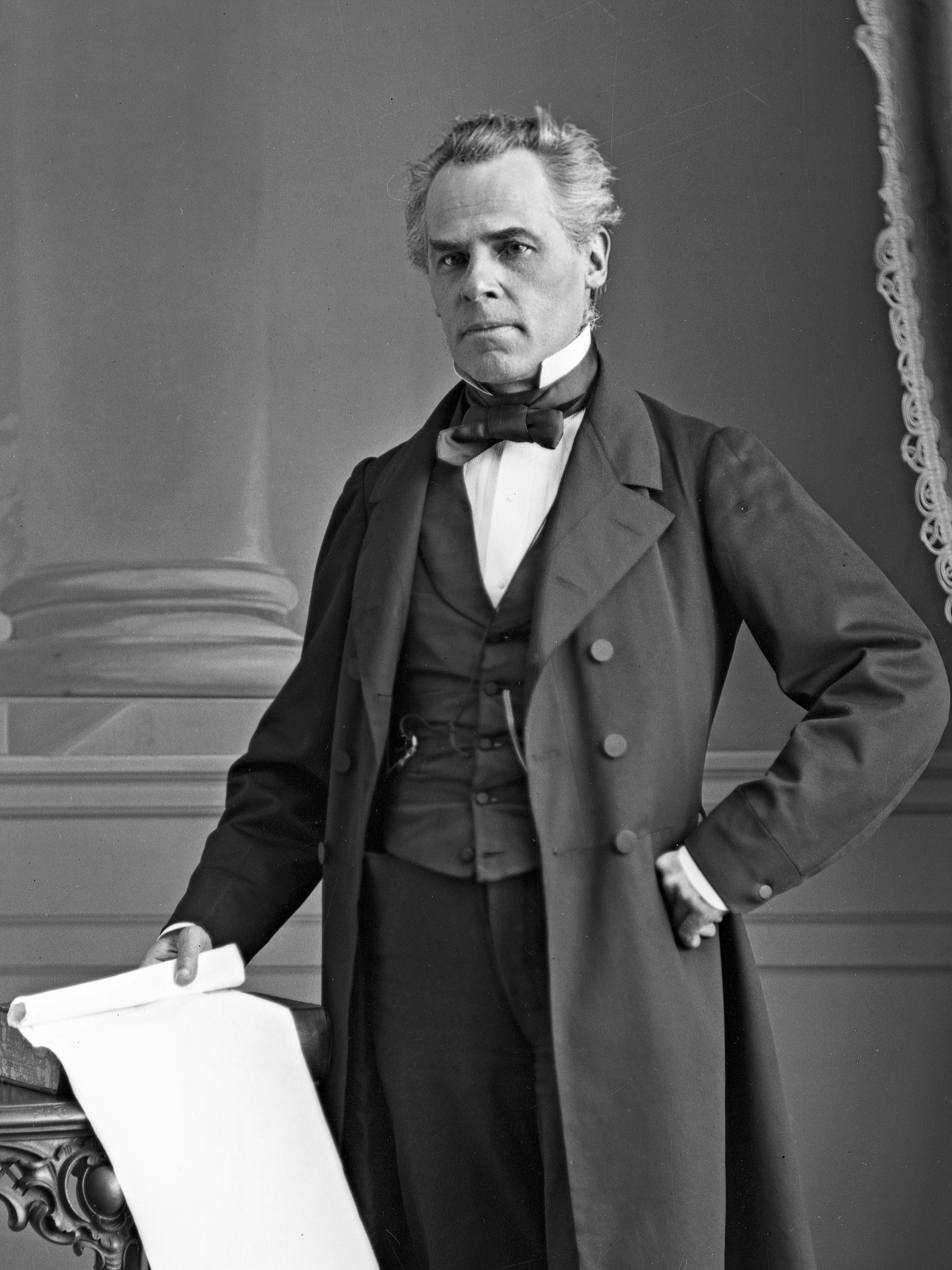
George-Étienne Cartier, who also deferred the decision to the Queen

In 1857, the two co-premiers of the Province of Canada, John A. Macdonald and George-Étienne Cartier, proposed that Queen Victoria should be asked to decide the seat of government. Their own Cabinet was divided on the issue, as Macdonald admitted in the Legislative Assembly, and the regional loyalties were divisive.

The Legislative Assembly adopted that suggestion, but it was controversial. The Globe newspaper in Toronto, published by one of the leading Reform party members, George Brown, condemned the decision, saying that it amounted to a vote "to destroy responsible government by sending to Downing Street for Mr Labouchere [the Colonial Secretary] to fix the seat of government."

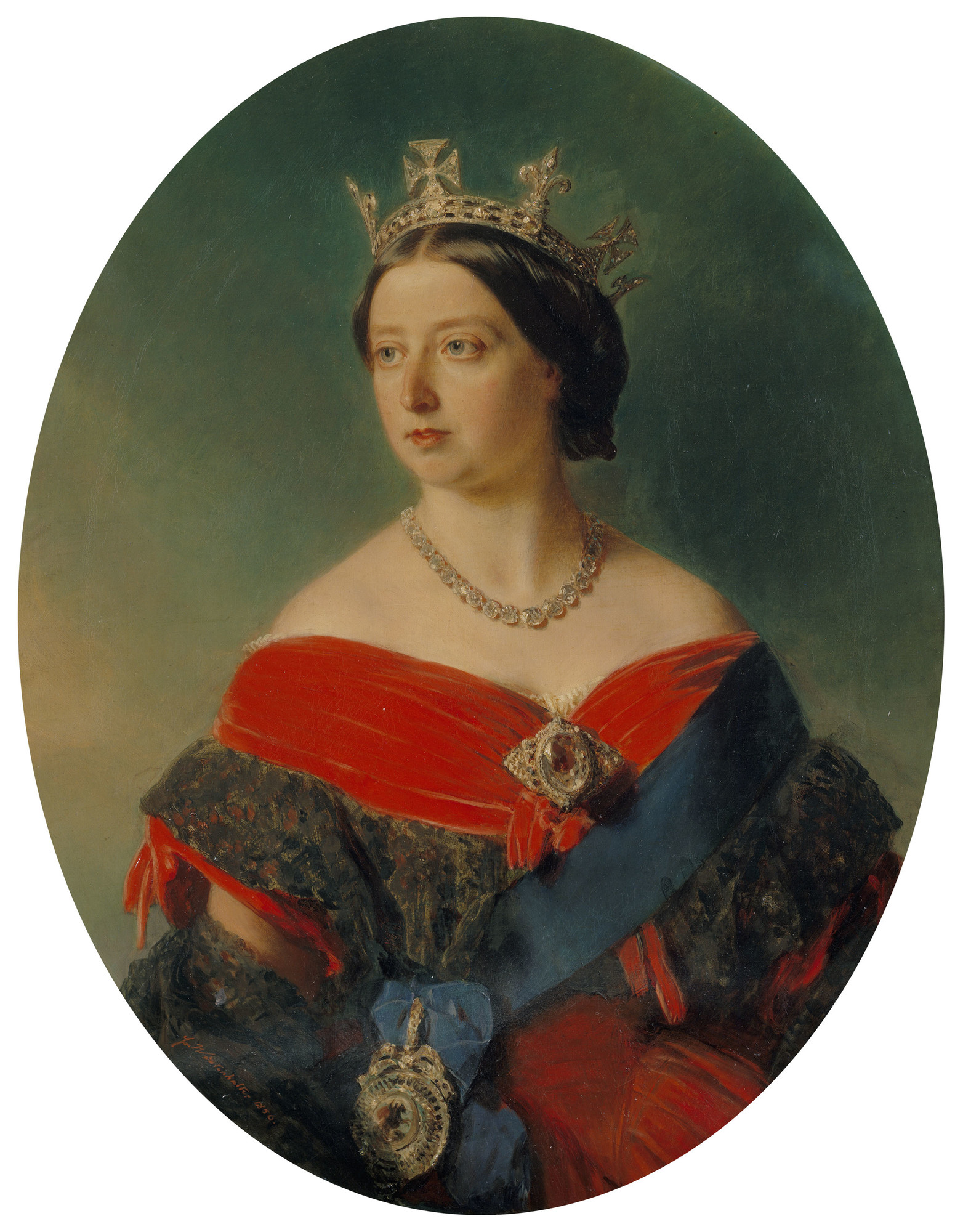
Queen Victoria, who chose Ottawa

The Governor General of Canada, Sir Edmund Head, prepared a confidential memorandum on the issue for the British government. He recommended Ottawa as a reasonable regional compromise, and also for military reasons, given its distance from the American border, unlike Toronto, Kingston and Montreal. The Colonial Secretary, Henry Labouchere, agreed with Head's position and recommended Ottawa to Queen Victoria. The Prince Consort, Prince Albert, also favoured Ottawa. Late in 1857, the Queen made her decision, in favour of Ottawa.

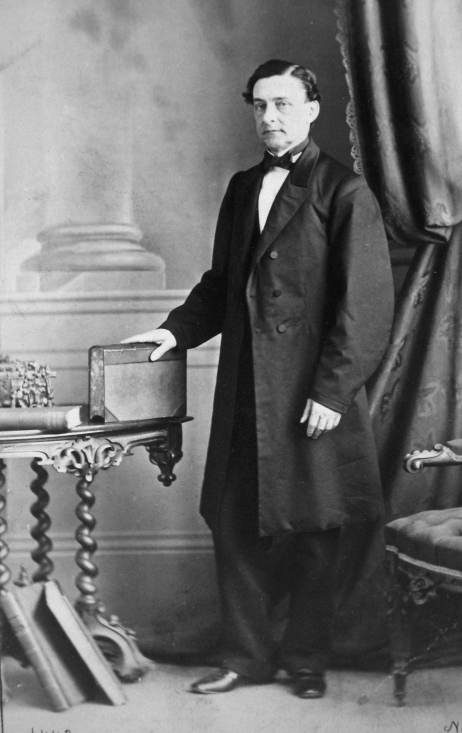
A. A. Dorion, who opposed the Queen's choice of Ottawa

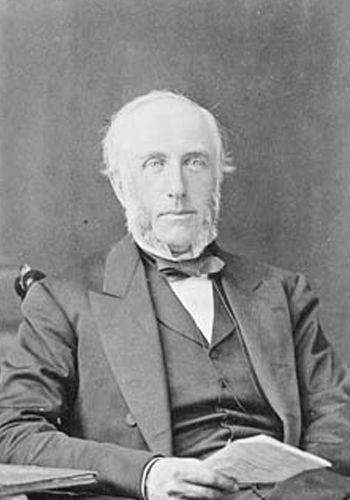
George Brown, who briefly formed a government with Dorion after the government fell over the seat of government issue

The Queen's choice did not end the dispute, and gave rise to a complicated political episode, the Double Shuffle. In the parliamentary session in 1858, the Macdonald–Cartier government introduced a motion to authorise funding to build parliament buildings at Ottawa. The opposition, led by Antoine-Aimé Dorion and George Brown, opposed the proposal, and the government was defeated in the Assembly on the issue. The Macdonald–Cartier government treated the defeat as a matter of confidence and resigned. Brown and Dorion formed a government, but within a few days, they too were defeated and also had to resign. In the interval, Macdonald and Cartier were able to find additional support in the Assembly and were reappointed by Governor General Head.

The next year, 1859, the Cartier–Macdonald government returned to the issue. This time, after a bitter debate lasting two weeks, they were able to carry the motion for the construction of the new parliament buildings in Ottawa, in an exchange for a commitment that the Parliament would sit at Quebec City until the new buildings were ready in Ottawa.

Even that was not the end of the debate. There was one final attempt in the parliamentary session of 1860 to re-open the question, but this time it was defeated by a strong majority in the Assembly.

=== Construction of Parliament buildings ===
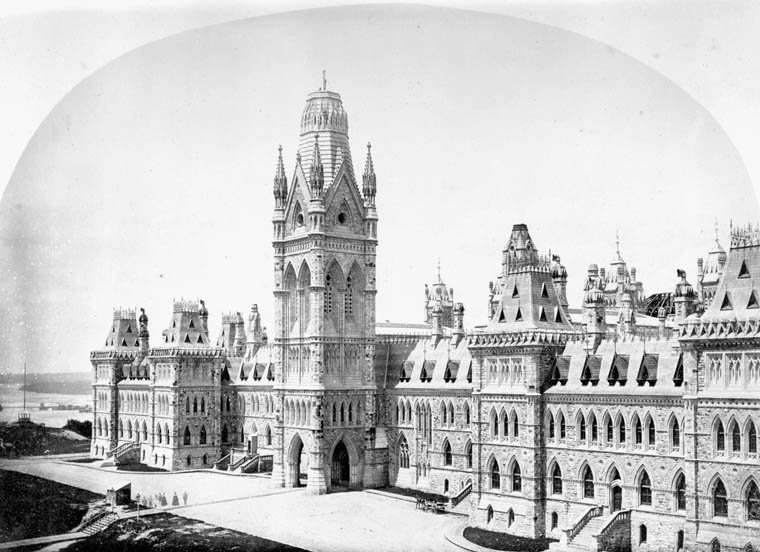
Original Centre Block, destroyed in a fire in 1916

Construction of the new Parliament buildings began in 1860. Progress was initially fast, but the construction was temporarily halted in 1862 because of large cost overruns. A public inquiry was held, which found various faults with the construction process, but recommended that the original architects and builders be allowed to continue the project. By the time the buildings were completed in 1865, the total cost was $2,591,760, a considerable cost overrun from the original budget of £225,000 (equivalent to $1,094,985 at the statutory conversion rate then in use).

The last session of the Parliament of the Province of Canada was held in Ottawa in 1866.

=== Fathers of Confederation choose Ottawa ===
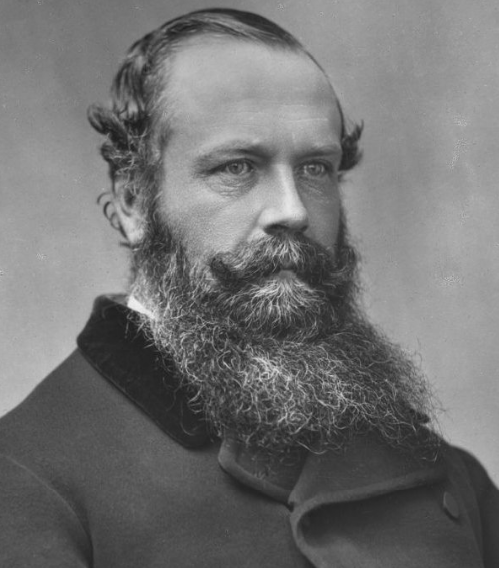
Governor General Lord Monck, who thought the choice of Ottawa was "an act of insanity"

With that history of political conflict, and the cost of the new Parliament buildings, it was not surprising that the delegates to the Quebec Conference agreed on Ottawa as the seat of government. On October 26, 1864, Macdonald proposed to the Conference that Ottawa be the seat of government, "subject to the royal prerogative". The motion passed unanimously.

There are some indications that behind the scenes, the issue was not yet firmly settled. On his return from the London Conference, Macdonald stated publicly that "he had some doubts before going to England as to whether the seat of government for the Dominion would remain in Ottawa, but he was now happy to say there was no question Ottawa was confirmed as the capital of the new Dominion."

The Governor General, Lord Monck, was privately grumbling over the choice of Ottawa. In a confidential letter to the Colonial Secretary, he stated that the choice of Ottawa "...seems like an act of insanity." He predicted that within four years the seat of government would move, likely to Quebec City.

Although the monarch retains the power to move the seat of government under section 16, there has not been any such proposal since the enactment of the Constitution Act, 1867.

=== Provincial jurisdiction over Ottawa ===
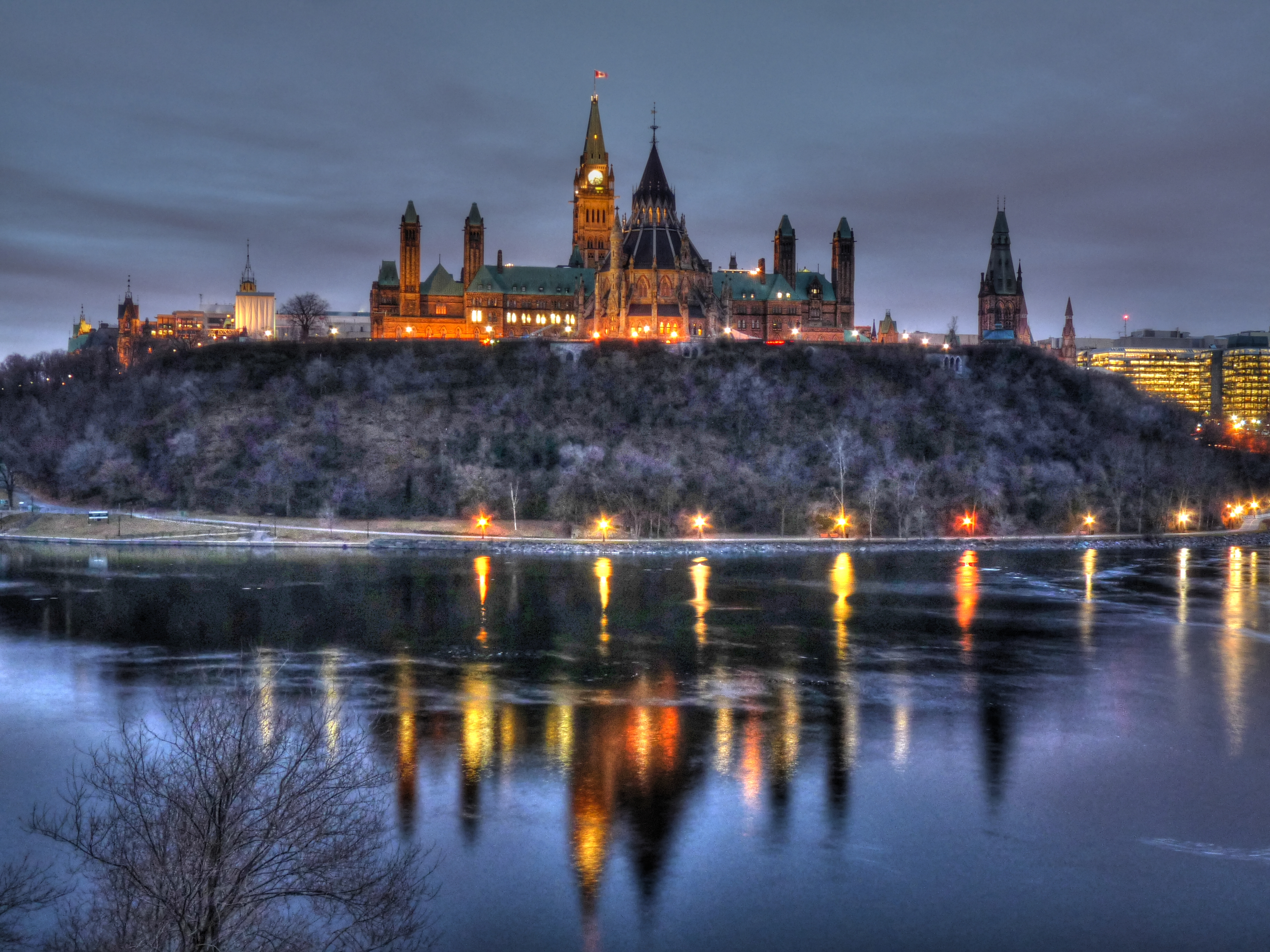
The Parliament Buildings at dawn

Unlike other federations, Canada does not have a specially designated capital area under the exclusive jurisdiction of the federal government. Municipalities are under provincial jurisdiction, through section 92(8) of the Constitution Act, 1867. The city of Ottawa is in the province of Ontario and is incorporated under Ontario law. The federal government has a considerable presence in the office towers of the city of Gatineau, located across the Ottawa River in Quebec, but Gatineau is incorporated under Quebec law.

There is no equivalent to the District of Columbia in the United States, nor the Australian Capital Territory in Australia. One Father of Confederation, John Hamilton Gray of New Brunswick, while praising the choice of Ottawa, stated that the lack of a federal district under the control of Parliament was a mistake.

The federal Parliament has passed a statute to create the National Capital Commission, but that federal legislation does not oust Ontario jurisdiction over Ottawa, nor Quebec jurisdiction over Gatineau. The Supreme Court of Canada has held that the federal Parliament has some legislative jurisdiction over the area around the seat of government, but the extent of that power is not clear.

The mixture of federal, provincial and municipal jurisdiction over Ottawa and Gatineau became an issue during the Canada convoy protest in 2022. The Public Order Emergency Commission appointed to review the use of the Emergencies Act by the federal government commented on the overlapping jurisdiction, and stated that it may have contributed to the slow response to the protests.

== Related provisions of the Constitution Act, 1867 ==
Section 68 of the Act defines the seats of government of the four original provinces of Canada: Toronto for Ontario; Quebec City for Quebec; Fredericton for New Brunswick; and Halifax for Nova Scotia.

Section 92(8) of the Act provides that the provinces have exclusive jurisdiction over municipalities.
