= Section 68 of the Constitution Act, 1867 =

Provision of the Constitution of Canada

British North America Act, 1867

Section 68 of the Constitution Act, 1867 (French: article 68 de la Loi constitutionnelle de 1867) is a provision of the Constitution of Canada relating to the seats of government of the four original provinces, New Brunswick, Nova Scotia, Ontario and Quebec.

The Constitution Act, 1867 is the constitutional statute which established Canada. Originally named the British North America Act, 1867, the Act continues to be the foundational statute for the Constitution of Canada, although it has been amended many times since 1867. It is now recognised as part of the supreme law of Canada.

== Constitution Act, 1867 ==
The Constitution Act, 1867 is part of the Constitution of Canada and thus part of the supreme law of Canada. The Act sets out the constitutional framework of Canada, including the structure of the federal government and the powers of the federal government and the provinces. It was the product of extensive negotiations between the provinces of British North America at the Charlottetown Conference in 1864, the Quebec Conference in 1864, and the London Conference in 1866. Those conferences were followed by consultations with the British government in 1867. The Act was then enacted by the British Parliament under the name the British North America Act, 1867. In 1982 the Act was brought under full Canadian control through the Patriation of the Constitution, and was renamed the Constitution Act, 1867. Since Patriation, the Act can only be amended in Canada, under the amending formula set out in the Constitution Act, 1982.

== Text of section 68 ==
Section 68 reads:

Seats of Provincial Governments
68 Unless and until the Executive Government of any Province otherwise directs with respect to that Province, the Seats of Governments of the Provinces shall be as follows, namely,—of Ontario, the City of Toronto; of Quebec, the City of Quebec; of Nova Scotia, the City of Halifax; and of New Brunswick, the City of Fredericton.

Section 68 is found in Part V of the Constitution Act, 1867, dealing with provincial constitutions. It has not been amended since the Act was enacted in 1867.

== Purpose and interpretation ==
Section 68 defines the seats of government of the four original provinces. The established seats of government of New Brunswick and Nova Scotia were continued, but seats of government had to be assigned for the two new provinces created by the Act, Ontario and Quebec. All four were chosen as seats of government in part for military reasons, with two based on the risk of conflict with the United States.

=== Quebec City ===
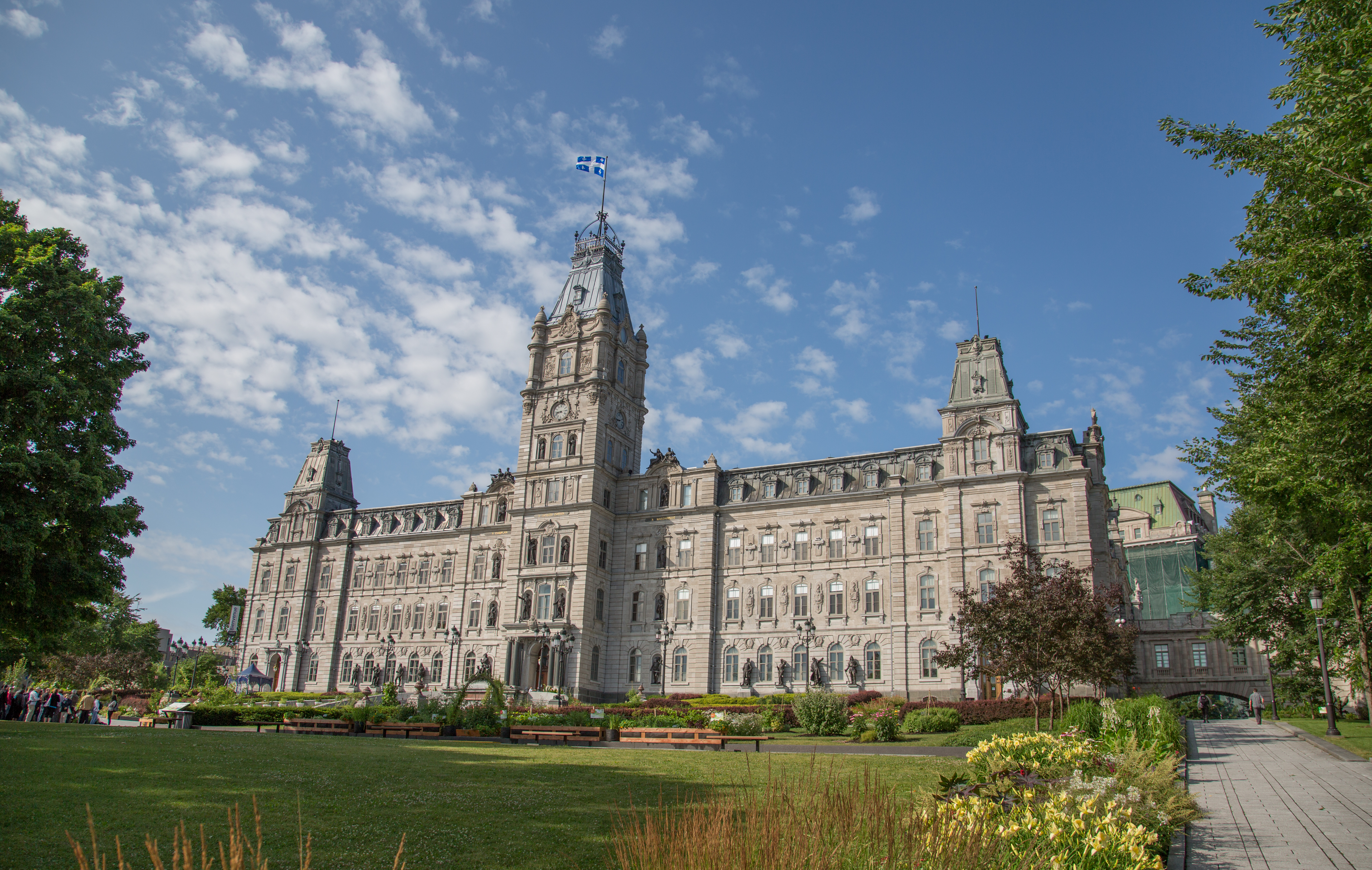
National Assembly of Quebec, Quebec City

Quebec City was the oldest city of the four, but had an interrupted tenure as a provincial capital. Its military significance was its location at the point where the St. Lawrence estuary narrows into the St. Lawrence River, which was the cut-off point for large ocean-going warships entering the St. Lawrence. Quebec was the oldest city in New France, and had served as the capital of the French colony of Canada. It had also served as the capital of the British Province of Quebec (from 1763 to 1791), and then as the capital of Lower Canada from 1791 to 1841. Quebec served as the seat of government of the Province of Canada from 1852 to 1856, and again from 1859 to 1866. Quebec became the seat of government of the new province of Quebec on July 1, 1867.

=== Halifax ===
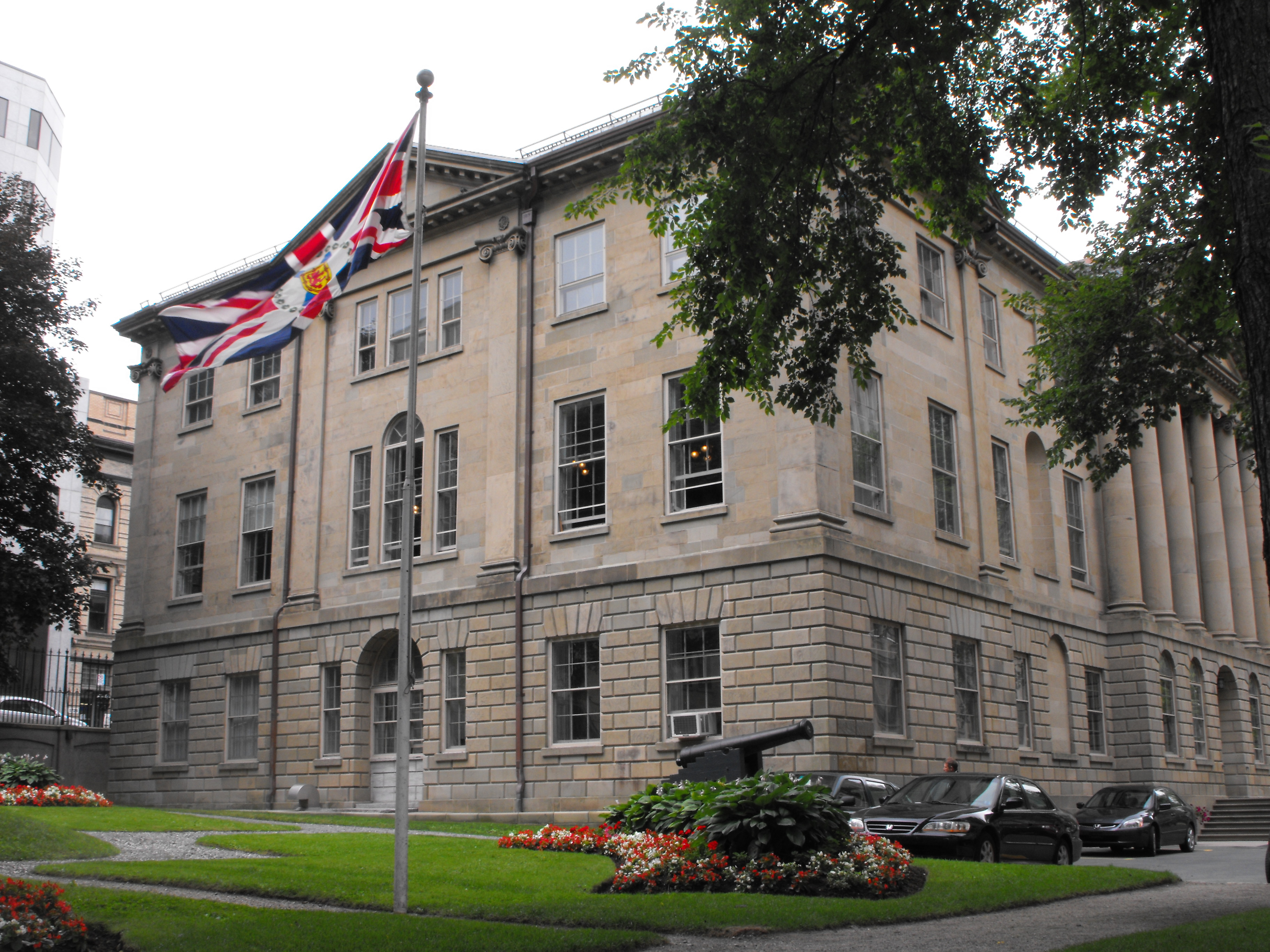
Nova Scotia Province House, Halifax

Halifax was the second oldest provincial capital, having served as the capital of the British colony of Nova Scotia since 1749. Its deep harbour, ice-free year round, made it a valuable port for the Royal Navy. Halifax was one of the main stations for the Royal Navy in British North America in the 18th and 19th centuries. Halifax continued as the seat of government of the province of Nova Scotia after Confederation in 1867.

=== Fredericton ===
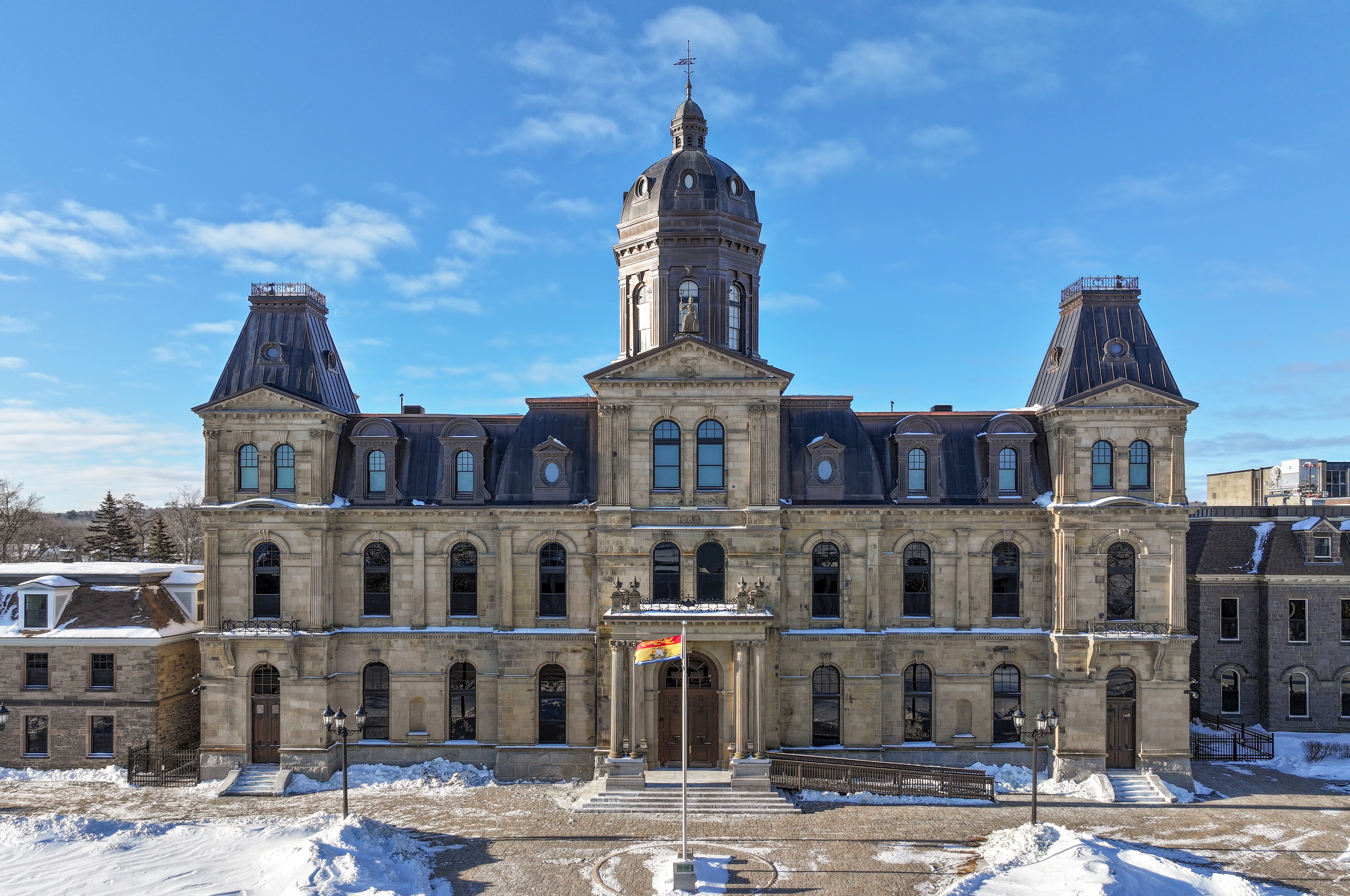
New Brunswick Legislative Building, Fredericton

Fredericton was made the capital of the British colony of New Brunswick in 1783. The site was chosen because it was well-inland, and thus not vulnerable to naval attack from the United States. It continued as the seat of government of the province of New Brunswick after Confederation.

=== Toronto ===
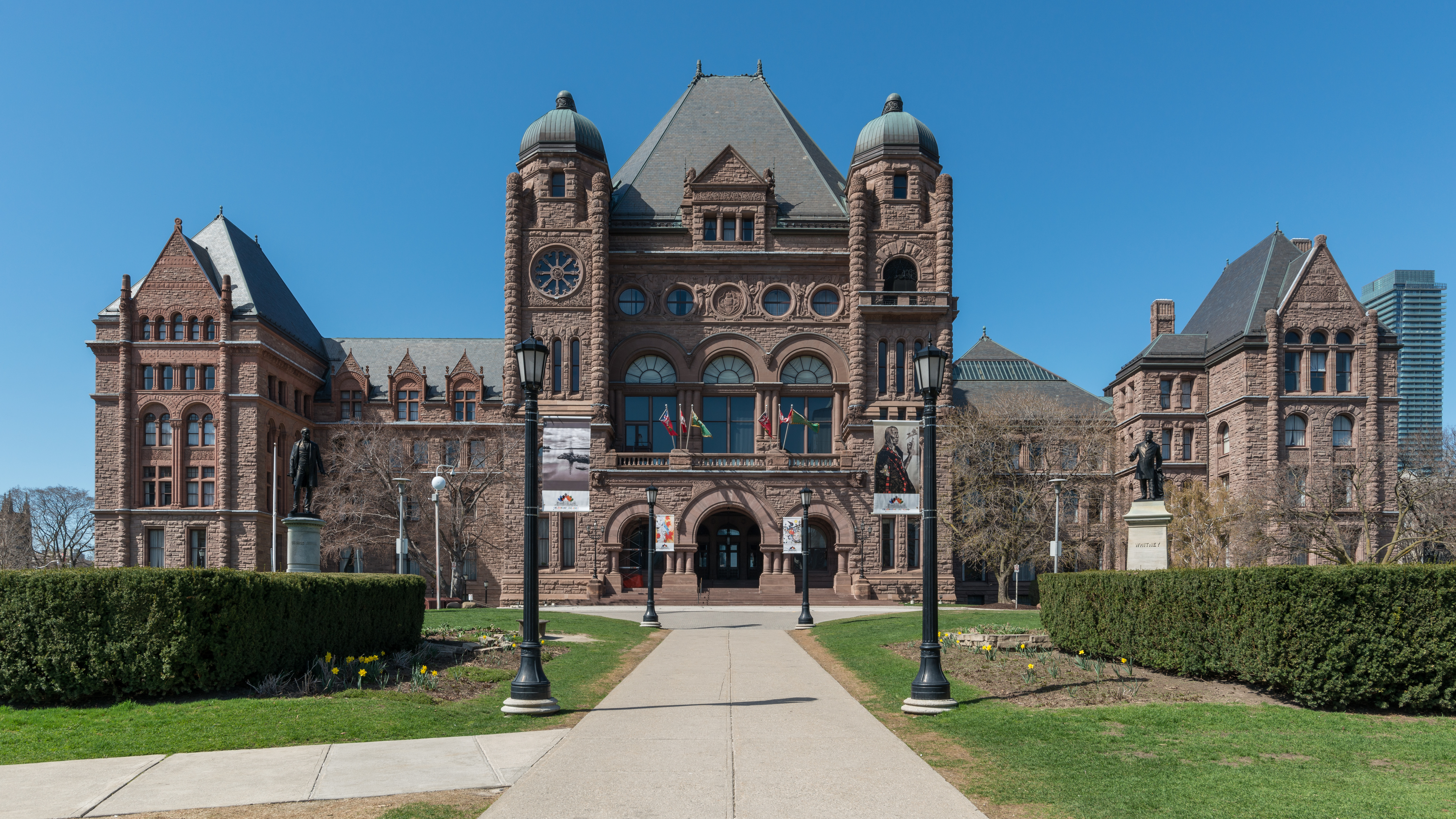
Ontario Legislative Building, Toronto

Toronto, originally named York, had been the second capital of Upper Canada. Newark (now Niagara-on-the-Lake) was the first capital of Upper Canada, but the capital was moved to York because Newark was too close to the United States, being just across the Niagara River from Fort Niagara, New York.

Even so, York was attacked and occupied by invading American forces during the War of 1812, in the Battle of York, April 1813. Before the American invaders left, they burnt down several government buildings, including the provincial Parliament building and Government House, and looted private property. In spite of that attack, York continued to be the capital of Upper Canada until the Province of Canada was created, when Kingston became the capital of the new province. York was renamed Toronto in 1834. It served as the capital of the Province of Canada from 1849 to 1852, and again from 1856 to 1858. It became the seat of government of the new province of Ontario on July 1, 1867.

== Related provisions of the Constitution Act, 1867 ==
Section 16 provides that Ottawa is the seat of government for Canada.
