= Section 95 of the Constitution Act, 1867 =

Provision of the Constitution of Canada

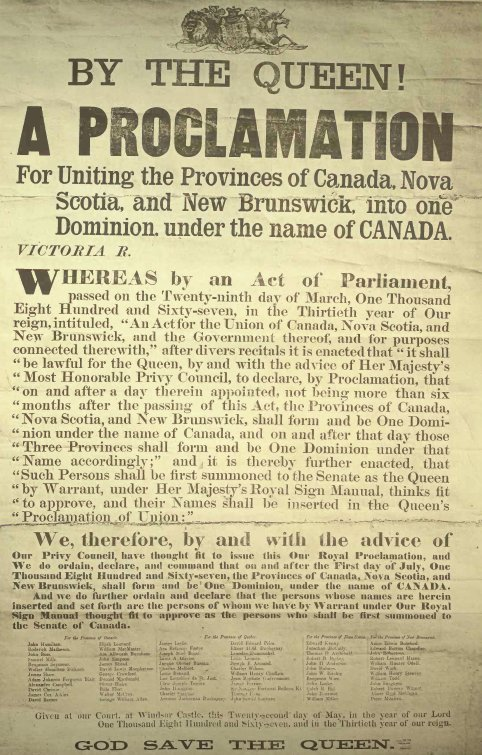
Proclamation bringing the Constitution Act into force, July 1, 1867

Section 95 of the Constitution Act, 1867 (French: article 95 de la Loi constitutionnelle de 1867) is a provision of the Constitution of Canada relating to federal and provincial legislative jurisdiction over agriculture and immigration.

The Constitution Act, 1867 is the constitutional statute which established Canada. Originally named the British North America Act, 1867, the Act continues to be the foundational statute for the Constitution of Canada, although it has been amended many times since 1867. It is now recognised as part of the supreme law of Canada.

== Constitution Act, 1867 ==
The Constitution Act, 1867 is part of the Constitution of Canada and thus part of the supreme law of Canada. It was the product of extensive negotiations by the governments of the British North American provinces in the 1860s. The Act sets out the constitutional framework of Canada, including the structure of the federal government and the powers of the federal government and the provinces. Originally enacted in 1867 by the British Parliament under the name the British North America Act, 1867, in 1982 the Act was brought under full Canadian control through the Patriation of the Constitution, and was renamed the Constitution Act, 1867. Since Patriation the Act can only be amended in Canada, under the amending formula set out in the Constitution Act, 1982.

== Text of section 95 ==
Section 95 reads:

Concurrent Powers of Legislation respecting Agriculture, &c.
95. In each Province the Legislature may make Laws in relation to Agriculture in the Province, and to Immigration into the Province; and it is hereby declared that the Parliament of Canada may from Time to Time make Laws in relation to Agriculture in all or any of the Provinces, and to Immigration into all or any of the Provinces; and any Law of the Legislature of a Province relative to Agriculture or to Immigration shall have effect in and for the Province as long and as far only as it is not repugnant to any Act of the Parliament of Canada.

Section 95 is found in Part VI of the Constitution Act, 1867, dealing with distribution of legislative powers. It has not been amended since the Act was enacted in 1867.

== Purpose and interpretation ==
In 1867, Canada's economy was largely agricultural in nature, and new settlers generally came to Canada to farm. Agriculture and immigration were therefore linked together as similar subject matters. Because both subject matters could have wide-ranging effect, they were assigned to both levels of government on a concurrent basis, rather than the exclusivity principle which applies to the lists of federal powers set out in section 91 of the Constitution Act, 1867, and the provincial powers set out in section 92. Section 95 provides that in case of conflict between a federal and provincial law dealing with agriculture or immigration, the federal law prevails, an example of the doctrine of federal paramountcy.

The courts have interpreted the agriculture power as applying primarily to the activity of farming. Once agricultural products have left the farm and entered the stream of commerce, they are not subject to regulation under the agriculture power.

There has not been a great deal of litigation involving the scope of the federal and provincial immigration powers. The few cases that have been decided gave a broad scope to the federal paramountcy. As well, there were nineteen cases where the federal government disallowed provincial laws relating to immigration.

== Related provisions ==
Section 91(25) of the Constitution Act, 1867 gives the federal Parliament exclusive jurisdiction over "Naturalization and Aliens".
