= Section 93A of the Constitution Act, 1867 =

Provision of the Constitution of Canada

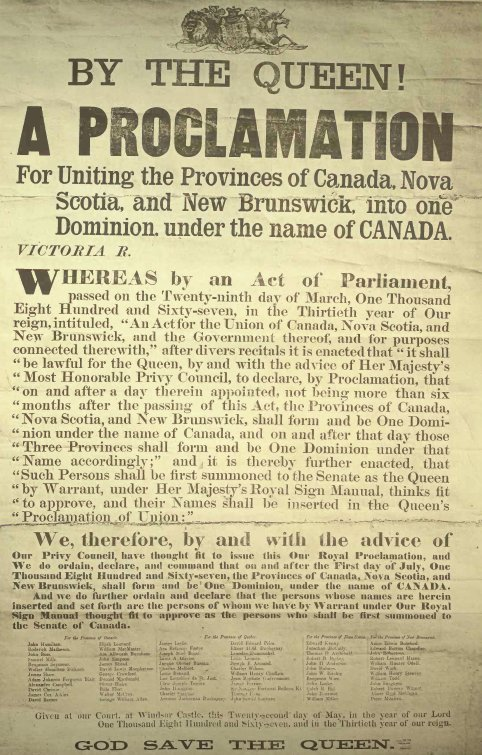
Proclamation bringing the Constitution Act into force, July 1, 1867

Section 93A of the Constitution Act, 1867 (French: article 93A de la Loi constitutionnelle de 1867) is a provision of the Constitution of Canada, extinguishing the right to publicly funded denominational and separate schools in the province of Quebec. It was enacted as a bilateral constitutional amendment in 1997.

The Constitution Act, 1867 is the constitutional statute which established Canada. Originally named the British North America Act, 1867, the Act continues to be the foundational statute for the Constitution of Canada, although it has been amended many times since 1867. It is now recognised as part of the supreme law of Canada.

== Constitution Act, 1867 ==
The Constitution Act, 1867 is part of the Constitution of Canada and thus part of the supreme law of Canada. It was the product of extensive negotiations by the governments of the British North American provinces in the 1860s. The Act sets out the constitutional framework of Canada, including the structure of the federal government and the powers of the federal government and the provinces. Originally enacted in 1867 by the British Parliament under the name the British North America Act, 1867, in 1982 the Act was brought under full Canadian control by the Patriation of the Constitution, and was renamed the Constitution Act, 1867. Since Patriation the Act can only be amended in Canada, under the amending formula set out in the Constitution Act, 1982.

== Text of section 93A ==
Section 93A reads:

Quebec
93A. Paragraphs (1) to (4) of section 93 do not apply to Quebec.

Section 93A is found in Part VI of the Constitution Act, 1867, dealing with the distribution of legislative powers.

== Constitutional amendment ==
Section 93A was not part of the Constitution Act, 1867 when first enacted. It was added in 1997 through a bilateral constitutional amendment by the National Assembly of Quebec and the two houses of the federal Parliament, the Senate and the House of Commons. The authority for a bilateral amendment comes from section 43 of the Constitution Act, 1982, which provides for amendments to constitutional provisions that apply to "one or more, but not all, provinces".

== Purpose and interpretation ==
When the Constitution Act, 1867 was enacted, one of the major issues was the question of denominational and separate religious schools in the provinces of Ontario and Quebec. Section 93 provided constitutional protection for the pre-Confederation school laws in those two provinces, which had been the result of much political conflict in the 1850s and 1860s. The francophone population of Quebec at that time were strong supporters of the Catholic church, and the model for education was that it would be provided along religious lines. The provision for denominational and separate schools responded to that concern, while also ensuring that Protestants in Quebec, almost entirely anglophone, would have their own schools.

By the late 20th century, the social setting in Quebec had changed. Following the Quiet Revolution, the influence of the Catholic church greatly declined in Quebec, and the focus in public education was on the division between schools using French and schools using English, as set out in section 23 of the Canadian Charter of Rights and Freedoms.

The government of Quebec therefore proposed that the Constitution Act, 1867 be amended to extinguish the provisions for denominational and separate schools in Quebec. In 1997, the National Assembly passed a resolution to enact section 93A, which was then passed by the House of Commons and Senate. Section 93A abolished publicly funded denominational and separate schools in Quebec, leaving instead a system of language-based schools.

== Related provisions ==
Section 93 of the Constitution Act, 1867 originally provided for denominational and separate schools in Quebec.

Section 23 of the Canadian Charter of Rights and Freedoms provides for publicly funded minority language schools.

Section 43 of the Constitution Act, 1982 provides for amendments to constitutional provisions which apply to "one or more, but not all, provinces", by resolutions passed by the provincial legislative assembly and the Senate and House of Commons of the federal Parliament.
