= Section 93 of the Constitution Act, 1867 =

Provision of the Constitution of Canada

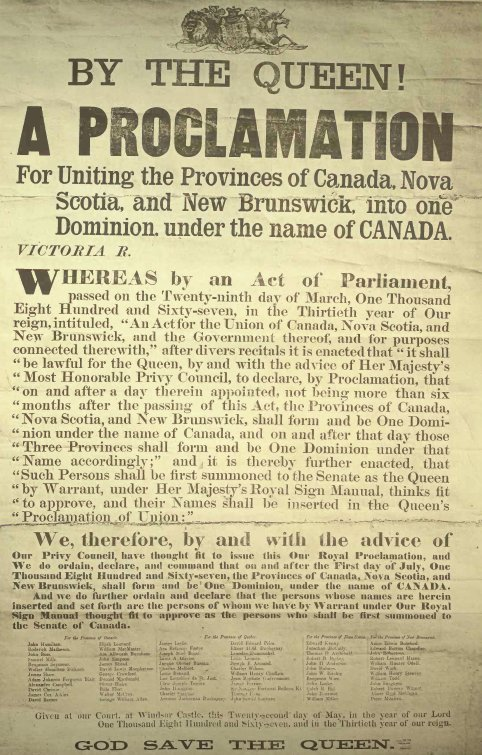
Proclamation bringing the Constitution Act into force, July 1, 1867

Section 93 of the Constitution Act, 1867 (French: article 93 de la Loi constitutionnelle de 1867) is a provision of the Constitution of Canada relating to education. It gives the provinces a broad legislative jurisdiction over education. Section 93 also contains guarantees of publicly funded denominational and separate schools for Catholic or Protestant minorities in some provinces.

The Constitution Act, 1867 is the constitutional statute which established Canada. Originally named the British North America Act, 1867, the Act continues to be the foundational statute for the Constitution of Canada, although it has been amended many times since 1867. It is now recognised as part of the supreme law of Canada.

== Constitution Act, 1867 ==
The Constitution Act, 1867 is part of the Constitution of Canada and thus part of the supreme law of Canada. It was the product of extensive negotiations by the governments of the British North American provinces in the 1860s. The Act sets out the constitutional framework of Canada, including the structure of the federal government and the powers of the federal government and the provinces. Originally enacted in 1867 by the British Parliament under the name the British North America Act, 1867, in 1982 the Act was brought under full Canadian control through the Patriation of the Constitution, and was renamed the Constitution Act, 1867. Since Patriation the Act can only be amended in Canada, under the amending formula set out in the Constitution Act, 1982.

== Text of section 93 ==
Section 93 reads:

Legislation respecting education
93 In and for each Province the Legislature may exclusively make Laws in relation to Education, subject and according to the following Provisions:—

(1.) Nothing in any such Law shall prejudicially affect any Right or Privilege with respect to Denominational Schools which any Class of Persons have by Law in the Province at the Union:
(2.) All the Powers, Privileges, and Duties at the Union by Law conferred and imposed in Upper Canada on the Separate Schools and School Trustees of the Queen's Roman Catholic Subjects shall be and the same are hereby extended to the Dissentient Schools of the Queen's Protestant and Roman Catholic Subjects in Quebec:
(3.) Where in any Province a System of Separate or Dissentient Schools exists by Law at the Union or is thereafter established by the Legislature of the Province, an Appeal shall lie to the Governor General in Council from any Act or Decision of any Provincial Authority affecting any Right or Privilege of the Protestant or Roman Catholic Minority of the Queen's Subjects in relation to Education:
(4.) In case any such Provincial Law as from Time to Time seems to the Governor General in Council requisite for the due Execution of the Provisions of this Section is not made, or in case any Decision of the Governor General in Council on any Appeal under this Section is not duly executed by the proper Provincial Authority in that Behalf, then and in every such Case, and as far only as the Circumstances of each Case require, the Parliament of Canada may make remedial Laws for the due Execution of the Provisions of this Section and of any Decision of the Governor General in Council under this Section.

Section 93 is found in Part VI of the Constitution Act, 1867, dealing with the distribution of legislative powers.

== Amendments ==
The text of section 93 has not been amended since the Act was enacted in 1867, but it has had different scope in the provinces of Manitoba, Alberta, Saskatchewan, and Newfoundland and Labrador. Alberta and Saskatchewan have different versions of paragraph 93(1). Manitoba and Newfoundland have entirely separate provisions, although modelled on section 93.

Constitutional amendments have eliminated the provisions for separate and denominational schools in Quebec and in Newfoundland and Labrador.

== Purpose and interpretation ==
=== At Confederation ===
When the Constitution Act, 1867 was enacted, education was one of the major issues which the Fathers of Confederation had to deal with. At that time, it was generally accepted that teaching Christian religion was a necessary component of education in the publicly funded school systems, and also that there could be considerable local variation in the form and organisation of public schools. Section 93 therefore assigned exclusive jurisdiction over education to the provinces, with certain guarantees for separate and denominational schools. There was also a very limited scope for federal intervention in certain cases.

The issue of education was particularly important in the Province of Canada, which would be split after Confederation into the provinces of Ontario and Quebec. The population of what was to be Quebec was primarily French-speaking and Catholic, but with a significant minority of English-speakers who were mainly Protestant. The situation was complicated by the fact that in some areas of Quebec, the English-speaking Protestants were the local majority and the French-speaking Catholics were the local minority. In what was to be Ontario, the population was primarily English-speaking and Protestant, but with a significant minority of Catholics, some of whom were French-speaking.

Prior to Confederation, the religious component of schools had been a major issue in the Province of Canada. The system that had evolved was that the public schools in each province would be under the control of the religious majority, either Protestant or Catholic, but that the religious minority in each province would have a right to their own denominational or separate schools. The Fathers of Confederation agreed to entrench that system in the Constitution to provide guarantees to the religious minority in each of the new provinces of Ontario and Quebec.

Paragraphs (1) to (4) of section 93 were the mechanism chosen to protect those religious rights. Paragraph (1) protected existing school rights for the religious minority in each province, while paragraph (2) provided that the pre-Confederation rights of the Catholic minority in Ontario would apply equally to the Catholic and Protestant minorities in Quebec. Paragraph (3) provided that if a system of separate schools was established in a province after Confederation, and then subsequently reduced, an appeal lay to the federal government. Paragraph (4) provided that in that limited case, the federal Parliament had a power to legislate to restore the rights which had been taken away.

=== Other provinces ===
==== New Brunswick and Nova Scotia ====
Neither New Brunswick nor Nova Scotia had separate or denominational schools as a matter of law at Confederation, and neither province subsequently established them. A dispute in New Brunswick over the creation of a new public school system resulted in the first major court case under section 93, Maher v Town Council of Portland, which confirmed that there had not been any denominational or separate schools established by law at Confederation in New Brunswick.

==== Manitoba ====
When Manitoba entered Confederation in 1870, section 22 of the Manitoba Act, 1870 gave the province jurisdiction over education. Section 22 used slightly different wording from section 93, reflecting the fact that there were no public schools in the region at the time, but maintained the option of an appeal to the federal government.

The province established publicly funded denominational schools shortly after 1870, but abolished them in 1890. The abolition triggered two significant court cases which went on appeal to the Judicial Committee of the Privy Council in Britain, and caused a major political crisis for the federal government. For the first and only time, the federal government introduced remedial legislation under paragraph 93(4), but Prime Minister Tupper did not succeed in passing it before being defeated in the federal election of 1896, largely on the Manitoba Schools Question.

==== British Columbia and Prince Edward Island ====
Neither British Columbia nor Prince Edward Island had denominational or separate schools when they entered Confederation in 1871 and 1873.

==== Alberta and Saskatchewan ====
From 1870 to 1905, the area between Manitoba and British Columbia was the North-West Territories, created by federal legislation. The federal laws relating to the North-West Territories required that the territorial government institute a system for publicly funded schools with a religious component. In 1901, the Legislature of the North-West Territories enacted two ordinances, the School Ordinance and the Ordinance respecting Assessment and Taxation in School Districts. The ordinances instituted a system of public schools, with the option for the local religious minority in a district, either Protestant or Catholic, to establish separate schools.

When the federal government of Sir Wilfrid Laurier was considering establishing the two provinces of Alberta and Saskatchewan from the North-West Territories in 1905, the schools question became a major point of contention in Parliament. The initial versions of the two bills put forward by the Laurier government were ambiguous on exactly what type of school system the government proposing. Some members of Parliament interpreted the bills as establishing denominational schools generally, not simply the option for local separate schools. One of the leading western members of Laurier's government, Clifford Sifton, resigned from Cabinet over the issue. A compromise was eventually reached where the Alberta Act and the Saskatchewan Act each contained a specific version of paragraph (1) of section 93, protecting the rights to separate schools as set out in the schools ordinances of 1901.

==== Newfoundland and Labrador ====
Newfoundland and Labrador joined Confederation in 1949. As with Manitoba, section 93 did not apply directly to Newfoundland and Labrador. The province's powers over education were set out in Term 17 of the Newfoundland Terms of Union. Term 17 followed the framework of section 93, but instead continued a system where six different denominations could each run their own schools: Catholic, Anglican, United, Moravian, Presbyterian, and Salvation Army.

== Relationship with Charter rights ==
=== Freedom of association and religious equality ===
The Canadian Charter of Rights and Freedoms is also part of the Constitution of Canada, and it contains guarantees for religious freedom and equality. Soon after the Charter was enacted in 1982, issues arose about the inter-relationship between the guarantee for publicly funded religious-based schools, and those Charter guarantees.

The issue came before the Supreme Court of Canada in a case arising in Ontario: Reference re Bill 30, An Act to Amend the Education Act (Ont.). The provincial government had decided to extend funding for Catholic separate high schools to match the funding that public high schools received. The decision was controversial, and the provincial government referred the issue to the courts as a reference question. When the matter reached the Supreme Court, the Court unanimously held that the extension of funding did not infringe the Charter. One part of the Constitution cannot override another part, and since section 93 expressly provided for the funding of separate schools, the Charter cannot be used to overturn that constitutional right, possessed by members of the Catholic minority. The Court also relied on section 29 of the Charter, which provided that the enactment of the Charter did not affect rights to denominational or separate schools set out in the Constitution.

In a subsequent case, Adler v Ontario, the Supreme Court held that the Charter cannot be used to expand the school funding guarantee to religious groups not included in section 93.

=== Minority language schools ===
Section 23 of the Charter provides a guarantee of publicly funded minority language schools: English in Quebec, and French in the other provinces. In two decisions, the Supreme Court has held that the guarantee of minority language schools must be interpreted consistently with the guarantee of separate and denominational schools (in the provinces which have religious school guarantees).

== Constitutional amendments ==
=== Newfoundland and Labrador: 1987, 1996, 1998 ===
Term 17 of the Newfoundland Terms of Union has been amended three times, using the bilateral amending process with the federal Parliament. The amendments eventually resulted in the abolition of religious-based schools:

- in 1987, a constitutional amendment added the Pentecostal churches to the group of denominations which could operate their own publicly-funded schools.
- in 1996, a second constitutional amendment reduced the scope of church control over the schools.
- in 1998, a third constitutional amendment eliminated publicly funded denominational schools, although schools could provide religious observances where requested by the parents.

=== Quebec, 1997 ===
By the late 20th century, social attitudes to religion had changed greatly in Quebec. With the Quiet Revolution, the Catholic church lost much of its influence, particularly in the area of education. In 1997, the government of Quebec proposed abolishing the denominational and separate schools, and organising the school system on French and English lines, consistent with section 23 of the Charter. To achieve that goal, in 1997 the National Assembly of Quebec instituted the bilateral amendment process under the Constitution Act, 1982, which provides that a constitutional provision which only applies to "one or more, but not all, provinces" can be amended by joint resolutions of the provincial assembly and the two houses of the federal Parliament, the House of Commons and the Senate. The National Assembly passed a resolution to amend the Constitution Act, 1867 by eliminating the application in Quebec of paragraphs (1) through (4) of section 93. The House of Commons and the Senate also passed the resolution, and the provision was added to the Constitution Act, 1867 as section 93A. Quebec's school system then became secular, divided between French and English schools.
