= Section 94A of the Constitution Act, 1867 =

Provision of the Constitution of Canada

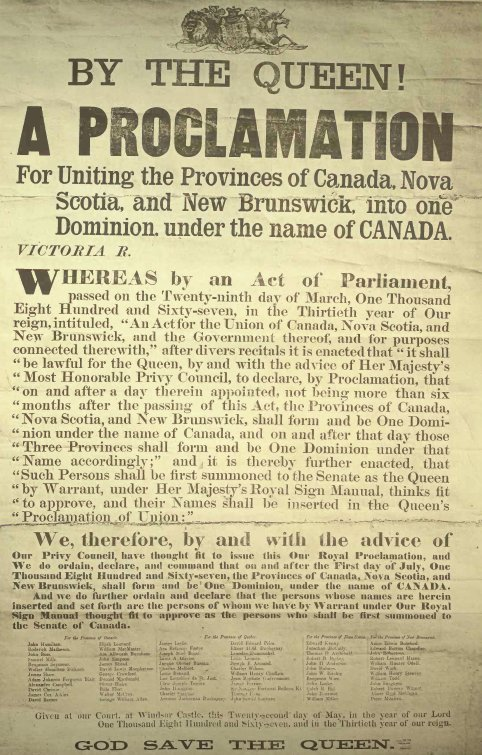
Proclamation bringing the Constitution Act into force, July 1, 1867

Section 94A of the Constitution Act, 1867 (French: article 94A de la Loi constitutionnelle de 1867) is a provision of the Constitution of Canada relating to old age pensions and supplemental benefits. It was originally added to the Constitution Act, 1867 in 1951, dealing with old age pensions. It was expanded by a further constitutional amendment in 1964 to include supplemental benefits, such as disability benefits and benefits for young survivors of pensioners.

The Constitution Act, 1867 is the constitutional statute which established Canada. Originally named the British North America Act, 1867, the Act continues to be the foundational statute for the Constitution of Canada, although it has been amended many times since 1867. It is now recognised as part of the supreme law of Canada.

== Constitution Act, 1867 ==
The Constitution Act, 1867 is part of the Constitution of Canada and thus part of the supreme law of Canada. It was the product of extensive negotiations by the governments of the British North American provinces in the 1860s. The Act sets out the constitutional framework of Canada, including structure of the federal government and the powers of the federal government and the provinces. Originally enacted in 1867 by the British Parliament under the name the British North America Act, 1867, in 1982 the Act was brought under full Canadian control through the Patriation of the Constitution, and was renamed the Constitution Act, 1867. Since Patriation the Act can only be amended in Canada, under the amending formula set out in the Constitution Act, 1982.

== Text of section 94A ==
Section 94A reads:

Legislation respecting old age pensions and supplementary benefits
94A. The Parliament of Canada may make laws in relation to old age pensions and supplementary benefits, including survivors’ and disability benefits irrespective of age, but no such law shall affect the operation of any law present or future of a provincial legislature in relation to any such matter.

Section 94A is found in Part VI of the Constitution Act, 1867, dealing with the distribution of legislative powers. It was not in the Constitution Act, 1867 as originally enacted.

== Amendments ==
Section 94A was added to the Constitution Act, 1867 by a constitutional amendment in 1951. As originally enacted, it gave the federal Parliament legislative authority to enact laws relating to old age pensions, but without reducing provincial power to provide for pensions. It has been amended once since then, to authorise Parliament to provide for supplemental benefits in addition to pensions.

== Purpose and interpretation ==
Prior to section 94A being enacted, the provinces had sole jurisdiction over old age pensions. In 1927 the federal government and the provinces agreed on a joint-cost funding system for old age pensions. The cost was shared equally by the federal and provincial governments, and the pensions were administered by the provinces under provincial legislation. Following World War II, the federal government took a more expansive view of the need for national social programmes and solicited provincial support for a constitutional amendment to give the federal Parliament jurisdiction to provide old age pensions. Section 94A was enacted in 1951 authorising federal old age pensions, but with the condition that no federal pension law would affect the operation of any provincial pension law.

The 1951 version of section 94A only authorised the federal Parliament to create old age pensions, but not supplemental benefits. The current version of section 94A was enacted by constitutional amendment in 1964 to include supplemental benefits, but still with the proviso that any federal pension law would not affect provincial pension laws. This amendment allowed Parliament to include benefits for young survivors of pensioners, or disabled contributors.

Under the authority of section 94A, in 1951, the federal Parliament passed the Old Age Security Act to provide pensions and guaranteed income supplements. In 1965, Parliament passed legislation to create the Canada Pension Plan, which applies in all provinces except Quebec. Instead, Quebec has created a provincial plan, the Quebec Pension Plan, which is very similar to the Canada Pension Plan.

== Related provisions ==
Provincial jurisdiction over pensions and supplementary benefits is based on section 92(13) of the Constitution Act, 1867. Section 94A confirmed that it does not affect that provincial jurisdiction.

Section 94A is unique in providing that in case of conflict between a federal old age pension law and a provincial pension law, the provincial law prevails. The normal rule in division of powers analysis is the doctrine of paramountcy, which provides that in case of conflict between a federal law and a provincial law, the federal law prevails.
