= Section 94 of the Constitution Act, 1867 =

Provision of the Constitution of Canada

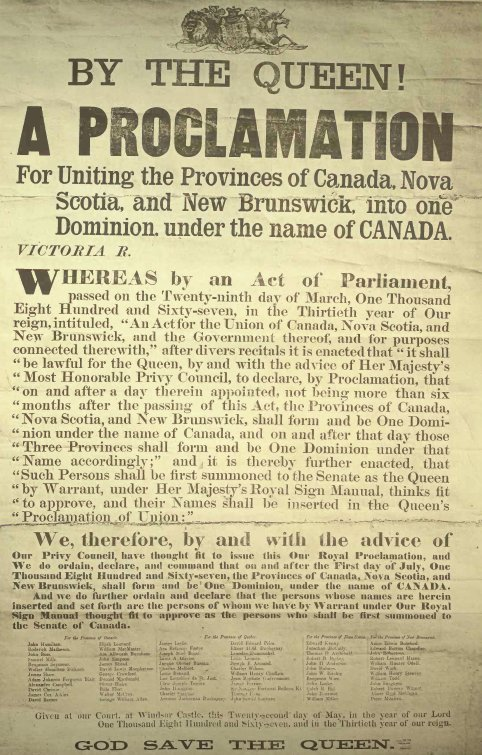
Proclamation bringing the Constitution Act into force, July 1, 1867

Section 94 of the Constitution Act, 1867 (French: article 94 de la Loi constitutionnelle de 1867) is a provision of the Constitution of Canada allowing the federal Parliament to implement uniform laws relating to property and civil rights, and procedure in the civil courts, in three of the original provinces: New Brunswick, Nova Scotia, and Ontario. The power under section 94 cannot be used without the consent of those provinces, as those subject matters are normally within exclusive provincial jurisdiction. The power has never been used.

The Constitution Act, 1867 is the constitutional statute which established Canada. Originally named the British North America Act, 1867, the Act continues to be the foundational statute for the Constitution of Canada, although it has been amended many times since 1867. It is now recognised as part of the supreme law of Canada.

== Constitution Act, 1867 ==
The Constitution Act, 1867 is part of the Constitution of Canada and thus part of the supreme law of Canada. It was the product of extensive negotiations by the governments of the British North American provinces in the 1860s. The Act sets out the constitutional framework of Canada, including the structure of the federal government and the powers of the federal government and the provinces. Originally enacted in 1867 by the British Parliament under the name the British North America Act, 1867, in 1982 the Act was brought under full Canadian control through the Patriation of the Constitution, and was renamed the Constitution Act, 1867. Since Patriation the Act can only be amended in Canada, under the amending formula set out in the Constitution Act, 1982.

== Text of section 94 ==
Section 94 reads:

Legislation for Uniformity of Laws in Three Provinces.
94. Notwithstanding anything in this Act, the Parliament of Canada may make Provision for the Uniformity of all or any of the Laws relative to Property and Civil Rights in Ontario, Nova Scotia, and New Brunswick, and of the Procedure of all or any of the Courts in those Three Provinces, and from and after the passing of any Act in that Behalf the Power of the Parliament of Canada to make Laws in relation to any Matter comprised in any such Act shall, notwithstanding anything in this Act, be unrestricted; but any Act of the Parliament of Canada making Provision for such Uniformity shall not have effect in any Province unless and until it is adopted and enacted as Law by the Legislature thereof.

Section 94 is found in Part VI of the Constitution Act, 1867, dealing with the distribution of legislative powers. It has not been amended or used since the Act was enacted in 1867.

== Purpose and interpretation ==
At the time of Confederation, some of the Fathers of Confederation envisaged a highly centralised federal government. John A. Macdonald, a leading figure in the Confederation negotiations and the first prime minister of Canada, was a particular proponent of centralisation. Section 94 is an example of that approach, as it would allow the federal Parliament to assume jurisdiction over property and civil rights, which is normally a matter of exclusive provincial jurisdiction under section 92(13) of the Constitution Act, 1867, and over procedure in the civil courts, which is a matter of provincial jurisdiction under section 92(14). The provinces in question would first have to agree to the federal legislation, but after that, the matters covered by the legislation would be permanently transferred to federal jurisdiction.

The provision applies in the three original common law provinces: New Brunswick, Nova Scotia, and Ontario. It does not give the federal Parliament the power to assume jurisdiction over property and civil rights in Quebec, which uses a civil law system, nor court procedure in that province.

The provision has never been used. In 1869 the federal government of Prime Minister Macdonald appointed a commission to study a uniform bill. The commissioner, John Hamilton Gray, former premier of New Brunswick, gave his report in 1871, with suggestions for a draft uniform bill, but Parliament did not proceed with it. The matter was raised again in the House of Commons some 30 years later, when a Liberal backbencher, Benjamin Russell made a proposal to apply section 94. The matter was debated in the House of Commons, and strongly opposed by the Liberal minister of justice, Charles Fitzpatrick, who sarcastically commented that the first step in considering the matter "would be to ask the local legislatures how soon they are going to be disposed to commit suicide", a comment on the significance of the provincial jurisdiction over property and civil rights.

One noted constitutional scholar, F.R. Scott, has argued that the provinces did actually cede their jurisdiction over labour relations by agreeing to apply the federal Industrial Disputes Investigation Act, even though neither the federal Parliament nor the provincial legislatures referred to any transfer of jurisdiction. Scott acknowledged that no court had ever considered the possibility.

One other point is the scope of section 94. On its face, it only applies to the three original common law provinces, New Brunswick, Nova Scotia, and Ontario. Scott argued that by the nature of the provision, to create federal uniform jurisdiction, it should be read to include all provinces added to Confederation after 1867. He did acknowledge, however, that the constitutional provisions for the admission of the three Prairie provinces, Alberta, Manitoba and Saskatchewan, each contained clauses that suggested they would only be bound by provisions that applied to all the other provinces, which clearly section 94 did not.

== Related provisions ==
Section 92(13) gives the provinces exclusive jurisdiction over property and civil rights. Section 92(14) gives the provinces exclusive jurisdiction over procedure in civil courts.
