= Amendments to the Constitution of Canada =

Before 1982, modifying the Constitution of Canada primarily meant amending the British North America Act, 1867. Unlike most other constitutions, however, the Act had no amending formula; instead, changes were enacted through Acts of the Parliament of the United Kingdom (or "Imperial Parliament") called the British North America Acts.

Other Commonwealth countries had taken over the authority for constitutional amendment after the Statute of Westminster 1931, but at the time, Canada decided to allow the Parliament of the United Kingdom to retain the power "temporarily". Between 1931 and 1982, the federal government, on behalf of the House of Commons of Canada and the Senate, would issue an address to the British government requesting an amendment. The request would include a resolution containing the desired amendments, which in turn were always passed by the British Parliament with little or no debate.

With the Constitution Act, 1982, Canada took over the authority to amend its own constitution, achieving full sovereignty. Since then, amendments to the Constitution of Canada have been made using one of five amending formulas requiring consent of some combination of the House of Commons, Senate, and provincial legislatures.

== Amendment formulas ==
Demographic weight of each province (2021)
1. Ontario (38.6%)
2. Quebec (23.1%)
3. British Columbia (13.6%)
4. Alberta (11.6%)
5. Manitoba (3.64%)
6. Saskatchewan (3.07%)
7. Nova Scotia (2.63%)
8. New Brunswick (2.10%)
9. Newfoundland and Labrador (1.38%)
10. Prince Edward Island (0.42%)

As part of the patriation of the constitution in 1982 an amending formula was adopted in sections 38 to 49 of the Constitution Act, 1982.

According to this act, the amendment procedure is composed of different categories, depending on the part of the constitution to be amended.

=== Unanimous consent amendments ===
There are some parts of the constitution that can be modified only with the unanimous consent of all the provincial legislative assemblies plus the two Houses of Parliament. This does not affect the actual passing of the resolutions granting consent in each legislative chamber, which as usual requires a simple majority in that chamber – it is the final resolutions that must be unanimous. This formula is contained in section 41 of the Constitution Act, 1982, and is known as the "unanimity formula". It is reserved for the following matters:

- (a) the office of the Monarch, the Governor General and the Lieutenant Governor of a province;
- (b) the right of a province to a number of members in the House of Commons not less than the number of Senators by which the province is entitled to be represented at the time the Constitution Act, 1982, came into force;
- (c) subject to section 43, the use of the English or the French language;
- (d) the composition of the Supreme Court of Canada; and
- (e) changing the amendment procedure itself.

=== "7/50 formula" amendments ===
For some constitutional provisions, amendments can be passed only if identical resolutions are adopted by the House of Commons, the Senate and two-thirds or more of the provincial legislative assemblies (i.e. at least seven) representing at least 50 per cent of the total population of the provinces. This formula, which is outlined in section 38 of the Constitution Act, 1982, is officially referred to as the "general amendment procedure" and is known colloquially as the "7/50 formula". It is the amendment formula that applies when the amendment does not fall into any other category.

Once the procedure for the adoption of the amendment is followed successfully, the amendment is formalized as a proclamation of the Governor General in Council. Officially, therefore, the constitution is amended by Proclamation, and the issue of the Proclamation requires prior approval by resolutions of the House of Commons, the Senate, and the necessary number of provincial legislative assemblies.

The following matters are explicitly reserved to the "7/50 formula", by virtue of s. 42:

- (a) the principle of proportionate representation of the provinces in the House of Commons prescribed by the Constitution of Canada;
- (b) the powers of the Senate and the method of selecting Senators;
- (c) the number of members by which a province is entitled to be represented in the Senate and the residence qualifications of Senators;
- (d) subject to paragraph 41(d), the Supreme Court of Canada;
- (e) the extension of existing provinces into the territories; and
- (f) the establishment of new provinces.

No specific mention is made in the procedure for amendments affecting what falls within the federal/provincial distribution of powers. Therefore, they can be dealt with generally under s. 38, or with respect to specific provinces under s. 43. However, a s. 38 amendment in that regard will not apply to a province that has passed a resolution of dissent from it, and s. 40 states that a s. 38 amendment that transfers provincial jurisdiction over an education or cultural matter to Parliament must be accompanied by reasonable compensation by Canada to the provinces.

=== Provisions applying to one or more, but not all, provinces ===
According to s. 43, any amendment applying to one or more, but not all, provinces must be "authorized by resolution of the Senate and House of Commons and of the legislative assembly of each province to which the amendment applies."

If a constitutional amendment affects only one province, only the assent of the two houses of Parliament and of that province's legislative assembly is required. Eight of the thirteen amendments passed since 1982 have been of this nature, four being passed by and for Newfoundland and Labrador, one for New Brunswick, one for Prince Edward Island, one for Quebec, and one for Saskatchewan. This formula is contained in section 43 of the Constitution Act, 1982.

=== Provisions concerning federal institutions ===
According to s. 44, constitutional provisions concerning federal institutions (executive government of Canada, Senate, and House of Commons) can be amended unilaterally by the Parliament of Canada if the provisions are not those explicitly reserved for unanimity or 7/50 formula. For example, in 2022, the Canadian government used this amendment method to modify the House of Commons seat allocation formula.

=== Provincial constitutions ===
According to s. 45, each province has the exclusive power to modify its own constitution, if the changes do not concern matters outlined in s. 41. This section has been the subject of much confusion and debate, since some provincial constitutions are embedded in the same documents that form the Constitution of Canada.

=== Bypassing the Senate ===
Section 47 allows an amendment to the Constitution of Canada to be made without a resolution of the Senate authorizing the issue of the proclamation if, within 180 days after the adoption by the House of Commons of a resolution authorizing its issue, the Senate has not adopted such a resolution and if, at any time after the expiration of that period, the House of Commons again adopts the resolution. Any period when Parliament is prorogued or dissolved shall not be counted in computing the 180-day period. Section 47 only applies to amendments made under the Section 38(1) Amendment by General Procedure, the Section 41 Amendment by Unanimous Consent, Section 42 and the Section 43 Amendment by Bilateral Agreement procedures

== Amendments before 1982 ==
A majority of the constitutional amendments before 1982 were acts of the United Kingdom or Canadian parliaments to amend the British North America Act, 1867 (now the Constitution Act, 1867). In some cases, amendments were made to the constitutional structure of Canada by adding entire extra documents to the constitution. These include orders that added provinces to Canada, such as the British Columbia Terms of Union and documents that altered the structure of the government of Canada, such as the Parliament of Canada Act, 1875.

List of Constitutional amendments from 1867 to 1982
Name	Year	Amendments to other constitutional documents	Status (as of 2022)
Rupert's Land Act 1868	1868	none	Spent when Rupert's Land and North-Western Territory Order came into effect.
Temporary Government of Rupert's Land Act, 1869	1869	none	Expired on 14 April 1871.
An Act to amend and continue the Act 32–33 Victoria chapter 3; and to establish and provide for the Government of the Province of Manitoba, 1870	1870	Section 21 of the Constitution Act, 1867	In the Constitution under the name Manitoba Act, 1870.
Order of Her Majesty in Council admitting Rupert's Land and the North-Western Territory into the Union, dated the 23rd day of June 1870	1870	none	In the constitution under the name Rupert's Land and North-Western Territory Order.
Order of Her Majesty in Council admitting British Columbia into the Union, dated the 16th day of May 1871.	1871	Section 21 of the Constitution Act, 1867	In the constitution under the name British Columbia Terms of Union.
British North America Act, 1871	1871	none	In the constitution under the name Constitution Act, 1871.
Order of Her Majesty in Council admitting Prince Edward Island into the Union, dated the 26th day of June 1873.	1873	none	In the Constitution under the name Prince Edward Island Terms of Union.
Parliament of Canada Act, 1875	1875	Section 18 of the Constitution Act, 1867	In the constitution under the same name.
Order of Her Majesty in Council admitting all British possessions and Territories in North America and islands adjacent thereto into the Union, dated the 31st day of July 1880.	1880	none	In the constitution under the name Adjacent Territories Order.
British North America Act, 1886	1886	none	In the constitution under the name Constitution Act, 1886.
Canada (Ontario Boundary) Act, 1889	1889	none	In the constitution under the same name.
Statute Law Revision Act, 1893	1893	Enacting clause and sections 2, 4, 25, 42, 43, 51, 81, 88, 89, 127, 145 of the Constitution Act, 1867	Spent.
Canadian Speaker (Appointment of Deputy) Act, 1895	1895	none	Repealed in 1982.
The Alberta Act, 1905	1905	Section 21 of the Constitution Act, 1867	In the constitution under the name Alberta Act.
The Saskatchewan Act, 1905	1905	Section 21 of the Constitution Act, 1867	In the constitution under the name Saskatchewan Act.
British North America Act, 1907	1907	none	In the constitution under the name Constitution Act, 1907.
British North America Act, 1915	1915	Sections 21, 22, 26, 27, 28, 51A of the Constitution Act, 1867	In the constitution under the name Constitution Act, 1915.
British North America Act, 1916	1916	none	Repealed by Statute Law Revision Act, 1927.
Statute Law Revision Act, 1927	1927	Removed section 1(2) from the British North America Act, 1915 and repealed British North America Act, 1916.	Spent.
British North America Act, 1930	1930	none	In the constitution under the name Constitution Act, 1930.
Statute of Westminster, 1931	1931	none	In the constitution under the same name.
British North America Act, 1940	1940	Section 91(2A) of the Constitution Act, 1867	In the constitution under the name Constitution Act, 1940.
British North America Act, 1943	1943	Section 51 of the Constitution Act, 1867	Repealed in 1982.
British North America Act, 1946	1946	Section 51 of the Constitution Act, 1867	Repealed in 1982.
British North America Act, 1949	1949	Section 21, 22 of the Constitution Act, 1867	In the Constitution under the name Newfoundland Act.
British North America (No. 2) Act, 1949	1949	Section 91 of the Constitution Act, 1867	Repealed in 1982.
Statute Law Revision Act, 1950	1950	Removed the redundant section 118 of the Constitution Act, 1867.	Spent.
British North America Act, 1951	1951	Section 94A of the Constitution Act, 1867	Repealed in 1982.
British North America Act, 1952	1952	Section 51 of the Constitution Act, 1867	Repealed in 1982.
British North America Act, 1960	1960	Section 99 of the Constitution Act, 1867	In the constitution under the name Constitution Act, 1960.
British North America Act, 1964	1964	Section 94(A) of the Constitution Act, 1867	In the constitution under the name Constitution Act, 1964.
British North America Act, 1965	1965	Section 29 of the Constitution Act, 1867	In the constitution under the name Constitution Act, 1965.
British North America Act, 1974	1974	Section 51(1) of the Constitution Act, 1867	In the constitution under the name Constitution Act, 1974.
British North America Act (No. 1), 1975 (previously named Northwest Territories Representation Act)	1975	Section 51(2) of the Constitution Act, 1867	Repealed in 1999 after being renamed Constitution Act (No. 1), 1975.
British North America Act (No. 2), 1975	1975	Sections 21, 22, 28 of the Constitution Act, 1867	In the constitution under the name Constitution Act (No. 2), 1975.
Miscellaneous Statute Law Revision Act, 1977	1977	Renamed constitutional documents that were, again renamed by the Constitution Act, 1982.	Spent.
Canada Act 1982	1982	none	In the constitution under the same name.
Constitution Act, 1982	1982	Sections 1, 20, 51, 91(1), 92(1), 92A(6), 94A, Sixth Schedule of the Constitution Act, 1867	In the constitution under the same name.

== Amendments after 1982 ==
Amending the constitution has been a topic of much debate in contemporary Canada, and the two most comprehensive attempts to revise the document have both been defeated. There have, however, been thirteen amendments to the constitution since it was amended in 1982. Most of these amendments have been limited in scope, dealing only with matters affecting specific provinces.

List of Constitutional amendments after 1982
Name	Section(s) amended	Purpose and notes	Amending procedure
Constitution Amendment Proclamation, 1983	ss. 25(b), 35(3)–(4), 35.1, 37.1, 54.1, and 61 of Constitution Act, 1982	Strengthened Aboriginal rights in the constitution. Includes land claims agreements as treaties.	s. 38: 7/50 rule
Constitution Act, 1985 (Representation)	s. 51(1) of Constitution Act, 1867	Modified the formula for apportioning seats in the House of Commons. Amendment was replaced by Fair Representation Act in 2011.	s. 44: Parliament of Canada
Constitution Amendment, 1987	s. 3 of Newfoundland Act and term 17 of schedule to that Act	Extended education rights to the Pentecostal Church in Newfoundland. Replaced by Constitution Amendment, 1998 (Newfoundland Act).	s. 43: House of Commons, Senate and Newfoundland House of Assembly
Constitution Amendment, 1993 (New Brunswick)	s. 16.1 of Constitution Act, 1982	Added Section 16.1 to the Canadian Charter of Rights and Freedoms, which made the English and French linguistic communities in New Brunswick equal, with the right to distinct cultural and educational institutions.	s. 43: House of Commons, Senate and New Brunswick Legislative Assembly
Constitution Amendment, 1993 (Prince Edward Island)	schedule to Prince Edward Island Terms of Union	Allowed for a fixed link bridge to replace ferry services to Prince Edward Island.	s. 43: House of Commons, Senate and PEI Legislative Assembly
Constitution Amendment, 1997 (Newfoundland Act)	term 17 of schedule to Newfoundland Act	Allowed the Province of Newfoundland to create a secular school system to replace the church-based education system.	s. 43: House of Commons and Newfoundland House of Assembly; Senate approval was bypassed with s. 47
Constitution Amendment, 1997 (Quebec)	s. 93A of Constitution Act, 1867	Permitted the Province of Quebec to replace the denominational school boards with ones organized on linguistic lines. NB: The preamble to the resolution of the Quebec National Assembly adopting the amendment makes no reference to which amending formula is being used, and includes the following statement: "Whereas such amendment in no way constitutes recognition by the National Assembly of the Constitution Act, 1982, which was adopted without its consent."	s. 43: House of Commons, Senate and Quebec National Assembly
Constitution Amendment, 1998 (Newfoundland Act)	term 17 of schedule to Newfoundland Act	Ended denominational quotas for Newfoundland religion classes.	s. 43: House of Commons, Senate and Newfoundland House of Assembly
Constitution Act, 1999 (Nunavut)	ss. 21, 23, 28, and 51(2) of Constitution Act, 1867	Granted the Territory of Nunavut representation in the Senate of Canada. NB: At the time of the Act's adoption, Leader of the Opposition Preston Manning argued that both this Act and the Nunavut Act of 1993 ought to have been adopted using a more inclusive amendment formula (probably the 7/50 formula), and that the failure to use the appropriate formula could result in future constitutional difficulties.	s. 44: Parliament of Canada
Constitution Amendment, 2001 (Newfoundland and Labrador)	every instance of the word "Newfoundland" in the schedule to Newfoundland Act	Changed the name of the "Province of Newfoundland" to the "Province of Newfoundland and Labrador".	s. 43: House of Commons, Senate and Newfoundland House of Assembly
Fair Representation Act, 2011	s. 51(1),(1.1) of Constitution Act, 1867	Modified the formula for apportioning seats in the House of Commons.	s. 44: Parliament of Canada
Constitution Amendment, 2022 (Saskatchewan Act)	s. 24 of the Saskatchewan Act repealed retroactive to 29 August 1966	Removed a historic tax exemption specific to the Canadian Pacific Railway.	s. 43: House of Commons, Senate and Saskatchewan Legislative Assembly
Preserving Provincial Representation in the House of Commons Act (2022)	s. 51(1) of Constitution Act, 1867	Modified the formula for apportioning seats in the House of Commons.	s. 44: Parliament of Canada

== Amendments to provincial constitutions ==
Section 45 of the Constitution Act, 1982 allows provinces to amend their own provincial constitutions. However, many parts of provincial constitutions are embedded in documents forming part of the Constitution of Canada, and could require approval of the Senate and House of Commons under the section 43 amending formula. Various methods have been used to amend provincial constitutions without invoking section 43, but not all have been tested in court.

In Alberta, the Constitution of Alberta Amendment Act, 1990 limits powers of the province's legislative assembly by requiring consent of Metis settlement members to change laws regarding expropriation of Metis land. Courts have not yet ruled about whether this kind of language really would bind future legislatures, but it might do so if the higher bar was met when creating the law.

British Columbia has an Act titled Constitution Act that outlines the powers and rules governing the executive and legislative branches of the provincial government. However, the act specifically says that it is subject to the Constitution Act, 1867 and the British Columbia Terms of Union, presumably because a section 43 amendment would be needed to change any part of the British Columbia Constitution contained in those documents.

Quebec and Saskatchewan both passed amendments to their provincial constitutions framed as amendments to the Constitution of Canada. In 2021, the Quebec parliament passed a bill titled An Act respecting French, the official and common language of Quebec, which was largely amendments to the Charter of the French Language. The act purports to add sections 90Q.1 and 90Q.2 to the Constitution Act, 1867, which provide that Quebecers form a nation and that French is the only official language of Quebec. Because the House of Commons did not authorize these additions to the Constitution Act, 1867, they would only have effect if they were amendments to the constitution of Quebec made by the section 45 amending process. Constitutional scholars are divided on the validity of an amendment to a provincial constitution framed as an addition to part of the Constitution of Canada. An official at the Department of Justice, in June 2022, stated to Le Devoir that the additions to the constitution ostensibly made by the Quebec Legislature, through its Act respecting French, the official and common language of Quebec, would be "reproduced in the codification of the constitutional laws [...] in the next update". Sections 90Q.1, 90Q.2, 90S.1 and 128Q.1 have been effectively added to the text of the Constitution Act, 1867, by the federal government on 1 January 2024.

Following Quebec's action, legislation passed by the Parliament of Québec in 2022 and by the parliament of Saskatchewan in 2023 purport to add sections 128Q.1 and section 90S.1 to the Constitution Act, 1867. Section 128Q.1 exempts members of Quebec's legislative assembly from the oath required by section 128 and section 90S.1 declares, among other things, that Saskatchewan has autonomy with respect to all matters falling under its exclusive jurisdiction.

Amendments to provincial constitutions purporting to amend the Constitution of Canada
Name	Section(s) amended	Purpose and notes	Amending procedure
An Act respecting French, the official and common language of Quebec (2022)	ss. 90Q.1 and 90Q.2 of Constitution Act, 1867	Added Sections 90Q.1 and 90Q.2 to the Constitution Act, 1867, which provide that Quebecers form a nation and that French is the only official language of Quebec.	s. 45: Parliament of Quebec
An Act to recognize the oath provided in the Act respecting the National Assembly as the sole oath required in order to sit in the Assembly (2022)	s. 128Q.1 of Constitution Act, 1867	Deleted the Oath of Allegiance to the Canadian monarch from the Oath of Office in Quebec's National Assembly.	s. 45: Parliament of Quebec
The Saskatchewan First Act (2023)	s. 90S.1 of Constitution Act, 1867 and s. 3.1 of the Saskatchewan Act	Added Section 90S.1 to the Constitution Act, 1867, and Section 3.1 to the Saskatchewan Act, which provide that Saskatchewan has autonomy with respect to all of the matters falling under its exclusive legislative jurisdiction.	s. 45: Parliament of Saskatchewan

== Debate ==
Amending the Canadian constitution is a topic of great debate in Canada. There seems to be general agreement among provincial governments that some parts of the constitution need to be amended to deal with long-standing demands from many provinces. There are demands by western provinces for a greater share of power at the federal level, and demands from Quebec for greater protection for its status as a distinct society. Quebec, in particular, has not formally agreed to the Constitution Act, 1982, although this does not affect the legal applicability of the Act.

Nevertheless, agreement on details of amendments has been elusive. Further complicating attempts to amend the constitution is the complexity of the procedure for doing so, which in most cases requires approval from both the federal government and two-thirds of the provincial governments representing at least 50 per cent of the population, and in some cases require the approval of the federal government and all ten provincial governments.

There have been several amendments to the constitution since it was patriated in 1982 including amendments dealing with provincial schooling in Newfoundland and Quebec and the changing of the name of Newfoundland to Newfoundland and Labrador (see below).

Although the amending formula has not been formally altered, the Canadian government under Prime Minister Jean Chrétien after the 1995 Quebec referendum recognized regional vetoes over proposed amendments, held by the provinces of Ontario, Quebec and British Columbia, and by the regions the Prairies (Alberta, Saskatchewan and Manitoba) and the Atlantic (New Brunswick, Nova Scotia, Newfoundland and Labrador, and Prince Edward Island).

=== Failed attempts ===
The 1987 Meech Lake Accord, a package of constitutional amendments, intended to address Quebec's objections to the Constitution Act, 1982, failed in 1990 when it was not ratified by all ten provincial governments. The last attempt at a comprehensive package of constitutional amendments was the Charlottetown Accord, which arose out of the failure of the Meech Lake Accord. The Charlottetown Accord was defeated in a national referendum in 1992.

=== Notwithstanding clause ===
Various provisions of the Canadian Constitution are subject to the notwithstanding clause, which is Section Thirty-three of the Canadian Charter of Rights and Freedoms. This section authorizes federal and provincial parliaments to temporarily override the rights and freedoms in sections 2 and 7–15 for up to five years, subject to renewal. The federal parliament has never invoked it, although provincial parliaments have done so.

The notwithstanding clause was invoked routinely between 1982 and 1985 by the Parliament of Quebec, which did not support the enactment of the Charter but is subject to it nonetheless. The parliaments of Saskatchewan and Alberta have also previously invoked the notwithstanding clause, to end a strike and to protect an exclusively heterosexual definition of marriage, respectively. (Alberta's use of the notwithstanding clause was ultimately of no force or effect, since the definition of marriage is solely a federal jurisdiction and same-sex marriage was legalized nationwide with the Civil Marriage Act.) The territory of Yukon also passed legislation once that invoked the notwithstanding clause, but the legislation was never proclaimed in force. In 2018, Ontario's provincial government threatened to invoke the notwithstanding clause after legislation changing the size of Toronto's city council in the middle of a municipal election campaign period was ruled unconstitutional by the Ontario Superior Court of Justice. The threat was dropped after the Ontario Court of Appeal overturned the lower court decision, ruling that the change was "unfair" but still constitutional.

=== Supreme Court of Canada in the amending formula ===
There has been a debate among legal scholars as to whether the Supreme Court of Canada is entrenched in the Constitution of Canada. The Supreme Court of Canada was not created by the constitution, rather the power to create a "Court of General Appeal for Canada" was granted to Parliament by s. 101 of the British North America Act, 1867. Parliament proceeded to create the Supreme Court of Canada under the authority of s. 101 in 1875 by passing the Supreme Court Act, which was an ordinary piece of legislation with no constitutional significance at the time.

The Supreme Court of Canada was mentioned for the first time in a constitutional document by the Constitution Act, 1982. The Supreme Court is referred to twice. First, s. 41 lists several amendments to the Constitution of Canada requiring unanimous consent. S. 41(d) includes the "composition of the Supreme Court of Canada" in this list. Second, s. 42(1) lists several amendments to the Constitution of Canada requiring the general amendment procedure. S. 42(1)(d) includes "subject to s. 41(d), the Supreme Court of Canada" in this list. Sections 41 and 42 of the Constitution Act, 1982, thus appear to include the Supreme Court of Canada in the Constitution of Canada. However, this conclusion is questionable because the "Constitution of Canada" is expressly defined in s. 52(2) as a set of 30 instruments that does not include the Supreme Court Act. Some scholars, including Peter Hogg, have suggested that the references to the Supreme Court of Canada in sections 41 and 42 are ineffective. They argue that these references are "anticipatory" and will become effective only if Parliament adds the Supreme Court Act to the list in s. 52(2). Other scholars, including Professor Cheffins, have argued that the Supreme Court Act is implied as entrenched into s. 52(2) because of sections 41 and 42. S. 52(2) uses the words "includes ..." to introduce the list of thirty instruments, suggesting that the provision does not contain an exhaustive list. The Supreme Court itself has confirmed in New Brunswick Broadcasting Co. v. Nova Scotia (Speaker of the House of Assembly), [1993] 1 S.C.R. 319 that s. 52(2) is not exhaustive, but has not yet ruled on whether the Supreme Court Act is included in the Constitution of Canada.

In Reference re Supreme Court Act, ss. 5 and 6 2014 SCC 21, a majority of the Supreme Court ruled that clauses concerning the appointment of Justices from Quebec are entrenched.

=== Succession to the Throne Act, 2013 ===
There was debate about whether the Succession to the Throne Act, 2013, a federal statute, was a constitutional amendment that should have been passed under the constitutional amending formula requiring unanimous provincial consent. The Canadian Parliament passed the act to give its assent to the Succession to the Crown Bill (then still under debate in the Parliament of the United Kingdom), which aimed to remove male preference in the line of succession to Britain's throne, consistent with the Perth Agreement of the Commonwealth realms. Two professors of law from the Université Laval, Geneviève Motard and Patrick Taillon, began a lawsuit in the Quebec courts, arguing that the amendment should have been enacted using the unanimous amending formula under section 41. The Superior Court of Quebec and the Quebec Court of Appeal both rejected the claim, holding that, according to the Statute of Westminster, 1931, a constitutional amendment is not required to match Canada's rules of succession to those of the United Kingdom. The Supreme Court of Canada denied leave to appeal.
