= Sections 90Q and 90S of the Constitution Act, 1867 =

Provision of the Constitution of Canada

The flags of Quebec and Saskatchewan, the provinces relevant to sections 90Q and 90S of the Constitution Act, 1867, respectively.

Sections 90Q and 90S of the Constitution Act, 1867 (French: articles 90Q et 90S de la Loi constitutionnelle de 1867) are provisions of the Constitution of Canada relating to the autonomy of the provinces of Quebec and Saskatchewan within the Canadian confederation, added in 2022 and 2023, respectively. These provisions were added to the Constitution by amendments made by their respective provincial legislative assemblies using the unilateral amending procedure set out in section 45 of the Constitution Act, 1982.

Section 90Q was added to the Canadian Constitution by the National Assembly of Quebec passing Bill 96 in 2022, which made updates to the Charter of the French Language, entrenching French as the only official language of Québec and French as the common language of the Québec nation.

Section 90S was added to the Canadian Constitution by the Saskatchewan Legislature passing the Saskatchewan First Act in 2023, which made changes to the Constitution of Saskatchewan, asserting Saskatchewan's autonomy and constitutional jurisdiction over its natural resources.

== Background ==
=== Constitution Act, 1867 ===
The Constitution Act, 1867 is part of the Constitution of Canada and thus part of the supreme law of Canada. It was the product of extensive negotiations by the governments of the British North American provinces in the 1860s. The Act sets out the constitutional framework of Canada, including the structure of the federal government and the powers of the federal government and the provinces.

Originally enacted in 1867 by the British Parliament under the name the British North America Act, 1867, in 1982 the Act was brought under full Canadian control through the Patriation of the Constitution, and was renamed the Constitution Act, 1867.

=== Section 45 of the Constitution Act, 1982 ===
Since Patriation, the Constitution Act, 1867 can only be amended in Canada, under the amending formula set out in the Constitution Act, 1982.

One of the means of amending the Constitution is provided in section 45, which reads as follows:

Amendments by provincial legislatures
45 Subject to section 41, the legislature of each province may exclusively make laws amending the constitution of the province.

It was under this unilateral amending procedure that the provinces of Quebec and Saskatchewan made amendments to the Constitution of Canada that added sections 90Q and 90S in 2022 and 2023, respectively.

== Section 90Q (Fundamental Characteristics of Quebec) ==
The location of Quebec in Canada.

=== Background ===
Quebec nationalism been a movement and a central issue in Quebec politics since the beginning of the 19th century, including the existence of Quebec as a nation, its future in Canada, and the status of the French language in the province and the country. In 1974, the Quebec Legislature passed the Official Language Act, making French the sole official language of Quebec and the primary language of services, commercial signing, labour relations and business, education, and legislation and justice. In 1977, this Official Language Act was superseded by the Charter of the French Language, which expanded and entrenched French within Quebec. After two failed referendums on sovereignty in 1980 and 1995, Quebec has remained in Canada. On November 27, 2006, the House of Commons of Canada passed a motion recognizing that the "Québécois form a nation within a united Canada".

=== Text of section 90Q ===
Section 90Q reads:

Quebec
90Q.1 Quebecers form a nation.

Quebec
90Q.2 French shall be the only official language of Quebec. It is also the common language of the Quebec nation.

=== Purpose and interpretation ===
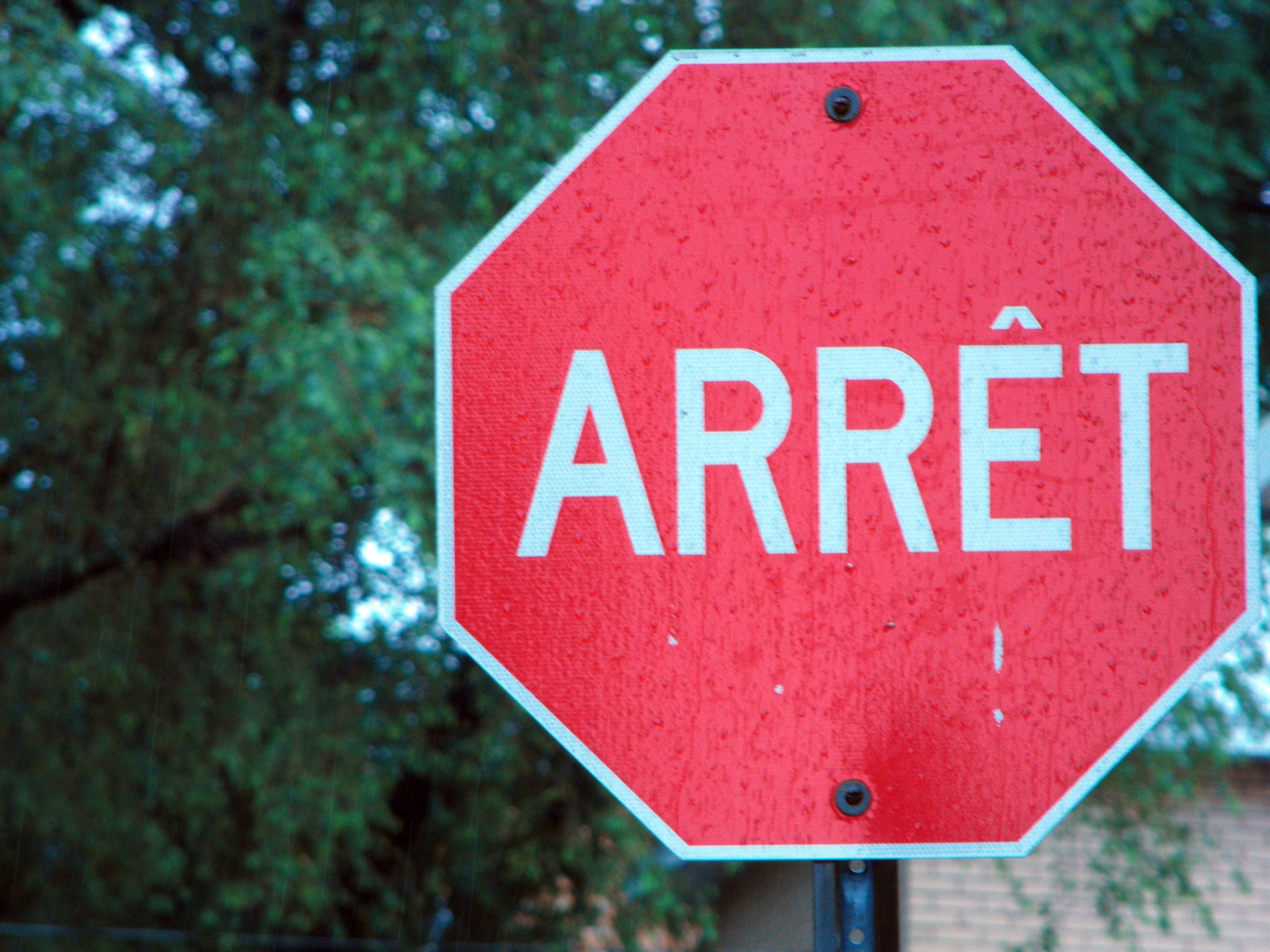
A French language stop sign in Quebec. The importance of the French language to Quebec is stressed in section 90Q of the Constitution Act, 1867.

Section 90Q was added to Part V of the Constitution Act, 1867, dealing with provincial constitutions. It was added to the Constitution Act, 1867 in 2022, by the Quebec provincial legislation titled An Act respecting French, the official and common language of Québec, S.Q. 2022, c. 14 (more commonly known as Bill 96), using the unilateral amending procedure set out in section 45 of the Constitution Act, 1982. It has not been amended since its enactment.

The passing of Bill 96 made updates to the Charter of the French Language, greatly expanding the requirement to speak French in many public and private settings. The preliminary notes of the bill make its purpose clear: "the purpose of this bill is to affirm that the only official language of Québec is French. It also affirms that French is the common language of the Québec nation." This act amended the Charter of the French language and introduced "new fundamental language rights," such as reinforcing French as the language of legislation, justice, civil administration, professional orders, employers, commerce and business, and educational instruction.

Premier François Legault and his Coalition Avenir Québec government justified this as necessary to preserve the French language that is central to Quebec nationalism. In response to this, the Bloc Québécois initiated a motion in the House of Commons endorsing the constitutionality of Legault's initiatives and reasserting Quebecers' nationhood. The Commons passed the motion 281–2, with 36 abstentions.

== Section 90S (Saskatchewan) ==
The location of Saskatchewan in Canada.

=== Background ===
Saskatchewan joined Canada in 1905 without control over its own natural resources. While the province received federal grants as compensation for this lack of resource control, it remained without this control until the natural resources acts in 1930, which gave the province, and other Western provinces, control of their own resources. Despite these acts, decisions of the Supreme Court of Canada in the 1970s would go on to limit the ability of the provinces to regulate the use of their natural resources.

When the Canadian constitution was patriated in 1982, Saskatchewan and Alberta, another Western Canadian province, insisted on the addition of Section 92A to the Constitution Act, 1867, which deals with provincial jurisdiction over natural resources. Despite this, Western alienation, the view that Canada’s western provinces have been marginalized within Confederation, has persisted to present day, being espoused most prominently by the Reform Party of Canada, which served as the federal Official Opposition from 1997 to 2000. Rationale for Western alienation extends beyond resource rights to other federal policies such as carbon pricing, equalization payments, and firearms buyback programs.

The incumbent Saskatchewan Party government, led by Premier Scott Moe since 2018, has been a persistent critic of federal environmental legislation, calling for a "New Deal with Canada" after the 2019 federal election, with demands including expanded provincial powers in such as immigration, taxation, and policing. Moe reiterated these calls after the 2021 federal election, suggesting that Saskatchewan should be considered a "nation within a nation".

=== Text of section 90S ===
Section 90S reads:

Saskatchewan
90S.1 (1) Saskatchewan has autonomy with respect to all of the matters falling under its exclusive legislative jurisdiction pursuant to this Act.

(2) Saskatchewan is and always has been dependent on agriculture, and on the development of its non-renewable natural resources, forestry resources and electrical energy generation and production.

(3) Saskatchewan’s ability to control the development of its non-renewable natural resources, its forestry resources and its electrical energy generation and production is critical to the future well-being and prosperity of Saskatchewan and its people.

=== Purpose and interpretation ===
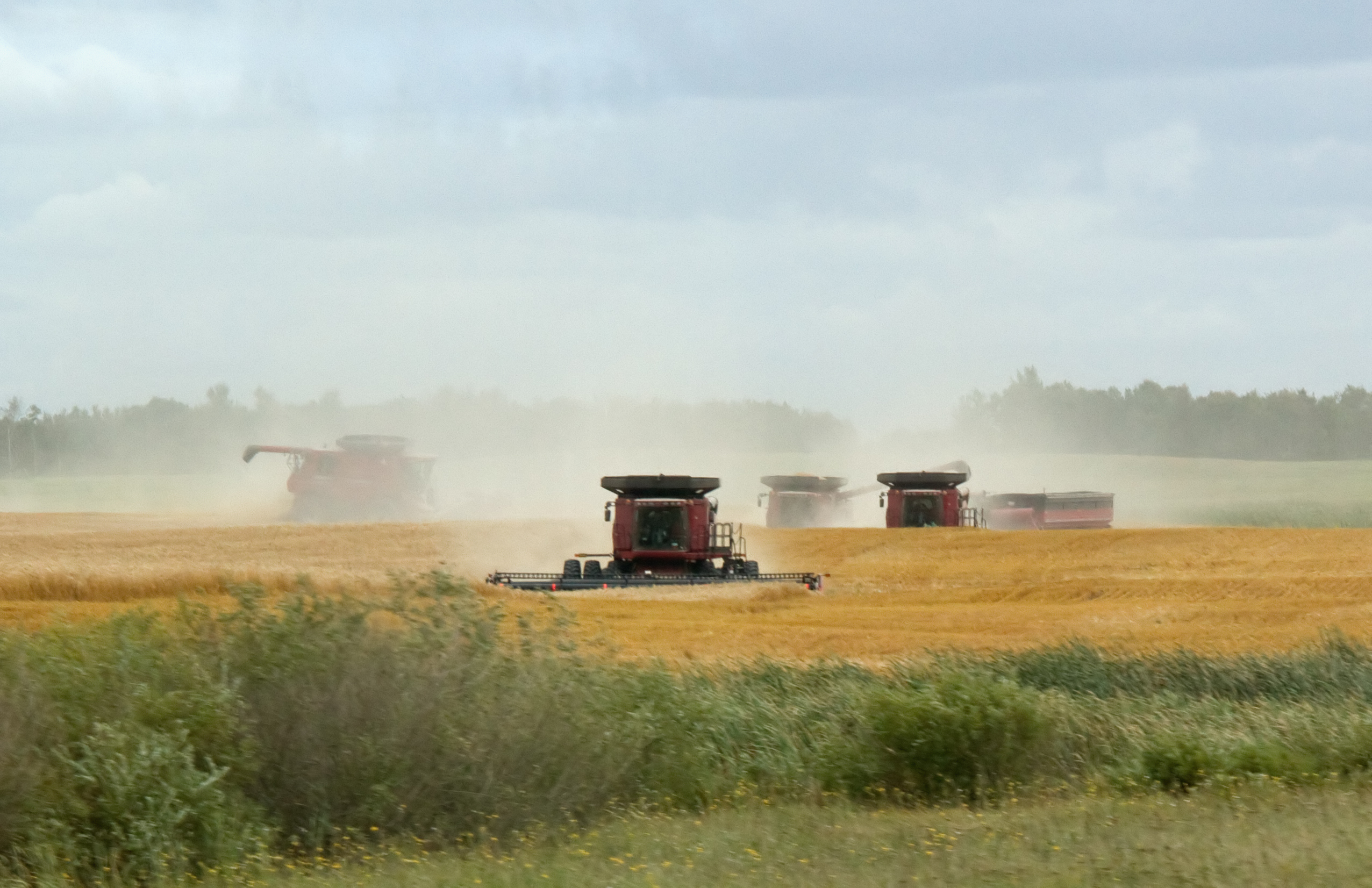
Harvesting in Saskatchewan. The importance of agriculture, among other industries, to Saskatchewan is stressed in section 90S of the Constitution Act, 1867.

Section 90S was added to Part V of the Constitution Act, 1867, dealing with provincial constitutions. It was added to the Constitution Act, 1867 in 2023, by the Saskatchewan provincial legislation titled The Saskatchewan First Act, 2023, c. 9, using the unilateral amending procedure set out in section 45 of the Constitution Act, 1982. It has not been amended since its enactment.

The Saskatchewan First Act passed on March 16, 2023. The governing Saskatchewan Party stated that the purpose of the act was to confirm Saskatchewan's autonomy and to re-assert its constitutional jurisdiction over natural resources, as laid out in section 92A of the Constitution Act, 1867.

The act has faced opposition from various groups, including Indigenous nations.

== Related provisions ==
Section 92 of the Constitution Act, 1867, which sets out the legislative powers of the provinces.

Section 92A of the Constitution Act, 1867, which relates to provincial jurisdiction over natural resources.

Section 45 of the Constitution Act, 1982, which made possible these amendments.

Section 128Q.1 of the Constitution Act, 1867, which uses the same amending procedure as 90Q to exempt Quebec from Section 128.

== See also ==
- Autonomism (political doctrine)
- Canadian federalism
- Western alienation
