= British North America =

British possessions from 1783 to 1907

Coordinates: 44.96°N 74.67°W

- 1783–1907
- (left) Flag of Great Britain (1707–1801) (right) Flag of the United Kingdom (1801 onward)
- Anthem: God Save the King/Queen
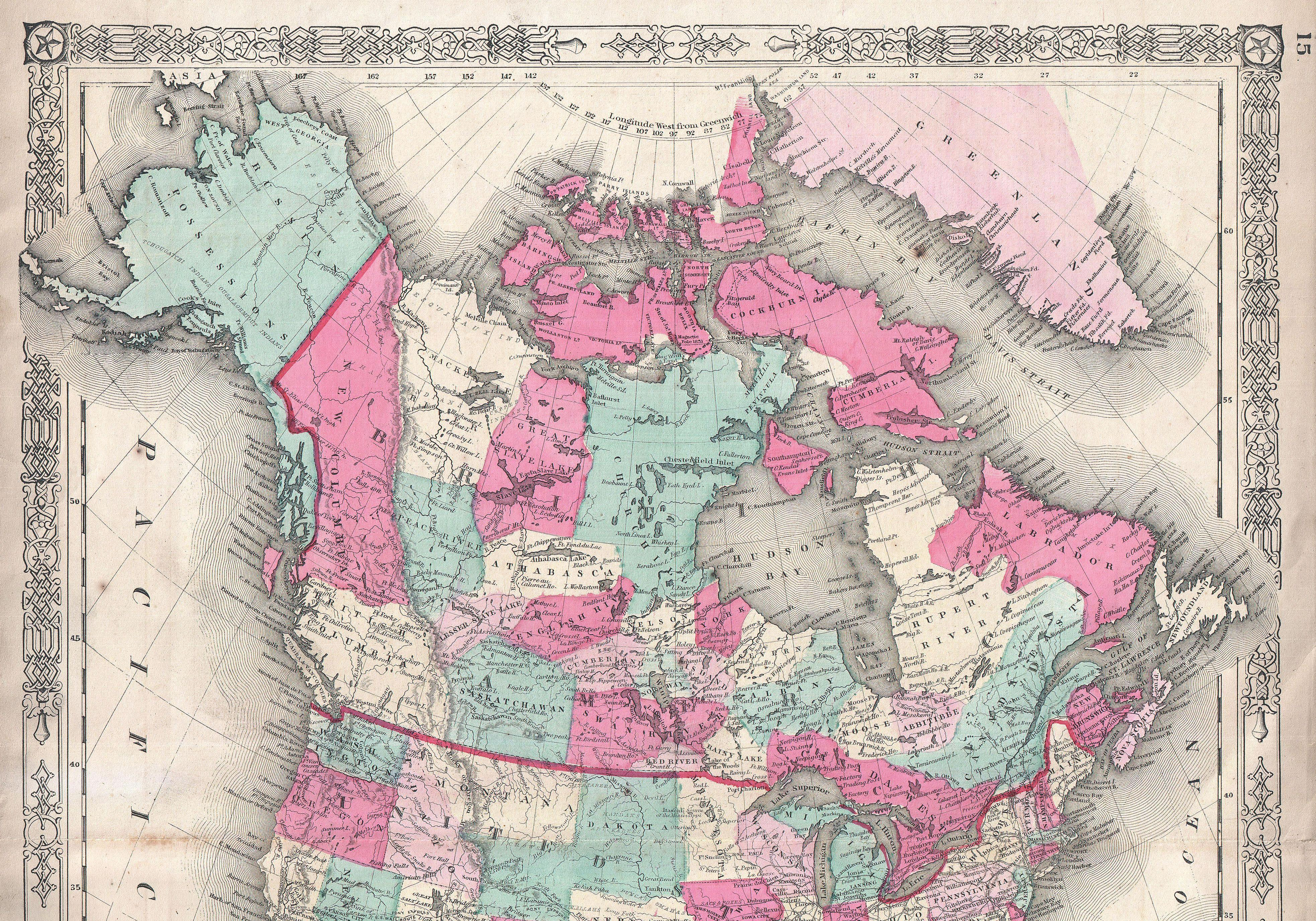
- British North America c. 1864
- Status: Colonies of Great Britain (1783–1800); Colonies of the United Kingdom of Great Britain and Ireland (1801–1907)
- Capital: Administered from London, England
- Common languages: English, French, Gaelic
- Religion: Christianity; Protestantism; Catholic Church
- Monarch
  - 1783–1820: George III
  - 1820–1830: George IV
  - 1830–1837: William IV
  - 1837–1901: Victoria
  - 1901–1907: Edward VII
- History
  - Treaty of Paris: 1783
  - Jay Treaty: 1794
  - Treaty of 1818: 1818
  - British North America Act, 1867: 1867
  - Rupert's Land Act: 1868
  - British North America Act, 1871: 1871
  - British Columbia Terms of Union: 1871
  - Prince Edward Island Terms of Union: 1873
  - Adjacent Territories Order: 1880
  - 1907 Imperial Conference: 1907
- Currency: Pound sterling; Made Beaver; Canadian pound; Newfoundland dollar; Nova Scotian dollar; New Brunswick dollar; Prince Edward Island dollar; British Columbia dollar; Canadian dollar
- ISO 3166 code: GB
Preceded by
| British America |
Succeeded by
| Canada |
| Dominion of Newfoundland |
| Bermuda^{a} |
- Today part of: Bermuda; Canada
- 1. Colony thenceforth grouped for convenience with British West Indies

British North America comprised the colonial territories of Great Britain and later the United Kingdom in North America from 1783 onwards. English colonisation of North America began in the 16th century in Newfoundland, then further south at Roanoke and Jamestown, Virginia, and more substantially with the founding of the Thirteen Colonies along the Atlantic coast of North America.

Britain's colonial territories in North America were greatly expanded by the Treaty of Paris (1763), which formally concluded the Seven Years' War, referred to by the English colonies in North America as the French and Indian War, and by the French colonies as la Guerre de la Conquête. With the ultimate acquisition of most of New France (Nouvelle-France), British territory in North America was more than doubled in size, and the exclusion of France also dramatically altered the political landscape of the continent.

The term British America was used to refer to the British Empire's colonial territories in North America prior to the United States Declaration of Independence, most famously in the 1774 address of Thomas Jefferson to the First Continental Congress entitled: A Summary View of the Rights of British America.

The term British North America was initially used following the subsequent 1783 Treaty of Paris, which concluded the American Revolutionary War and confirmed the independence of Great Britain's Thirteen Colonies that formed the United States of America. The terms British America and British North America continued to be used for Britain's remaining territories in North America, but the term British North America came to be used more consistently in connection with the provinces that would eventually form Canada, following the Report on the Affairs of British North America (1839), called the Durham Report.

The Dominion of Canada was formed under the British North America Act, 1867 ("BNA Act", "Constitution Act, 1867"). Following royal assent of the BNA Act, three of the provinces of British North America (New Brunswick, Nova Scotia, and the Province of Canada (which would become the Canadian provinces of Ontario and Quebec)) joined to form "One Dominion under the Crown of the United Kingdom of Great Britain and Ireland, with a Constitution similar in Principle to that of the United Kingdom," on July 1, 1867, the date of Canadian Confederation.

The Atlantic archipelago of Bermuda (originally administered by the Virginia Company and, with the Bahamas, considered with North America prior to 1783), was grouped with the Maritime provinces from 1783, but after the formation of the Dominion of Canada in 1867 and the achievement of dominion status by the colony of Newfoundland in 1907, Bermuda was thereafter administered generally with the colonies in the British West Indies (although the Church of England continued to place Bermuda under the Bishop of Newfoundland until 1919).

Over its duration, British North America comprised the British Empire's colonial territories in North America from 1783 to 1907, not including the Caribbean. These territories include those forming modern-day Canada and Bermuda, having also ceded what became all or large parts of six Midwestern U.S. states (Ohio, Indiana, Illinois, Michigan, Wisconsin, and the northeastern part of Minnesota), which were formed out of the Northwest Territory, large parts of Maine, which had originally been within the French territory of Acadia, and very briefly, East Florida, West Florida, and the Bahamas.

== Political divisions ==
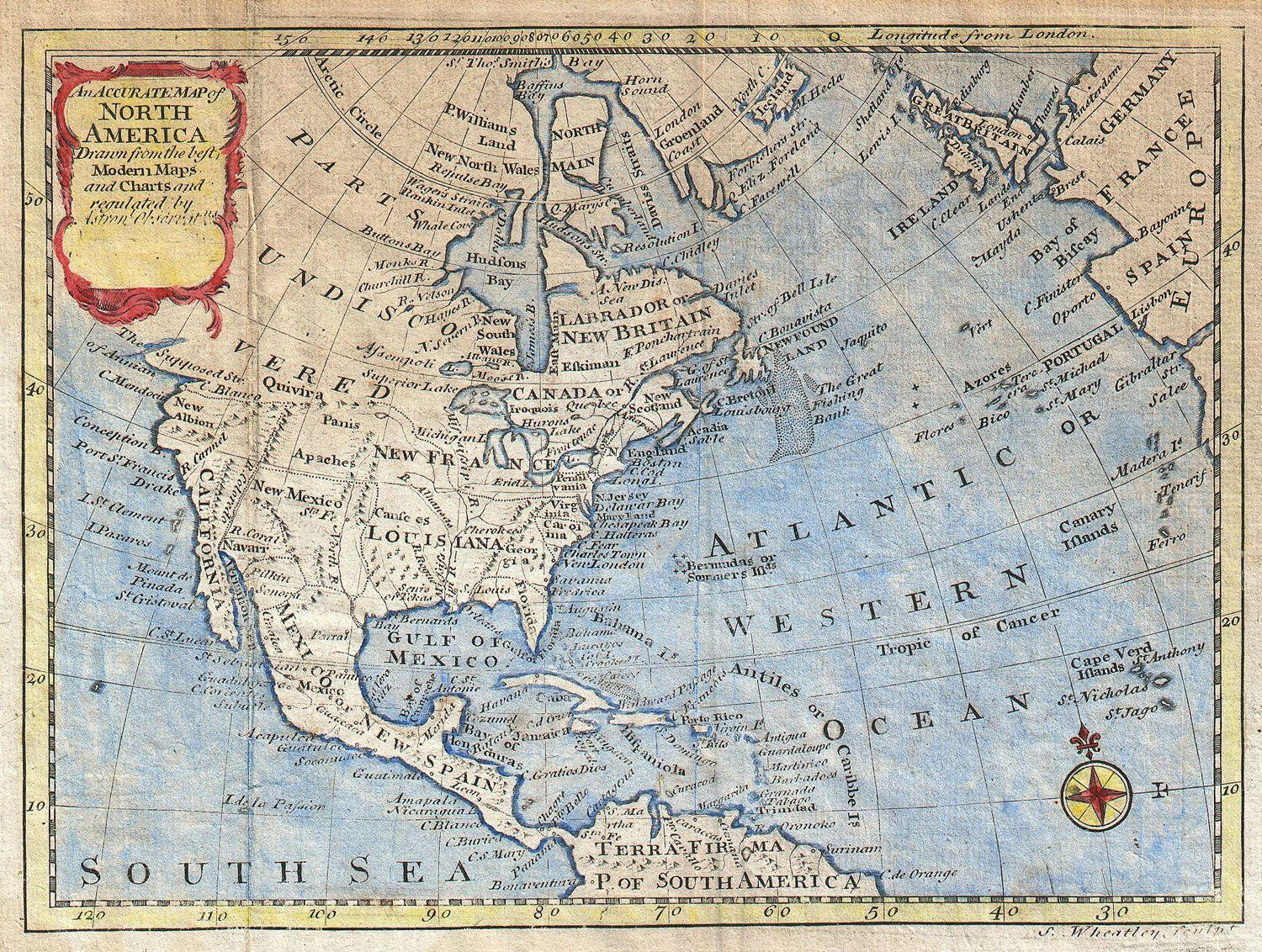
British North America c. 1747

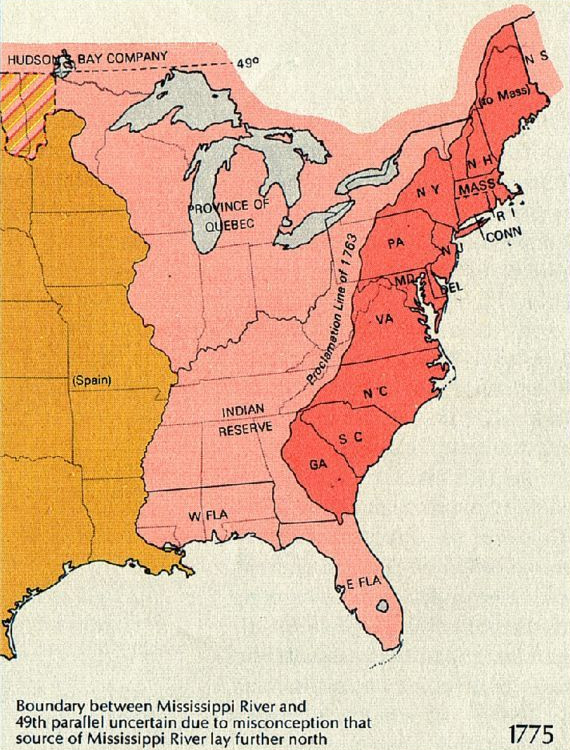
British North America in 1775; the original Thirteen Colonies (1607–1776), are shown in red on the East Coast.

When the Kingdom of England began its efforts to cross the Atlantic Ocean and settle in eastern North America in the late 16th century, it ignored the Kingdom of Spain's long-asserted claim of sovereignty over the entire continent as part of its world-wide Spanish Empire. Spain's similar claim to all of South America had been refuted when the Pope Alexander VI had divided the twin continents of the Americas between Spain and the Kingdom of Portugal in the 1494 Treaty of Tordesillas. Spain's area of settlement was limited to only the very southern and southwestern parts and coastal edges of the continent of North America, however, and it had little ability to enforce its sovereignty. Disregarding, as did Spain, the sovereignty of the indigenous nations, England claimed the entire North America continent at this point (though its western, northern, and southern boundaries were ill-defined, vague, and not yet clear), which it named Virginia in honour of the virgin queen, Elizabeth I.

England's first successful settlement in North America was Jamestown, established by the Virginia Company of London in 1607, with the second being the Atlantic Ocean archipelago of Bermuda (or the Somers Isles), added to the territory of the same company in 1612 (the company having been in occupation of the archipelago since the 1609 wreck there of its flagship, the Sea Venture). Two areas of settlement in North America had been laid out in 1606, with the name Virginia coming to connote the southern area, between Latitude 34° and Latitude 41° North, administered by the Virginia Company of London. The short form of that company's name was the London Company, but it came to be known popularly as the Virginia Company. The northern area of settlement, which extended to 45° North (an area that would come to be known as New England), was to be administered and settled by the Virginia Company of Plymouth (or Plymouth Company), which established the Popham Colony in what is now Maine in 1606, but this was quickly abandoned and Plymouth Company's territory was absorbed into the London Company's.

Over the course of the 17th century, Virginia would come to refer only to the polity that is today the Commonwealth of Virginia on the East Coast of the United States of America, with later areas of settlement on the continent considered separate colonies under their own local administrations and all collectively designated as America (less often as North America). The Kingdom of England (including the adjacent Principality of Wales) and the Kingdom of Scotland remained separate nations until their 1707 unification to form the Kingdom of Great Britain (1707–1801). Scotland's attempts to establish its own colonies in North America and Central America before 1707 had been short-lived, but England brought substantial trans-Atlantic possessions into the new union when English America became British America. In 1775, on the eve of the American Revolution and parallel. American Revolutionary War (1775–1783). British America included territories in the Western Hemisphere northeast of New Spain, apart from the islands and claims of the British West Indies in the larger West Indies islands chain in the Caribbean Sea, near the Gulf of Mexico. These were:

- Bermuda
- British Arctic Territories
- The Floridas (East and West Florida, administered separately)
- Indian Reserve
- Newfoundland
- North-Western Territory
- Nova Scotia
- Quebec
- Rupert's Land (the territory of the Hudson's Bay Company)
- St. John's Island (later Prince Edward Island)
- Thirteen Colonies (each one administered separately, soon to become the United States):
  - Connecticut Colony
  - Delaware Colony
  - Province of Georgia
  - Province of Maryland
  - Province of Massachusetts Bay
  - Province of New Hampshire
  - Province of New Jersey
  - Province of New York
  - Province of North Carolina
  - Province of Pennsylvania
  - Colony of Rhode Island and Providence Plantations
  - Province of South Carolina
  - Colony of Virginia

=== Bermuda ===
The Somers Isles, or Bermuda, had been occupied by the Virginia Company since its flagship, the Sea Venture, was wrecked there in 1609, and the archipelago was officially added to the company's territory in 1612, then managed by a spin-off, the Somers Isles Company, until 1684, but maintained close links with Virginia and Carolina Colony (which had subsequently been settled from Bermuda under William Sayle in 1670). The British Government originally grouped Bermuda with North America (the archipelago is approximately 1,035.26 km (643 mi) east-southeast of Cape Hatteras, North Carolina (with Cape Point on Hatteras Island being the nearest landfall); 1,236 km (768 mi) south of Cape Sable Island, Nova Scotia; 1,759 km (1,093 mi) northeast of Cuba, and 1,538 km (956 mi) due north of the British Virgin Islands.

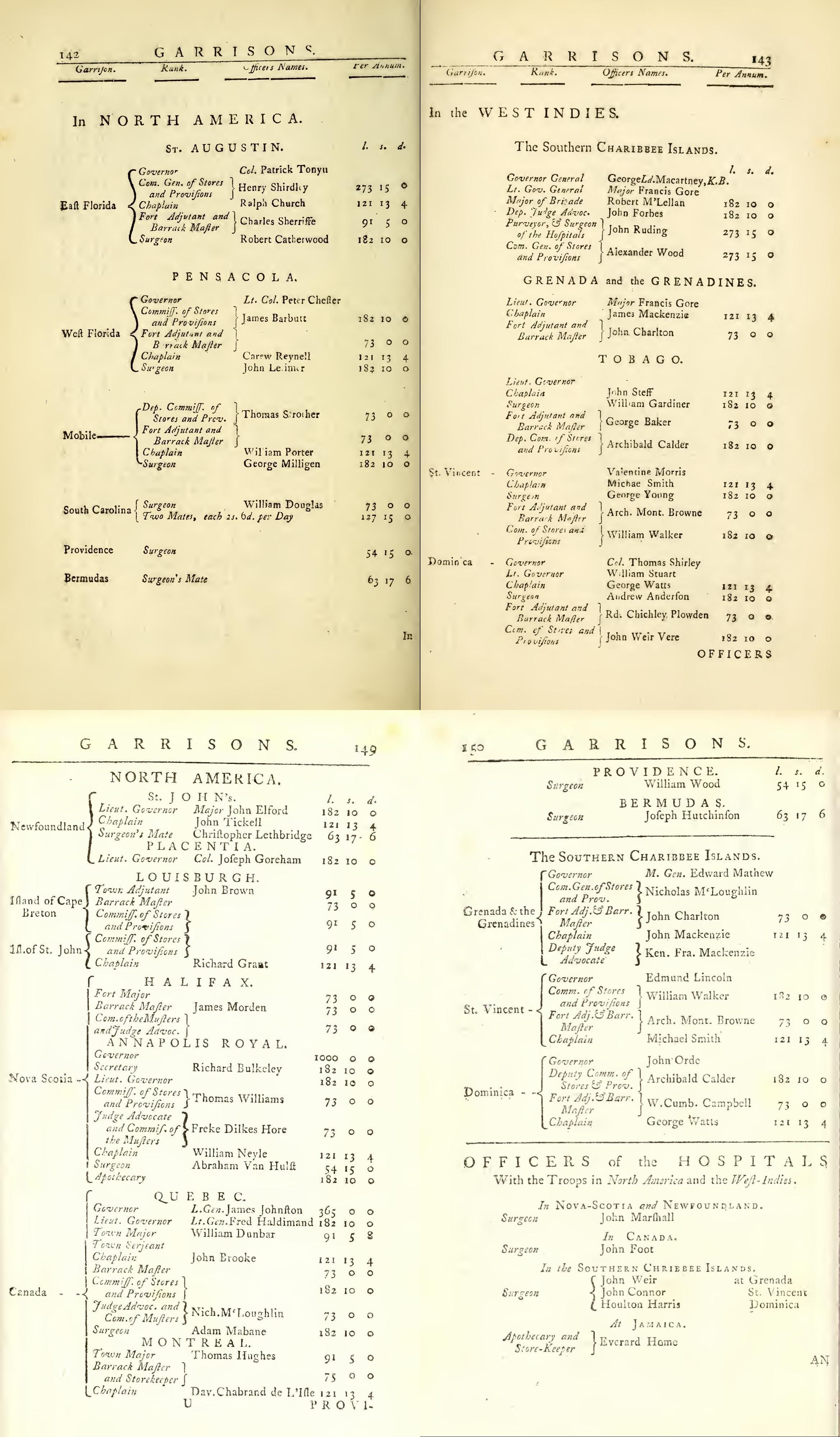
Military Governors and Staff Officers in garrisons of British North America and West Indies 1778 and 1784

Although Bermudians, with close ties of blood and trade to the southern continental American colonies (especially Virginia and South Carolina), tended towards the rebels early in the American Revolutionary War / American War of Independence (1775–1783), the control of the adjacent and surrounding Atlantic Ocean by the Royal Navy meant there was no likelihood of the colony joining the rebellion. Although the rebels were supplied with ships and gunpowder by the Bermudians, Bermudian privateers soon turned aggressively on rebel shipping. After the acknowledgement by the British Government of the independence of the former thirteen rebellious continental colonies in the negotiated Treaty of Paris of 1783, finally recognising the independence of the new United States of America which it originally declared on July 4, 1776. Bermuda was grouped regionally by the British Government with The Maritimes and Newfoundland and Labrador provinces of modern eastern Canada, and, more widely, with British North America.

Following the world-wide war, the Royal Navy spent a dozen years of peace-time charting the barrier reef around Bermuda to discover the channel that enabled access to the northern lagoon, the Great Sound, and Hamilton Harbour. Once this had been located, a base was established (initially at St. George's before the construction of the Royal Naval Dockyard, Bermuda) in 1794, when Vice-Admiral Sir George Murray, Commander-in-Chief of the new River St. Lawrence and Coast of America and North America and West Indies Station, set up the first Admiralty House, Bermuda, at Rose Hill, St. George's. In 1813, the area of command became the North America Station again, with the West Indies falling under the Jamaica Station, and in 1816 it was renamed the North America and Lakes of Canada Station. The headquarters was initially in Bermuda during the winter and Halifax during the summer (both of which were designated as Imperial fortresses, along with Gibraltar and Malta), but Bermuda, became the year-round headquarters of the Station in 1821, when the area of command became the North America and West Indies Station (with the absorption of the Newfoundland Station). The Royal Naval Dockyard, Halifax, was finally transferred to the Government of the Dominion of Canada in 1907.

Before 1784, the Bermuda Garrison had been placed under the military Commander-in-Chief America in New York during the American War of Independence. A small regular infantry garrison had existed from 1701 to 1768, alongside the militia, and part of the Royal Garrison Battalion had been stationed there in 1778 but that battalion was disbanded in Bermuda in 1784. The regular military garrison was re-established at Bermuda in 1794 by part of the British Army's 47th Regiment of Foot and the Board of Ordnance also stationed an invalid company of the Royal Artillery there soon after. The Bermuda garrison was to be part of the Nova Scotia Command until 1869 (in 1815, Lieutenant-General Sir George Prevost was Captain-General and Governor-in-Chief in and over the Provinces of Upper-Canada, Lower-Canada, Nova-Scotia, and New-Brunswick, and their several Dependencies, Vice-Admiral of the same, Lieutenant-General and Commander of all His Majesty's Forces in the said Provinces of Lower Canada and Upper-Canada, Nova-Scotia and New-Brunswick, and their several Dependencies, and in the islands of Newfoundland, Prince Edward, Cape Breton and the Bermudas. Beneath Prevost, the staff of the British Army in the Provinces of Nova-Scotia, New-Brunswick, and their Dependencies, including the Islands of Newfoundland, Cape Breton, Prince Edward and Bermuda were under the Command of Lieutenant-General Sir John Coape Sherbrooke. Below Sherbrooke, the Bermuda Garrison was under the immediate control of the lieutenant-governor of Bermuda, Major General George Horsford).), and was expanded greatly during the 19th century, both to defend the colony as a naval base and to launch amphibious operations against the Atlantic coast of the United States in any war that should transpire.

The Royal Navy, British Army, Royal Marines, and Colonial Marines forces based in Bermuda carried out actions of this sort during the subsequent American / Canadian War of 1812 (1812–1815), the North American phase of the larger Napoleonic Wars (1803–1815), elsewhere in Europe and the world, versus Napoleon Bonaparte (1769–1821), of France. When the Royal Navy's blockade of the Atlantic seaboard of the United States was orchestrated from Bermuda (In the New England region, where support for the United States Government's war against Britain was low and from which Britain continued to purchase and receive grain to feed its army engaged in the Peninsular War in Spain and Portugal, was at first excluded from this blockade). In 1813, Lieutenant-Colonel, Sir Thomas Sydney Beckwith arrived in Bermuda to command an expeditionary force tasked with raiding the Atlantic Seaboard of the United States, specifically in the region of the Chesapeake Bay and surrounding coasts of Maryland and Virginia. The force was to be composed of the infantry battalion then on garrison duty in Bermuda, the 102nd Regiment of Foot (with its Commanding Officer, Lieutenant-Colonel Charles James Napier as Second-in-Command) forming one brigade with Royal Marines and a unit recruited from French prisoners-of-war, which was under Lt. Col. Napier's command, and another brigade formed under Lieutenant-Colonel Williams of the Royal Marines. The force took part in the Battle of Craney Island on 22 June 1813. The most famous action carried out during the war by forces from Bermuda was the Chesapeake Campaign of 1813 and later 1814, including the Battle of Bladensburg northeast outside Washington, D.C. with the subsequent Burning of Washington in August 1814, retribution for the "wanton destruction of private property along the north shores of Lake Erie" by American forces under Col. John Campbell in May 1814, the most notable being the Raid on Port Dover to draw United States forces away from the Canadian border. In 1828, His Excellency George, Earl of Dalhousie, (Baron Dalhousie, of Dalhousie Castle,) Knight Grand Cross of the Most Honourable Military Order of the Bath was Captain General and Governor in Chief in and over the Provinces of Lower-Canada, Upper-Canada, Nova-Scotia, and New-Brunswick, and their several dependencies, Vice-Admiral of the same, Lieutenant-General and Commander of all His Majesty's Forces in the said Provinces, and their several dependencies, and in the Islands of Newfoundland, Prince Edward, and Bermuda, &c. &c c. &c. Beneath Dalhousie, the Provinces of Nova-Scotia, New-Brunswick, and their Dependencies, including the Island of Newfoundland, Cape Breton, Prince Edward and Bermuda were under the Command of His Excellency Lieutenant-General Sir James Kempt GCB, GCH.

The established Church of England in Bermuda (since 1978, titled the Anglican Church of Bermuda) and Newfoundland was attached to the See of Nova Scotia from 1825 to 1839 and from 1787 to 1839, respectively. From 1839, the island of Newfoundland and the coast of Labrador, as well as Bermuda, became parts of the Diocese of Newfoundland and Bermuda, with the shared Bishop (Aubrey George Spencer being the first) alternating his residence between the two colonies. A separate Bermuda Synod was incorporated in 1879, but continued to share its Bishop with Newfoundland until 1919, when the separate position of Bishop of Bermuda was created (in 1949, on Newfoundland becoming a province of Canada, the Diocese of Newfoundland became part of the Anglican Church of Canada; the Church of England in Bermuda, which was re-titled the Anglican Church of Bermuda in 1978, is today one of six extra-provincial Anglican churches within the Church of England overseen by the Archbishop of Canterbury in Canterbury, England).

Other denominations also at one time included Bermuda with Nova Scotia or Canada. Following the separation of the Church of England from the Roman Catholic Church in the 16th century of the English Reformation period, Catholic worship was restricted in England (subsequently Britain) and its colonies, including Bermuda, until the Roman Catholic Relief Act 1791, and operated thereafter under restrictions until Catholic emancipation relief bills in the 19th and 20th century. Once Roman Catholic worship was allowed and reestablished, Bermuda formed part of the Archdiocese of Halifax, Nova Scotia, until 1953, when it was separated to become the Apostolic Prefecture of Bermuda Islands. The congregation of the first African Methodist Episcopal Church in Bermuda (St. John African Methodist Episcopal Church, erected in 1885 in Hamilton Parish) had previously been part of the British Methodist Episcopal Church of Canada.

=== New France (Nouvelle-France) ===
The Kingdom of Great Britain acquired most of Acadia or Acadie, Nouvelle-France, in connection with the Queen Anne's War of 1702–1713, and subsequent lands later, after the Seven Years' War / French and Indian War (1753/1756-1763). These territories would become the future provinces of Nova Scotia, New Brunswick, and Prince Edward Island, as well as parts of Quebec in the modern Dominion of Canada and additional territories that would eventually form part of the old Massachusetts Bay Colony, later after 1776 as the Commonwealth of Massachusetts, and later separated to form the State of Maine in 1820, in the United States.

Britain acquired much of the remainder of Canada (New France) and the eastern half of Louisiana, including West Florida, from the Kingdom of France, and East Florida from the Kingdom of Spain, by the earlier 1763 Treaty of Paris (1763), which ended the Seven Years' War (in Europe) / French and Indian War (in North America). Spain had not taken possession of any of Spanish Louisiana, which had been ceded to it under the earlier secret Treaty of Fontainebleau of 1762, from France of French Louisiana until seven years later in 1769. By the terms of the later Treaty of Paris (1783), the United States acquired the southern and western portions of the former Royal French colony in the interior of the North American continent of New France / (later Quebec), south of the Great Lakes to the Ohio River and west to the Mississippi River. At the same time that Spain gained along the Gulf of Mexico coastline of West Florida (western panhandle of Florida) and regained again East Florida (of the Florida peninsula), forming Spanish Florida until its 1813 / 1819 cession to the adjacent United States.

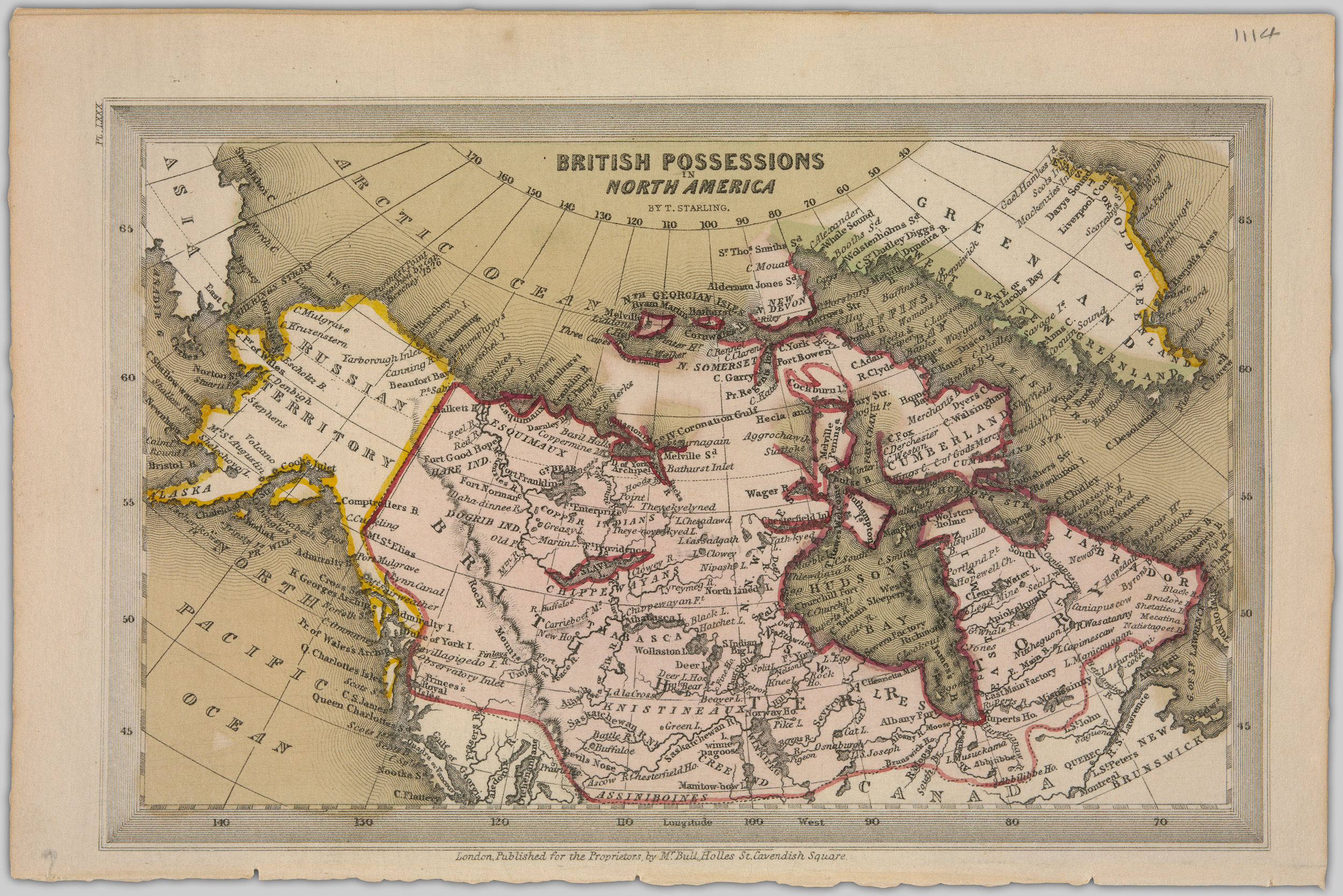
British possessions on the North American continent.c. 1830

Nova Scotia was split into modern-day Nova Scotia and New Brunswick in 1784. The part of Quebec retained after 1783 was split into the primarily French-speaking Province of Lower Canada (future Quebec) and the primarily English-speaking Province of Upper Canada (future Ontario) in 1791. Later the two provinces north of the Great Lakes of the British Empire were combined in 1841 as the Province of Canada (also known as the United Provinces of Canada or the United Canada). This lasted a quarter-century until 1867 and the passage of the British North America Act by the British Parliament in London, with the then establishment of the modern Dominion of Canada.

After the War of 1812 (1812–1815), the Treaty of 1818 established the east/west 49th parallel, north of latitude as the United States–British North America international border, extending from Rupert's Land (north of the Great Lakes) further west to the edge of the Rocky Mountains. Then 28 years later, in the subsequent 1846 treaty, Britain and the United States split the jointly-administered Oregon Country lands of the Pacific Northwest region between the Americans and the British, extending the 49th parallel line further west to the Puget Sound. The United States was assigned lands south of the 49th parallel, but Britain retained all of the off-shore of the West Coast of Vancouver Island (including a small portion of the southern tip of Vancouver Island south of the 49th parallel).

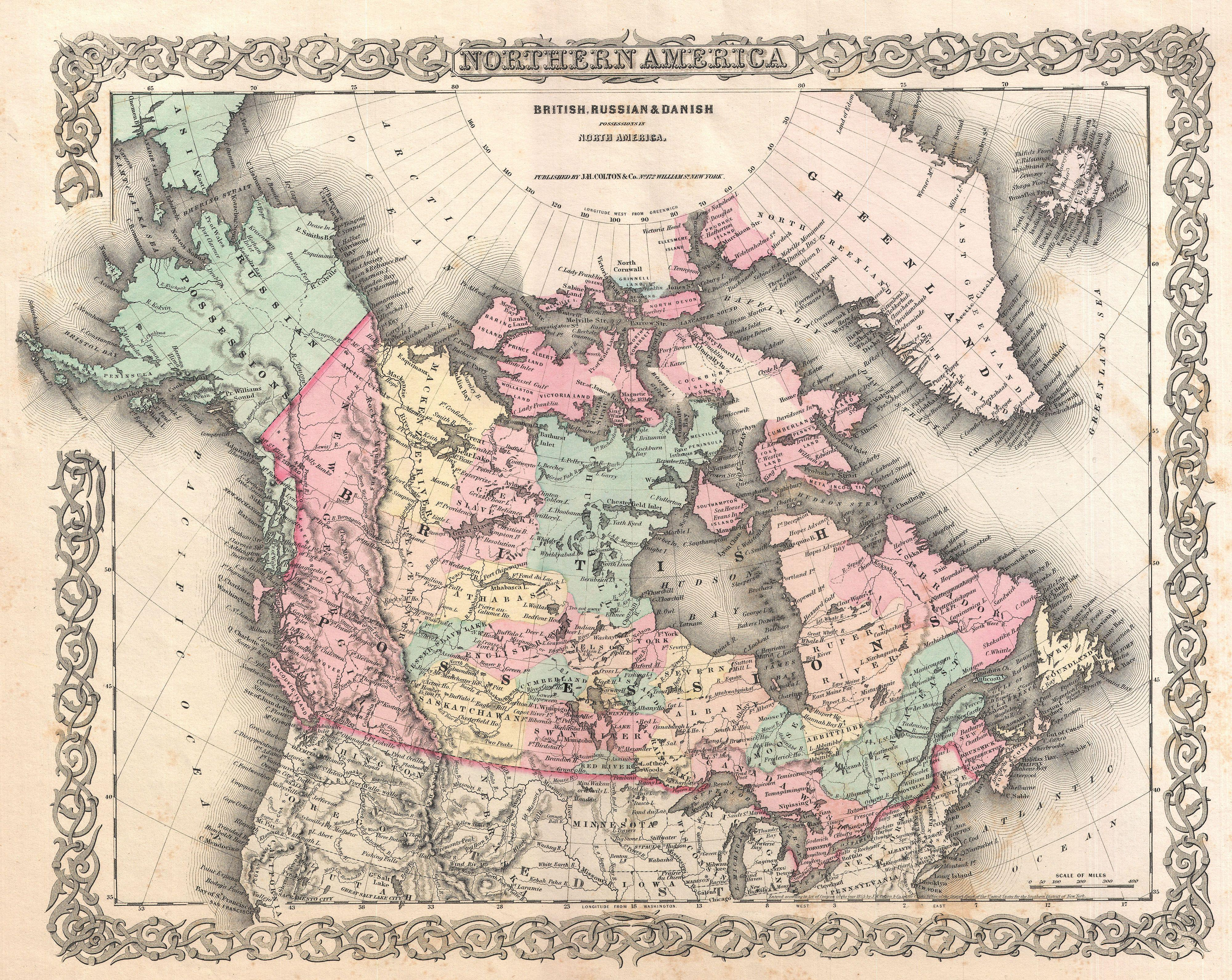
British possessions in North America, (ca. 1855)

After threats and squabbles over rich timber lands, the boundary between Maine and Nova Scotia was clarified by the Webster–Ashburton Treaty of 1842, negotiated by Daniel Webster and Lord Ashburton.

The Canadas were united into the Province of Canada in 1841.

On 1 July 1867, the Dominion of Canada was created by the British North America Act, 1867. The confederation process brought together the provinces of Canada, New Brunswick, and Nova Scotia. The former Province of Canada was split back into its two parts, with Canada East (Lower Canada) being renamed Quebec, and Canada West (Upper Canada) renamed Ontario.

Following confederation in 1867, the British Army withdrew from Canada in 1871, handing military defence over to the Canadian Militia. With the consequent abolition of the British Army's Nova Scotia Command, and the office of its Commander-in-Chief for British North America, the still-growing Bermuda Garrison was elevated to a separate. Bermuda Command

=== Newfoundland, Rupert's Land, and other territories of British North America ===
The Colony of Newfoundland, like Bermuda, was not included in the confederation that unified the other British North American colonies to form the Dominion of Canada in 1867.

In 1870, Rupert's Land, which consisted of territories of the Hudson's Bay Company, was annexed to Canada as the North-West Territories (NWT) and the new province of Manitoba. British Columbia, the British colony on the west coast north of the 49th parallel, including all of Vancouver Island, joined as Canada's sixth province in 1871, and Prince Edward Island joined as the seventh in 1873. The boundary of British Columbia with Washington Territory was settled by arbitration in 1872, and with Alaska by arbitration in 1903.

The Arctic Archipelago was ceded by Britain to Canada in 1880 and added to the North-West Territories. Later on, large sections of the NWT were split off as new territories (the Yukon Territory in 1898 and Nunavut in 1999), or provinces (Alberta and Saskatchewan, both in 1905), or were added to existing provinces (Manitoba, Ontario, and Quebec, in stages ending in 1912).

In 1907, Newfoundland became the Dominion of Newfoundland, leaving Bermuda as the sole remaining colony in British North America. British North America ceased to exist as an administrative region of the British Empire, with all remaining British colonies in the Western Hemisphere, from Bermuda to the Falkland Islands grouped in the "West Indian Division" of the "Crown Colonies Department" of the Colonial Office.

In 1934, Newfoundland returned to British administration under the Commission of Government. Bermuda was increasingly perceived by the British Government as in, or at least grouped for convenience with, the British West Indies. The last official administrative link to the Maritimes was through the established church. In 1879 the Synod of the Church of England in Bermuda was formed and a Diocese of Bermuda became separate from the Diocese of Newfoundland, but continued to be grouped under the Bishop of Newfoundland and Bermuda until 1919, when Newfoundland and Bermuda each received its own bishop.

In 1949, the island of Newfoundland, and its associated mainland territory of Labrador, joined Canada as the tenth province.

Canada became semi-independent beginning in 1867, and fully sovereign on foreign affairs beginning with the Statute of Westminster 1931. Canada gained the right to establish and accept foreign embassies, with the first one being in Washington, D.C.

The last vestiges of Canada's constitutional dependency upon Britain were eliminated when Canadians from various provinces agreed on an internal procedure for amending the Canadian Constitution. This agreement was implemented when the British Parliament passed the Canada Act 1982 at the request of the Senate and House of Commons of Canada, with the support of nine of the ten provinces of Canada.

== British North America colonies ==
Following the 1776 declaration of independence of the colonies that were to form the United States (which was to be recognised by the British Government in 1783), the areas that remained under British sovereignty were administered by the Home Office, which had been formed on 27 March 1782, and which also controlled the military until this was transferred to the War Office in 1794. The Home Office referred to the remaining North American continental colonies and the archipelago of Bermuda (located 640 miles (1,030 km) off North Carolina) as British North America and their administration was increasingly linked. In 1801, administration of the colonies was moved from the Home Office to the War Office (which became the War and Colonial Office), with the Secretary of State for War thus becoming the Secretary of State for War and the Colonies until 1854, when the War and Colonial Office was split into the War Office (under the Secretary of State for War) and the Colonial Office (under the Secretary of State for the Colonies).

Prior to the signing of the 1846 Oregon Treaty, the North American continental colonies were as follows:

- Province of Canada — (previously Upper Canada and Lower Canada)
- Newfoundland
- Nova Scotia
- New Brunswick
- Prince Edward Island
- Rupert's Land
- British Arctic Territories
- Columbia District/Oregon Country (shared with the United States)

The North Atlantic oceanic archipelago of Bermuda, not strictly part of the Americas at all, was also included as its nearest neighbour (after the United States) is Nova Scotia.

== Administration ==
Besides the local colonial governments in each colony, British North America was administered directly via London.

Other than the territory administered by the Honourable East India Company and protectorates, the British Empire, including British North America (but not including the territory administered by the Hudson's Bay Company), was administered until 1783 by the Board of Trade, from 1783 through 1801 by the Home Office and by the Home Secretary, then from 1801 to 1854 by the War Office (which became the War and Colonial Office) and Secretary of State for War and Colonies (as the Secretary of State for War was renamed). From 1824, the British Empire was divided by the War and Colonial Office into four administrative departments, including NORTH AMERICA, the WEST INDIES, MEDITERRANEAN AND AFRICA, and EASTERN COLONIES, of which North America included:

North America

- Upper Canada, Lower Canada
- New Brunswick, Nova Scotia, Prince Edward Island
- Bermuda, Newfoundland

Until 1846, the postal system had a deputy based in British North America, with administration from London.

The Colonial Office and War Office, and the Secretary of State for the Colonies and the Secretary of State for War, were separated in 1854. The War Office, from then, until the 1867 confederation of the Dominion of Canada, split the military administration of the British colonial and foreign stations into nine districts: North America And North Atlantic; West Indies; Mediterranean; West Coast Of Africa And South Atlantic; South Africa; Egypt And The Sudan; INDIAN OCEAN; Australia; and China. North America And North Atlantic included the following stations (or garrisons):

North America and North Atlantic

- New Westminster (British Columbia)
- Newfoundland
- Quebec
- Halifax
- Kingston, Canada West
- Bermuda

The Colonial Office, by 1862, oversaw eight Colonies in British North America, including:

North American Colonies, 1862

- Canada
- Nova Scotia
- New Brunswick
- Prince Edward Island
- Newfoundland
- Bermuda
- Vancouver Island
- British Columbia

By 1867, administration of the South Atlantic Ocean archipelago of the Falkland Islands, which had been colonised in 1833, had been added to the remit of the North American Department of the Colonial Office.

North American Department of the Colonial Office, 1867

- Canada
- Nova Scotia
- New Brunswick
- Prince Edward Island
- Newfoundland
- Bermuda
- Vancouver Island
- British Columbia
- Falkland Islands

Following the 1867 confederation of most of the British North American colonies to form the Dominion of Canada, Bermuda and Newfoundland remained as the only British colonies in North America (although the Falkland Islands also continued to be administered by the North American Department of the Colonial Office). Although the British Government was no longer responsible for Canada, its relationship with Canada and subsequent dominions would continue to be overseen by the Secretary of State for the Colonies (who headed the Colonial Office) until the creation of the Secretary of State for Dominion Affairs (a position initially held in common with the Secretary of State for the Colonies) in 1925. The reduction of the territory administered by the British Government would result in re-organisation of the Colonial Office. In 1901, the departments of the Colonial Office included: North American and Australasian; West Indian; Eastern; South African; and West African (two departments).

Of these, the "North American and Australasian Department" included:

North American and Australasian Department, 1901

- Canada
- Newfoundland
- Bermuda
- Bahamas
- British Honduras
- New South Wales
- Victoria
- South Australia
- Queensland
- Western Australia
- Tasmania, New Zealand
- Fiji
- British New Guinea
- Western Pacific
- Cyprus
- Gibraltar
- Falkland Islands.

In 1907, the Colony of Newfoundland became the Dominion of Newfoundland, leaving the Imperial fortress of Bermuda as the sole remaining British North American colony.

Bermuda, with a land mass totalling less than 21 square miles and a population of 17,535, could hardly constitute an Imperial administrative region on its own. By 1908, the Colonial Office included two departments (one overseeing dominion and protectorate business, the other colonial): Dominions Department (Canada, Australia, New Zealand, Cape of Good Hope, Natal, Newfoundland, Transvaal, Orange River Colony, Australian States, Fiji, Western Pacific, Basutoland, Bechuanaland Protectorate, Swaziland, Rhodesia); Crown Colonies Department. The Crown Colonies Department was made up of four territorial divisions: Eastern Division; West Indian Division; East African and Mediterranean Division; and the West African Division.

Of these, the West Indian Division now included all of the remaining British colonies in the Western Hemisphere, from Bermuda to the Falkland Islands:

Jamaica, Turks Islands, British Honduras, British Guiana, Bahamas, Bermuda, Trinidad, Barbados, Windward Islands, Leeward Islands, Falkland Islands, and St. Helena.

== See also ==
- Atlantic history
- British America
- British West Indies
- British North America Acts
- British colonization of the Americas
- Canada under British rule
- Colonial government in the Thirteen Colonies
- Colonial history of the United States
- Economic history of the United States#Colonial economy
- Former colonies and territories in Canada
- Historiography of the British Empire, with long bibliography
- History of Canada
- New England Colonies

== Sources ==
- Cruikshank, Ernest A. (1964). "The County of Norfolk in the War of 1812". In Zaslow, Morris (ed.). The Defended Border: Upper Canada and the War of 1812. Macmillan of Canada. OCLC 480289.
- Cruikshank, Ernest (2006) [1814]. The Documentary History of the campaign upon the Niagara frontier. (Part 1-2). University of Calgary. Archived from the original on May 27, 2011.
- Maton, William F. (8 December 1995). "Prince Edward Island Terms of Union". Solon.org.
- Maton, William F (1998). "British Columbia Terms of Union". The Solon Law Archive.
