= British Arctic Territories =

Former British territory

- 1576–1 September 1880
- Flag
- Status: Former territory of the British Empire
- Government: Colonial administration by the United Kingdom government

Establishment
- Historical era: Age of Discovery
  - Expeditions of Martin Frobisher: 1576, 1577, 1578
  - English territorial claim: 1576
  - Transfer to Canada: Adjacent Territories Order, 31 July, 1880
  - Disestablished: 1 September 1880
Succeeded by
Canada
- Today part of: Nunavut and the Northwest Territories, Canada

The British Arctic Territories, as defined in 1880, were assumed British territories and possessions in or adjacent to North America and adjacent islands that were not part of Canada or the Colony of Newfoundland. They are now known as the Arctic Archipelago.

The British claim to this land, mainly various islands, was based on the discoveries of Martin Frobisher (1535–1594) in the 16th century. The British government annexed to Canada in 1880 by means of an imperial order in council, the Adjacent Territories Order, under the royal prerogative. That Order was made due to the United States' interest in the area, specifically in relation to the Monroe Doctrine.

Britain had in 1870 transferred most of its remaining land in North America, which was the North-Western Territory and Rupert's Land, to Canada, and it became the Canadian North-West Territories, spelled the Northwest Territories from 1906.

On 1 April 1999, the territory of Nunavut was created from the eastern portion of the Northwest Territories. Most of the islands became part of Nunavut. Islands split between Nunavut and the Northwest Territories include Victoria Island, Melville Island, Mackenzie King Island, and Borden Island.

The islands were never part of Rupert's Land (Hudson Bay drainage basin) or the North-Western Territory (the mainland north and west of Rupert's Land), and both of those trade monopolies were managed by the Hudson's Bay Company. Canada had acquired those regions in 1870 and created the new Province of Manitoba, originally a square 18 times less its current size, as well as the new Northwest Territories, which by 1999 had ceded land to create today's Yukon and Nunavut Territories and the Provinces of Saskatchewan and Alberta, and ceded land to existing provinces' expansions into northern Ontario, northern Quebec, all of Manitoba, and the northeastern tip of British Columbia.

== British Arctic Territory flag hoax ==
Flags of the World has a tradition of posting a new flag for the British Arctic Territory every 1 April. It has led to some persistent misinformation on the web.

== See also ==
- Northern Canada
- Northwest Passage
