= Section 92A of the Constitution Act, 1867 =

Provision of the Constitution of Canada

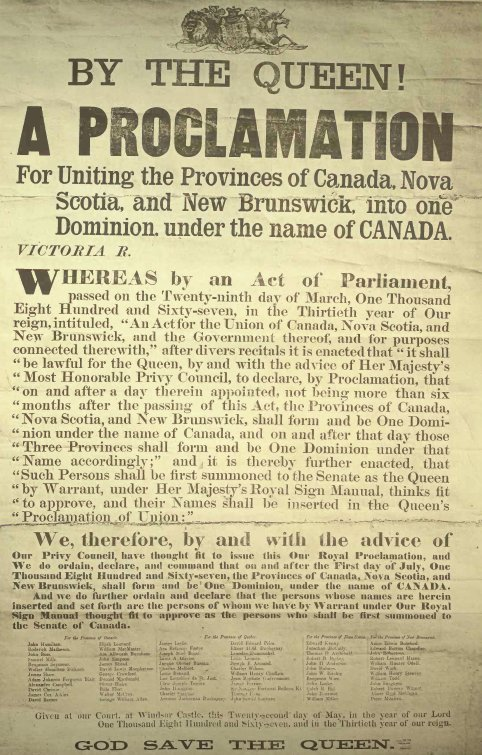
Proclamation bringing the Constitution Act into force, July 1, 1867

Section 92A of the Constitution Act, 1867 (French: article 92A de la Loi constitutionnelle de 1867) is a provision of the Constitution of Canada relating to provincial jurisdiction over natural resources. It was added to the Constitution Act, 1867 in 1982, as part of the Patriation of the Constitution.

The Constitution Act, 1867 is the constitutional statute which established Canada. Originally named the British North America Act, 1867, the Act continues to be the foundational statute for the Constitution of Canada, although it has been amended many times since 1867. It is now recognised as part of the supreme law of Canada.

== Constitution Act, 1867 ==
The Constitution Act, 1867 is part of the Constitution of Canada and thus part of the supreme law of Canada. It was the product of extensive negotiations by the governments of the British North American provinces in the 1860s. The Act sets out the constitutional framework of Canada, including the structure of the federal government and the powers of the federal government and the provinces. Originally enacted in 1867 by the British Parliament under the name the British North America Act, 1867, in 1982 the Act was brought under full Canadian control through the Patriation of the Constitution, and was renamed the Constitution Act, 1867. Since Patriation, the Act can only be amended in Canada, under the amending formula set out in the Constitution Act, 1982.

== Text of section 92A ==
Section 92A reads:

Laws respecting non-renewable natural resources, forestry resources and electrical energy
92A (1) In each province, the legislature may exclusively make laws in relation to

(a) exploration for non-renewable natural resources in the province;

(b) development, conservation and management of non-renewable natural resources and forestry resources in the province, including laws in relation to the rate of primary production therefrom; and

(c) development, conservation and management of sites and facilities in the province for the generation and production of electrical energy.

Export from provinces of resources
(2) In each province, the legislature may make laws in relation to the export from the province to another part of Canada of the primary production from non-renewable natural resources and forestry resources in the province and the production from facilities in the province for the generation of electrical energy, but such laws may not authorize or provide for discrimination in prices or in supplies exported to another part of Canada.

Authority of Parliament
(3) Nothing in subsection (2) derogates from the authority of Parliament to enact laws in relation to the matters referred to in that subsection and, where such a law of Parliament and a law of a province conflict, the law of Parliament prevails to the extent of the conflict.

Taxation of resources
(4) In each province, the legislature may make laws in relation to the raising of money by any mode or system of taxation in respect of

(a) non-renewable natural resources and forestry resources in the province and the primary production therefrom, and (b) sites and facilities in the province for the generation of electrical energy and the production therefrom,

whether or not such production is exported in whole or in part from the province, but such laws may not authorize or provide for taxation that differentiates between production exported to another part of Canada and production not exported from the province.

Primary production
(5) The expression primary production has the meaning assigned by the Sixth Schedule.

Existing powers or rights
(6) Nothing in subsections (1) to (5) derogates from any powers or rights that a legislature or government of a province had immediately before the coming into force of this section.

Section 92A is found in Part VI of the Constitution Act, 1867, dealing with the distribution of legislative powers. It was added to the Constitution Act, 1867 by the Constitution Act, 1982, and has not been amended since its enactment.

== Purpose and interpretation ==
Section 92A was added to the Constitution Act, 1867 at the insistence of the provinces of Saskatchewan and Alberta, as part of the Patriation agreement in 1982. The provision was in response to two decisions of the Supreme Court of Canada in the 1970s, which limited the ability of the provinces to regulate the use of their natural resources. Section 92A was enacted by the Constitution Act, 1982 as an amendment to the Constitution Act, 1867.

== Sixth Schedule: Text ==
The term "primary production" used in s. 92A is defined by the Sixth Schedule to the Constitution Act, 1867. It reads as follows:

THE SIXTH SCHEDULE

Primary Production from Non-Renewable Natural Resources and Forestry Resources
1. For the purposes of section 92A of this Act,

(a) production from a non-renewable natural resource is primary production therefrom if

(i) it is in the form in which it exists uponits recovery or severance from its natural state, or
(ii) it is a product resulting from processing or refining the resource, and is not a manufactured product or a product resulting from refining crude oil, refining upgraded heavy crude oil, refining gases or liquids derived from coal or refining a synthetic equivalent of crude oil; and

(b) production from a forestry resource is primary production therefrom if it consists of sawlogs, poles, lumber, wood chips, sawdust or any other primary wood product, or wood pulp, and is not a product manufactured from wood.

Like section 92A, the Sixth Schedule was added as an amendment in 1982.
