= List of Canadian territorial senators =

This is a list of past and present members of the Senate of Canada representing the territories of Yukon, Nunavut and the Northwest Territories. The territories are currently represented by one senator each.

Parliament has the power to provide for the representation of territories in the Senate by virtue of section 1 of the Constitution Act, 1886 and section 44 of the Constitution Act, 1982.

The Northwest Territories was granted two Senate seats in 1888 and doubled to four seats in 1903. After Alberta and Saskatchewan were created in 1905, the territories would not have Senate representation until the enactment of the Constitution Act, 1975 (No 2), which gave one seat to the Northwest Territories and one seat to the Yukon. Nunavut was granted one seat upon its creation in 1999 by virtue of the Constitution Act, 1999 (Nunavut).

The Constitution Act, 1975 (No 2) and now the Constitution Act, 1999 (Nunavut) adapt the qualifications under section 23 of the Constitution Act, 1867 for those representing the territories so that they could fulfill their real property requirement and be resident in their territory. Nunavut Senator Dennis Patterson has proposed the repeal of the real property qualification with the aim of increasing the number of residents of Nunavut qualified to be summoned to the Senate by the Governor General.

== Current ==
Name	Party	Division	Date appointed	Appointed by	Mandatory retirement
Pat Duncan	Independent Senators Group	Yukon	December 12, 2018	Trudeau, J.	April 8, 2035
Nancy Karetak-Lindell	Non-affiliated	Nunavut	December 19, 2024	Trudeau, J.	December 10, 2032
Margaret Dawn Anderson	Conservative	Northwest Territories	December 12, 2018	Trudeau, J.	April 14, 2042

== Historic ==
=== Northwest Territories ===
The Northwest Territories had representation in the Senate from 1888 to 1905. After the creation of Alberta and Saskatchewan in 1905, however, the territories were not represented in the Senate until 1975.

Name	Party	Division	Date appointed	Appointed by	End of term
Margaret Dawn Anderson	Progressive Senate Group	Northwest Territories	December 12, 2018	J. Trudeau	Incumbent
Nick Sibbeston	Liberal	Northwest Territories	September 2, 1999	Chrétien	November 21, 2017
Willie Adams	Liberal	Northwest Territories (Note: Appointed as senator for the NWT, Adams represented Nunavut after division until his retirement in 2009)	April 5, 1977	P.E. Trudeau	March 31, 1999
Thomas Osborne Davis	Liberal	Prince Albert, NWT (Note: Appointed as senator for the NWT, Davis represented Prince Albert, Saskatchewan after the province's creation, until his death, January 23, 1917)	September 30, 1904	Laurier	August 31, 1905
James Hamilton Ross	Liberal	Regina, NWT (Note: Appointed as senator for the NWT, Ross represented Regina, Saskatchewan after the province's creation, until his death, December 14, 1932)	September 30, 1904	Laurier	August 31, 1905
James Alexander Lougheed	Conservative	Calgary, NWT (Note: Appointed as senator for the NWT, Lougheed represented Calgary, Alberta after the province's creation, until his death, November 22, 1925)	December 10, 1889	Macdonald	August 31, 1905
William Dell Perley	Conservative	Wolseley, NWT (Note: Appointed as senator for the NWT, Perley represented Wolseley, Saskatchewan after the province's creation, until his death, July 15, 1909)	August 3, 1888	Macdonald	August 31, 1905
Richard Hardisty	Conservative	Edmonton, NWT	February 23, 1888	Macdonald	October 18, 1889 (Note: Died in office)

=== Yukon ===
The first senator for Yukon was appointed in 1975.

Name	Party	Division	Date appointed	Appointed by	End of term
Pat Duncan	Independent Senators Group	Yukon	December 12, 2018	J. Trudeau	Incumbent
Daniel Lang	Conservative	Yukon	January 2, 2009	Harper	August 15, 2017
Ione Christensen	Liberal	Yukon	September 2, 1999	Chrétien	December 31, 2006 (Note: Retired)
Paul Lucier	Liberal	Yukon	October 23, 1975	P.E. Trudeau	July 23, 1999

=== Nunavut ===
The first senator for Nunavut was appointed in 1999.

Name	Party	Division	Date appointed	Appointed by	End of term
Nancy Karetak-Lindell	Non-affiliated	Nunavut	December 19, 2024	J. Trudeau	Incumbent
Dennis Patterson	Conservative	Nunavut	August 27, 2009	Harper	December 29, 2023
Willie Adams	Liberal	Nunavut	April 1, 1999	Chrétien	June 22, 2009

== See also ==
- Lists of members of the Senate of Canada
- Constitution Act, 1886
- Constitution Act, 1975 (No 1)
- Constitution Act, 1975 (No 2)
- Constitution Act, 1999 (Nunavut)
