= Constitution Act, 1999 (Nunavut) =

Act of the Parliament of Canada

The Constitution Act, 1999 (Nunavut) is an Act of the Parliament of Canada that is part of the Constitution of Canada. The Constitution Act, 1999 (Nunavut) was enacted as sections 43-47 of Part II of An Act to amend the Nunavut Act and the Constitution Act, 1867 and came into force on April 1, 1999.

The Constitution Act, 1999 (Nunavut) provides for the representation in the Senate and the House of Commons of the Northwest Territories, Nunavut and Yukon. Subsection 43(3) provides that each territory is represented in the Senate by one member. Section 46 enacts subsection 51(2) of the Constitution Act, 1867, which provides that each territory is represented in the House of Commons by one member.

The Constitution Act, 1999 (Nunavut) was enacted under the Constitution Act, 1886 and section 44 of the Constitution Act, 1982.

The Constitution Act, 1999 (Nunavut) should not be confused with the Nunavut Act, which established Nunavut as a separate territory in the eastern part of the Northwest Territories.

== See also ==
- List of Canadian territorial senators
- Constitution Act, 1886
- Constitution Act, 1975 (No 1)
- Constitution Act, 1975 (No 2)
- Constitution Act, 1982
