= Adjacent Territories Order =

Part of the Constitution of Canada adding territory

Adjacent Territories Order Décret en conseil sur les territoires adjacents

Part of the Constitution of Canada
- Citation: RSC 1985, App. II, No. 14
- Territorial extent: British Arctic Territories; Canada
- Considered by: Cabinet of Canada; Senate of Canada; House of Commons of Canada
- Enacted by: Queen-in-Council (UK)
- Enacted: July 31, 1880
- Assented to by: Victoria
- Commenced: September 1, 1880
- Authorizing legislation: Royal prerogative
- Status: Current legislation

The Adjacent Territories Order (French: Décret en conseil sur les territoires) is one of the enactments which make up the Constitution of Canada. It was issued by the British government on July 31, 1880, with the agreement of the government of Canada, to transfer the ownership of most of the remaining lands in British North America (British Arctic Territories) to Canada, effective September 1, 1880. This excluded the Newfoundland Colony, which joined Canada in March 1949.

The lands transferred were assigned to the North-West Territories and consolidated the Arctic region with land ceded from the Hudson's Bay Company (North-Western Territory and Rupert's Land).
