= Constitution Act, 1886 =

Part of the Constitution of Canada

British North America Act 1886 (Note: Section 3.)
- Act of Parliament
- Parliament of the United Kingdom
- Long title: An Act respecting the Representation in the Parliament of Canada of territories which for the time being form part of the Dominion of Canada, but are not included in any province.
- Citation: 49 & 50 Vict. c. 35
- Territorial extent: United Kingdom; Canada

Dates
- Royal assent: 25 June 1886
- Commencement: 25 June 1886 (Note: The Acts of Parliament (Commencement) Act 1793.)

Status: Current legislation

Text of statute as originally enacted

Revised text of statute as amended

Text of the Constitution Act, 1886 as in force today (including any amendments) within the United Kingdom, from legislation.gov.uk.

The Constitution Act, 1886 (49 & 50 Vict. c. 35 (UK)) is an act of the Parliament of the United Kingdom that forms part of the Constitution of Canada.

The Constitution Act, 1886 empowers the Parliament of Canada to provide for the representation of territories in the Senate and the House of Commons. Parliament used its authority under the Constitution Act, 1886 to provide that the Northwest Territories, Nunavut and Yukon would be represented by one member each in the Senate and House of Commons.

== Provisions ==
WHEREAS it is expedient to empower the Parliament of Canada to provide for the representation in the Senate and House of Commons of Canada, or either of them, of any territory which for the time being forms part of the Dominion of Canada, but is not included in any province:

[Enacting clause omitted]

1. The Parliament of Canada may from time to time make provision for the representation in the Senate and House of Commons of Canada, or in either of them, of any territories which for the time being form part of the Dominion of Canada, but are not included in any province thereof.

Section 1 of the Constitution Act, 1886 gives Parliament legislative authority to provide for the representation of a territory in the Senate and the House of Commons. Unlike a province, a territory can be represented in either the Senate or the House of Commons or both.

2. Any Act passed by the Parliament of Canada before the passing of [the Constitution Act, 1886] for the purpose mentioned in [the Constitution Act, 1886] shall, if not disallowed by the Queen, be, and shall be deemed to have been, valid and effectual from the date at which it received the assent, in Her Majesty's name, of the Governor-General of Canada. It is hereby declared that any Act passed by the Parliament of Canada, whether before or after the passing of [the Constitution Act, 1886], for the purpose mentioned in [the Constitution Act, 1886] or in the Constitution Act, 1871, has effect, notwithstanding anything in the Constitution Act, 1867, and the number of Senators or the number of Members of the House of Commons specified in the [Constitution Act, 1867] is increased by the number of Senators or of Members, as the case may be, provided by any such Act of the Parliament of Canada for the representation of any provinces or territories of Canada.

Section 2 of the Constitution Act, 1886 has several effects. Section 2 retroactively validates an 1886 Act of the Parliament of Canada providing for the representation of the Northwest Territories in the House of Commons. Section 2 clarifies that Parliament can, by providing for the representation of the territories in the Senate, increase the normal and maximum total number of Senators under the Constitution Act, 1867, and, by providing for the representation of the territories in the House of Commons, increase the number of members of the House of Commons. Section 2 also clarifies that the Parliament of Canada can do the same by providing for the representation of new provinces in the Senate and House of Commons under s 2 of the Constitution Act, 1871, as it did for Manitoba in 1870 and Alberta and Saskatchewan in 1905. Section 2 also ensures that the residence and property qualifications under section 23 of the Constitution Act, 1867 can be adapted for Senators representing territories.

3. This Act may be cited as the Constitution Act, 1886.

Section 3 of the Constitution Act, 1886 provides its short title. The original version of section 3 provided that the Act would be "construed together" with what is now the Constitution Act, 1867 and Constitution Act, 1871.

== History ==
The growing non-Indigenous population of the Northwest Territories led to calls for its representation in the Senate and the House of Commons in the 1870s and 1880s.

Although section 146 of the Constitution Act, 1867 contemplated the admission of Rupert's Land and the North-western Territory to Canada, it did not provide for the territories' representation in the Senate the way section 147 did for Prince Edward Island and Newfoundland. Similarly, the Constitution Act, 1871 empowered Parliament to provide for the representation of certain new provinces in the Senate and the House of Commons, but not of territories.

The Constitution Act, 1886 was enacted at the request of the government of Canada "on the basis of a formal address by both Houses of Parliament". This was in accordance with the precedent set concerning the Constitution Act, 1871. The Constitution Act, 1886 was enacted without provincial consultation or consent.

The Constitution Act, 1915, which increased the representation of Alberta, British Columbia, Manitoba and Saskatchewan in the Senate, and established the Senate floor rule in s 51A of the Constitution Act, 1867, according to which a province cannot have fewer members of the House of Commons than it has Senators, provided that it does not "affect the powers of the Canadian Parliament under the Constitution Act, 1886". Like the Constitution Act, 1886, the Constitution Act, 1915 was enacted without provincial consultation or consent.

The Colonial Laws Validity Act barred Parliament and the provincial legislatures from amending the Constitution Act, 1886; this prohibition was continued by section 7(1) of the Statute of Westminster, 1931, until it was repealed in respect of Canada by the Constitution Act, 1982.

Section 51 of the British North America Act, 1867, enacted by the British North America Act, 1946, required that Yukon be represented in the House of Commons by one member and that "such other part of Canada not comprised within a province as may from time to time be defined by the Parliament of Canada" also be represented by one member. This requirement was later reenacted as subsection 51(2) of the British North America Act, 1867 by the Parliament of Canada.

In the Upper House Reference, the Supreme Court suggested that Parliament's power under section 1 of the Constitution Act, 1886 overlaps with Parliament's more general power to make laws in relation to the "amendment...of the Constitution of Canada" (subject to certain exceptions) under subsection 91(1) of the British North America Act, 1867, which was conferred on Parliament in 1949. Several academics have taken the same view. Subsection 91(1) of the British North America Act, 1867 has since been replaced by section 44 of the Constitution Act, 1982, which empowers Parliament to make laws amending the Constitution of Canada in relation to the Senate and the House of Commons, provided that those laws do not alter the "fundamental nature and role" of the Senate and the House of Commons.

The Constitution Act, 1886 was originally known as the British North America Act, 1886, but it was renamed Constitution Act, 1886 in 1982. The Constitution Act, 1886 was not repealed by the Constitution Act, 1982, so it continues to coexist with section 44 of the Constitution Act, 1982.

Since the Constitution Act, 1886 was enacted in English only by the Parliament of the United Kingdom, there is no official French version of the Act. Section 55 of the Constitution Act, 1982 requires the Minister of Justice to prepare a translation of the Act and that it be brought forward for enactment. Although a translation was prepared in accordance with section 55 by 1990, it has not been brought forward for enactment.

== Territorial representation in Parliament ==
There are currently three populated territories which are part of Canada, but which are not part of any province: the Northwest Territories, Nunavut and Yukon. Each territory is currently represented by one member of the Senate and one member of the House of Commons.

Members of the Senate representing the Northwest Territories, Nunavut and Yukon are selected in the same manner as other Senators and members of the House of Commons representing the territories are elected in the same manner as other members. These members have the same privileges, immunities and powers as other members of the Senate and House of Commons.

The Northwest Territories were represented in the Senate from 1888 until the creation of Alberta and Saskatchewan in 1905. Yukon MP Erik Nielsen first proposed the renewal of territorial representation in the Senate in 1959. The Northwest Territories and Yukon have been represented in the Senate since 1975 and Nunavut has been represented in the Senate since its creation in 1999. Territorial senators are not considered part of a regional division of the Senate. The qualifications required of Senators under section 23 of the Constitution Act, 1867 were adapted for those representing the territories so that they could fulfill their real property requirement and be resident in their territory.

Part of the Northwest Territories were represented in the House of Commons from 1886 until the creation of Alberta and Saskatchewan in 1905. Yukon has been represented in the House of Commons since 1902. The Northwest Territories and Yukon were represented by the same member of the House of Commons between 1949 and 1952. After the 1952 election, the western portion of the Northwest Territories was represented by its own member; after the 1979 election, an additional member was added to the House of Commons to represent the eastern portion of the Northwest Territories. Nunavut, which was created from the eastern portion of the Northwest Territories, has been represented in the House of Commons since its creation in 1999. During its existence as a separate territory from 1876 to 1905, Keewatin was not represented in the Senate or the House of Commons.

The level of representation of the territories in the House of Commons is in spite of their small populations relative to those of the provinces and indeed, relative to nearly all federal electoral districts. In 1915, former Prime Minister, Sir Wilfrid Laurier criticized the representation of the territories permitted by the Constitution Act, 1886 as inconsistent with representation by population. In 1987, the Supreme Court of British Columbia (British Columbia's court of original jurisdiction) noted that "representation for the territories [in the House of Commons] has never been based strictly upon population".

Most of the First Nations citizens in the Northwest Territories and Yukon were not eligible to vote in an election for members of the House of Commons or qualified for membership in the Commons from 1870 until 1960. Inuit citizens in the Northwest Territories and Yukon were similarly disenfranchised from 1934 until 1950.

== Effects and limits ==
=== Effect on provincial interests and representation ===
In 1979, in the Reference re Authority of Parliament in relation to the Upper House, the Supreme Court of Canada noted that the actual granting of representation in the Senate and the House of Commons to the territories by virtue of section 1 of the Constitution Act, 1886 "did not in any substantial way affect federal-provincial relationships". Guy Tremblay and André Grenier took the view that the Constitution Act, 1886 did not detract from provincial legislative authority because it transferred to Parliament part of the residual authority retained by the Parliament of the United Kingdom.

In their dissenting opinion in the Reference re Resolution to amend the Constitution in 1981, Chief Justice Laskin and Justices Estey and McIntyre noted that the Constitution Act, 1886 was enacted "without provincial consultation and consent" despite its effects on provincial interests. Senator Eugene Forsey seems to share the dissenting judges' concern. This concern was noted by W.H.P. Clement as early as 1892; Clement warned that "it is in the power of the Dominion government to swamp the Senate, so long as the additional members are appointed to represent the [territories]". James Ross Hurley, a former senior public servant, noted that "a radical increase in territorial senators could, at some point, be challenged as a violation of the federal principle". More recently, Jesse Hartery warned that "any increase to the number of seats provided to the territories [in the House of Commons beyond the existing one seat each]...may result in major distortions to the principle of representation by population" in the Commons.

=== Relationship with democratic rights ===
Parliament's power to "make provision for the representation in the...House of Commons...of any territor[y]" under s 1 of the Constitution Act, 1886 is limited by the democratic rights guaranteed by the Canadian Charter of Rights and Freedoms. Jesse Hartery suggests that section 3 of the Charter requires that each territory be represented by its own member of the House of Commons, which would preclude a return to the representation of two territories by a single member, as was the case between 1949 and 1952. Section 3 of the Charter guarantees to Canadian citizens in each territory "right to vote in an election of members of the House of Commons...and to be qualified for membership therein". Section 3 applies to "the Parliament...of Canada in respect of all matters within the authority of Parliament including all matters relating to the Yukon Territory and Northwest Territories" (emphasis added) by virtue of paragraph 32(1)(a) of the Charter.

=== Relationship with Nunavut treaty rights ===
Although the Nunavut Land Claims Agreement requires the creation of Nunavut as a separate territory with public government and a legislative assembly, the Agreement does not address Nunavut's representation in the Senate or the House of Commons. The political accord contemplated by the Nunavut Land Claims Agreement, which is not a treaty, also does not address Nunavut's representation.

== Proposed amendments ==
The Constitution Act, 1886 would not have been repealed by the Victoria Charter or the Meech Lake Accord, two unsuccessful attempts to reform the Constitution of Canada. A third attempt, the Charlottetown Accord, would have (at least impliedly) repealed the Constitution Act, 1886 in part and added a paragraph 21(1)(b) to the Constitution Act, 1867, which would have provided that "one [Senator] shall be elected for each territory, namely the Yukon Territory and the Northwest Territories".

As interveners in the Senate Reform Reference, the Attorneys General of the Northwest Territories and Nunavut took the position that the federal government must consult the territorial governments before abolishing or reforming the Senate. The Supreme Court did not comment on the territorial attorneys general's arguments.

== Similar powers in other federations ==
In Australia, section 122 of the Constitution of the Commonwealth of Australia provides that Parliament "may allow the representation of [any territory surrendered by any State to and accepted by the Commonwealth, or of any territory placed by the Queen under the authority of and accepted by the Commonwealth, or otherwise acquired by the Commonwealth] in either House of the Parliament to the extent and on the terms which it thinks fit". The Australian Capital Territory, the Northern Territory and Australia's external territories are represented in both the Australian Senate and the Australian House of Representatives. The High Court of Australia confirmed the constitutional validity of the representation of the Australian Capital Territory and Northern Territory in Western Australia v Commonwealth (1975) and Queensland v Commonwealth.

In India, the Constitution provides for the representation of union territories in the two Houses of its Parliament, the Lok Sabha (House of the People) and the Rajya Sabha (Council of States). Some union territories, such as Puducherry, are represented in both Houses and some, such as Ladakh, are not.

In the United States, the Constitution does not contemplate the representation of territories in the United States Congress. Territories are not represented in the United States Senate. Territories are represented in a limited manner in the United States House of Representatives by non-voting members.

== See also ==
- Full text of the Constitution Act, 1886.
- French version of the Constitution Act, 1886 proposed by the French Constitutional Drafting committee. An alternative French version was published in the Revised Statutes of Canada in 1985 and reprinted in the Revised Statutes of Ontario in 1990.
- Constitution Act, 1915
- Constitution Act, 1975 (No 1)
- Constitution Act, 1975 (No 2)
- Constitution Act, 1999 (Nunavut)
- List of Canadian territorial senators
