= Saskatchewan First Act =

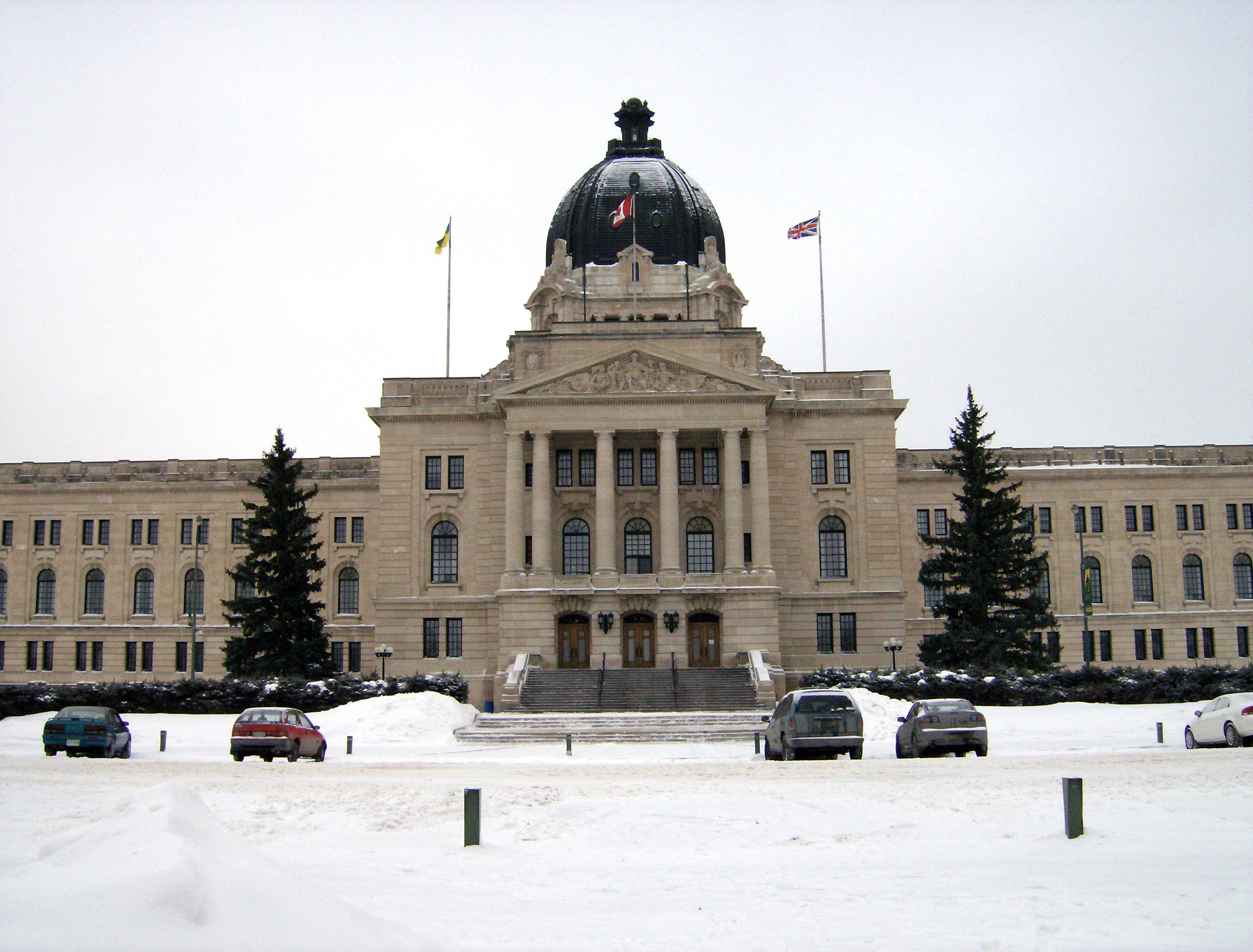

Legislative Assembly of Saskatchewan
- Long title: An Act to Assert Saskatchewan's Exclusive Legislative Jurisdiction and to Confirm the Autonomy of Saskatchewan
- Territorial extent: Saskatchewan
- Enacted by: Legislative Assembly of Saskatchewan
- Enacted: March 16, 2023

Legislative history
- Bill citation: Bill 88
- Introduced by: Attorney General Bronwyn Eyre
- Introduced: November 1, 2022
- First reading: November 1, 2022
- Second reading: November 28, 2022
- Third reading: March 16, 2023
- Status: In force

The Saskatchewan First Act is an act first introduced on November 1, 2022, during the third sitting of the 29th Saskatchewan Legislature. The act was passed on March 16, 2023. The purpose of the act is to confirm Saskatchewan's autonomy and to re-assert its constitutional jurisdiction over natural resources. The act has faced concerted opposition from Indigenous nations. Attorney General Bronwyn Eyre has written forcefully in support of the legislation, arguing that it will fight federal intrusion on exclusive provincial rights, as enumerated in section 92A of the Constitution Act, 1867. Eyre also publicized her bill to such bodies as the Saskatchewan and Regina Chambers of Commerce. Blockades, which had been threatened by Indigenous leaders in December 2022, had not occurred as of December 2023.

== Background ==
Saskatchewan was established as a province in 1905 without control over its own natural resources. While the province received federal grants as compensation for this lack of resource control, it remained without this control until the natural resources acts in 1930, which gave the province, and other Western provinces, control of their own resources. Despite these acts, decisions of the Supreme Court of Canada in the 1970s would go on to limit the ability of the provinces to regulate the use of their natural resources.

When the Canadian constitution was patriated in 1982, Saskatchewan and Alberta, another Western Canadian province, insisted on the addition of Section 92A to the Constitution Act, 1867, which deals with provincial jurisdiction over natural resources. Despite this, Western alienation, the view that Canada’s western provinces have been marginalized within Confederation, has persisted to present day, being espoused most prominently by the Reform Party of Canada, which served as the federal Official Opposition from 1997 to 2000. Rationale for Western alienation extends beyond resource rights to other federal policies such as carbon pricing, equalization payments, and firearms buyback programs.

The Saskatchewan Party government, led by Premier Scott Moe since 2018, has been a persistent critic of federal environmental legislation. In 2018, Saskatchewan launched an unsuccessful court challenge against the federal Greenhouse Gas Pollution Pricing Act; Saskatchewan argued that the act was unconstitutional, but in March 2021, the Supreme Court of Canada ruled that it is in fact constitutional. Saskatchewan also acted as an intervenor against the federal government in Alberta's successful constitutional challenge against the 2019 federal Impact Assessment Act, which was struck down in 2023.

After the 2019 federal election, Moe called for a "New Deal with Canada", espousing sentiments of western alienation and demanding expanded provincial powers in areas like immigration, taxation, and policing. After the 2020 provincial election, in which the separatist Buffalo Party received more than 2.5% of the popular vote, Moe addressed Buffalo supporters, saying "[w]e share your frustrations, and we share many of your objectives" and calling for more "independence" and "autonomy" for the province. Moe reiterated these calls after the 2021 federal election, suggesting that Saskatchewan should be considered a "nation within a nation".

== Legislative history ==
In October 2022, Moe's government released a white paper on provincial autonomy titled "Drawing the Line: Defending Saskatchewan's Economic Autonomy." The paper claimed that the province stood to lose more than $100 billion by 2035 due to federal environmental policies and asserted that the province was prepared to attempt further court actions against pollution regulation; it also reiterated Moe's desire for more provincial power in taxation, immigration, and other areas. The paper was widely criticized for its economic analysis and its lack of attention to Indigenous peoples and rights. However, the paper promised the introduction of a bill addressing federalism in the fall legislative sitting.

The Saskatchewan First Act was introduced on November 1, 2022. The bill passed a second reading on November 28, with six members of the Opposition New Democratic Party joining the governing party in voting in support of the legislation. The bill passed its third and final reading on March 16, 2023. A first tribunal was named under the Saskatchewan First Act on November 28, 2023, to inquire into the federal Clean Electricity Regulations, which are to be implemented under the Canadian Environmental Protection Act, 1999, as administered by the Minister of the Environment.

== Impact on the Canadian Constitution ==
As a result of the Saskatchewan First Act, section 90S was added to Part V of the Constitution Act, 1867 by the Saskatchewan provincial government using the unilateral amending procedure set out in section 45 of the Constitution Act, 1982.

Section 90S reads:

Saskatchewan
90S.1 (1) Saskatchewan has autonomy with respect to all of the matters falling under its exclusive legislative jurisdiction pursuant to this Act.

(2) Saskatchewan is and always has been dependent on agriculture, and on the development of its non-renewable natural resources, forestry resources and electrical energy generation and production.

(3) Saskatchewan’s ability to control the development of its non-renewable natural resources, its forestry resources and its electrical energy generation and production is critical to the future well-being and prosperity of Saskatchewan and its people.

== See also ==
- Alberta Sovereignty Within a United Canada Act
