= Constitution Act, 1871 =

Part of the Constitution of Canada

Constitution Act, 1871 Loi constitutionnelle de 1871

Part of the Constitution of Canada
- Long title: An Act respecting the establishment of Provinces in the Dominion of Canada
- Citation: 34-35 Vict., c. 28 (UK) (original citation); SC 1872, p. li; RSC 1985, App. II, No. 11 (alternative citation)
- Territorial extent: Canada
- Considered by: Cabinet of Canada; Senate of Canada; House of Commons of Canada
- Enacted by: Parliament of the United Kingdom
- Assented to by: Victoria
- Royal assent: June 29, 1871
- Commenced: June 29, 1871

Text of statute as originally enacted
- Status: Current legislation

The Constitution Act, 1871 (French: Loi Constitutionelle de 1871) is one of the enactments which make up the Constitution of Canada. It deals with the creation of new provinces and the governance of Canadian territory that is not part of any province. It was proposed by the Cabinet of Canada and approved by resolutions passed by the Canadian House of Commons and the Senate. It was then enacted by the British Parliament as the British North America Act, 1871.

In the Patriation process in 1982, the act was recognised as part of the Constitution of Canada. It was renamed at that time.

As part of the Constitution of Canada, the Constitution Act, 1871 can only be amended in Canada, using the amending process set out in the Constitution Act, 1982. The British North America Act, 1871 continues to be a British statute and can be amended or repealed by the British Parliament. Any such amendment or repeal would not apply in Canada and would not affect the Constitution Act, 1871.

== Summary of provisions ==
=== Preamble ===
The preamble sets out the uncertainty that had arisen concerning the federal Parliament's ability to create new provinces and to govern territory not found in any province.

=== Section 1: Short title ===
Section 1 sets out the short title of the act. When enacted in 1871, the short title was the British North America Act, 1871, continuing the naming pattern set by the British North America Act, 1867.

In 1982, the Patriation of the Constitution of Canada ended the power of the British Parliament to amend the various provisions which make up the Constitution. The constitutional enactments now can only be amended based on the amending formula set out in the Constitution Act, 1982.

As part of that process, the British North America Acts, including this act, were renamed the Constitution Acts.

=== Section 2: Establishment of new provinces ===
Section 2 gave the federal Parliament the power to establish new provinces. Parliament used this power to establish the provinces of Alberta and Saskatchewan in 1905.

This power has likely been replaced by s. 42(1)(e) of the Constitution Act, 1982, which provides that an amendment to the Constitution of Canada under the general amending procedure is required to establish a new province "notwithstanding any existing law or practice".

=== Section 3: Alteration of provincial boundaries ===
Section 3 provides that the Parliament of Canada "may from time to time, with the consent of the Legislature of any Province of the said Dominion, increase, diminish, or otherwise alter the limits of such Province, upon such terms and conditions as may be agreed upon to by the said Legislature, and may, with the like consent, make provision respecting the effect and operation of any such increase or diminution or alteration of territory in relation to any Province affected thereby".

Section 3 may have been replaced by s. 43(a) of the Constitution Act, 1982.

=== Section 4: Parliament's powers in relation to the territories ===
Section 4 gives Parliament the power to legislate for the "administration, peace, order and good government of any territory not for the time being included in any Province". There are currently three territories which are part of Canada, but which are not part of any province: the Northwest Territories, Nunavut and Yukon. The constitutions of the three territories are set out in federal statutes passed under this authority.

=== Section 5: Validation of Manitoba Act ===
Section 5 retroactively validates the Manitoba Act, 1870.

=== Section 6: Parliament cannot amend acts ===
Section 6 provides that once Parliament has passed a statute to create a new province, it cannot amend that statute.

== French version ==
Since the Constitution Act, 1871 was enacted in English, there is no official French version of the Act. Section 55 of the Constitution Act, 1982 requires the Minister of Justice to prepare a translation of the Act and that it be brought forward for enactment. Although a translation was prepared in 1990, it has not been brought forward for enactment.

== See also ==
Full text of the Constitution Act, 1871.

Constitution Act, 1886
