= British North America Acts =

Laws formerly the central part of the Canadian constitution

The British North America Acts, 1867–1975, are a series of acts of Parliament that were at the core of the Constitution of Canada, prior to Patriation of the Constitution in 1982. Most were enacted by the Parliament of the United Kingdom and some by the Parliament of Canada. Some of the acts were repealed in Canada by the Constitution Act, 1982. The rest were renamed the Constitution Acts and amended, with those changes having effect only in Canada. The Canadian versions of the Constitution Acts are part of the Constitution of Canada, and can be amended only in Canada.

The British versions of the acts which remain in force in Britain are ordinary British statutes. They can be amended by the British Parliament, but those amendments would not have any effect in Canada. They retain their original names and do not include any amendments made by the Canadian Parliament after 1952. The last amendment by the British Parliament, prior to Patriation in 1982, was in 1964.

As used in these acts, the term "British North America" (BNA) originally referred to the British colonies in North America which formed Canada in 1867: the Province of Canada (which became the provinces of Ontario and Quebec), Nova Scotia, and New Brunswick. The 1867 act also envisaged that specific other colonies might join Confederation in the future: British Columbia, Newfoundland, Prince Edward Island, Rupert's Land, and the North-Western Territory. Even after the creation of Canada in 1867, the subsequent acts listed in this article continued to use the term "British North America", but the term then applied only to Canada.

== Constitutional changes ==
Canada dates its history as a country to the British North America Act, 1867, which came into effect on July 1, 1867. However, Canada was not established as fully independent, since the United Kingdom retained legislative control over Canada and full control over Canadian foreign policy. Canada did not have any foreign embassies until the first one was established in Washington, D.C., in 1926. Until 1949, changes to the British North America Acts could be made only by the British Parliament. The British North America (No. 2) Act, 1949, gave the Parliament of Canada the power to make limited constitutional amendments, but full Canadian control over the constitution was not achieved until the passage of the Canada Act 1982. This long delay was in large part due to the inability to agree upon a procedure for making constitutional amendments that was acceptable to all of the provinces, in particular the Province of Quebec.

Because of this, all British North America Acts dated before 1949 were enacted by the Parliament of the United Kingdom, while some of those dated after 1949 were passed by the Parliament of Canada. When Canada patriated its constitution with the passage of the Canada Act 1982, most of the British North America Acts were renamed as Constitution Acts in Canada, while a few of the acts were repealed as no longer having any relevance. The acts are collectively called the Constitution Acts, 1867 to 1982.

== French-language versions ==
The fifteen BNA Acts enacted by the United Kingdom Parliament do not have official French-language versions. Only the English version is official. The five BNA Acts enacted by the Canadian Parliament do have official French-language versions, and the English-language and French-language versions are equally authoritative (as with all legislation enacted by the Canadian Parliament).

The French Constitutional Drafting Committee produced translations of all the British North America Acts, pursuant to section 55 of the Constitution Act, 1982, but these have not been enacted by the federal and provincial governments through the constitutional amending process to make them official.

== Individual acts ==
The different acts of this series are distinguished by appending the year of their enactment. BNA Acts were passed in 1867, 1871, 1886, 1907, 1915, 1916*, 1930, 1940, 1943*, 1946*, 1949, 1949 (No. 2)*, 1951*, 1952*, 1960, 1964, 1965, 1974, 1975 and 1975 (No. 2). Those marked with (*) were repealed in Canada in 1982, but are still in force in Britain. Five of the British North America Acts were enacted by the Parliament of Canada; namely those of 1952, 1965, 1974, 1975, and 1975 (No. 2). The other fifteen were enacted by the Imperial Parliament in London.

The first act, the British North America Act 1867, created the (internally) self-governing Dominion of Canada. The remaining acts dealt with a variety of topics, though the majority were concerned with modifying the representation in Parliament or in the Senate of Canada as the country enlarged and changed (1886, 1915, 1943, 1946, 1952, 1974, 1975, 1975 (No. 2)), adding the newer provinces of Manitoba, British Columbia, Saskatchewan, Alberta, and Newfoundland. Other topics include modifying the country's boundaries (1871, 1949), transfer payments (1907), temporary changes due to two world wars (1916, 1943), federal-provincial powers (1930, 1964), power over changes in the constitution (1949 (No. 2)), the creation of new social programs (1951, 1964), and mandatory retirement ages in the Canadian government (1960, 1965)

=== British North America Act 1867 ===
The British North America Act 1867 (30 & 31 Vict. c. 3), also known as the BNA Act, comprises a major part of the Constitution of Canada. The act entails the original creation of a federal dominion and sets the framework for much of the operation of the Government of Canada, including its federal structure, the House of Commons of Canada, the Senate, the justice system, and the taxation system. In 1982, this act was renamed the Constitution Act, 1867, with the patriation of the constitution (having originally been enacted by the Parliament of the United Kingdom). Amendments were also made at this time: section 92A was added, giving the provinces greater control over non-renewable natural resources.

=== British North America Act 1871 ===
The British North America Act 1871 (34 & 35 Vict. c. 28) gave Canada the power to establish new provinces and territories and to change provincial boundaries with the affected province's consent. The act recognized the creation of the province of Manitoba, and also the incorporation of Rupert's Land and the Northwest Territories into Canada. This act also allowed the Canadian parliament and the legislatures of Ontario and Quebec to redraw the boundaries of the province of Ontario and the province of Quebec in order to include parts of these land acquisitions, specifically around Hudson Bay and James Bay. In 1982, this act was renamed the Constitution Act, 1871.

=== British North America Act 1886 ===
The British North America Act 1886 (58 & 59 Vict. c. 35) gave parliament the authority to allow the Territories of Canada to have representation in the Canadian Senate and Canadian House of Commons. In 1982, this act was renamed the Constitution Act, 1886.

=== British North America Act 1907 ===
British North America Act 1907 (Note: Section 2.)
- Act of Parliament
- Parliament of the United Kingdom
- Long title: An Act to make further provision with respect to the sums to be paid by Canada to the several Provinces of the Dominion.
- Citation: 7 Edw. 7. c. 11
- Territorial extent: United Kingdom

Dates
- Royal assent: 9 August 1907
- Commencement: 1 July 1907

Status: Current legislation

Text of statute as originally enacted

The British North America Act 1907 (7 Edw. 7. c. 11) regulated transfer payments by the federal government to the smaller provinces to support their legislatures and governments. The funds transferred were set at between $100,000 and $250,000 depending on the province's population with an extra $100,000 a year for ten years to British Columbia. In 1982, this Act was renamed the Constitution Act, 1907.

=== British North America Act 1915 ===
British North America Act 1915 (Note: Section 3.)
- Act of Parliament
- Parliament of the United Kingdom
- Long title: An Act to amend the British North America Act, 1867.
- Citation: 5 & 6 Geo. 5. c. 45
- Territorial extent: United Kingdom

Dates
- Royal assent: 19 May 1915
- Commencement: 19 May 1915 (Note: The Acts of Parliament (Commencement) Act 1793.)
Other legislation
Amends	British North America Act 1867
Amended by	Statute Law Revision Act 1927

Status: Partially repealed

Text of statute as originally enacted

Revised text of statute as amended

Text of the British North America Act 1915 as in force today (including any amendments) within the United Kingdom, from legislation.gov.uk.

The British North America Act 1915 (5 & 6 Geo. 5. c. 45) expanded the Senate of Canada by giving the Western Canadian provinces 24 senators, the same number that had been guaranteed to Ontario, Quebec, and the Maritime Provinces. This act also guaranteed Newfoundland six senators should that British domain ever join the Confederation – which it did in 1949. Finally, this act amended section 51 of the British North America Act 1867 to guarantee that no province would have fewer members of the House of Commons than of the senate. In 1982, this act was renamed the Constitution Act, 1915.

=== British North America Act 1916 ===
British North America Act 1916
- Act of Parliament
- Parliament of the United Kingdom
- Long title: An Act to amend the British North America Act, 1867.
- Citation: 6 & 7 Geo. 5. c. 19
- Territorial extent: United Kingdom

Dates
- Royal assent: 1 June 1916
- Commencement: 1 June 1916
- Repealed: 22 December 1927
Other legislation
Amends	British North America Act 1867
Repealed by	Statute Law Revision Act 1927

Status: Repealed

Text of statute as originally enacted

The British North America Act 1916 (6 & 7 Geo. 5. c. 19) extended the duration of the 12th Canadian Parliament through October 1917, beyond the normal maximum of five years. The extension was carried out due to World War I. This act was repealed by the Statute Law Revision Act 1927.

=== British North America Act 1930 ===
British North America Act 1930 (Note: Section 3.)
- Act of Parliament
- Parliament of the United Kingdom
- Long title: An Act to confirm and give effect to certain agreements entered into between the Government of the Dominion of Canada and the Governments of the Provinces of Manitoba, British Columbia, Alberta and Saskatchewan respectively.
- Citation: 20 & 21 Geo. 5. c. 26
- Territorial extent: United Kingdom

Dates
- Royal assent: 10 July 1930
- Commencement: 10 July 1930

Status: Current legislation

Text of statute as originally enacted

The British North America Act 1930 (20 & 21 Geo. 5. c. 26) gave the newer provinces of British Columbia, Alberta, Manitoba, and Saskatchewan rights over certain natural resources found in federally controlled lands. In 1982, this act was renamed the Constitution Act, 1930.

=== British North America Act 1940 ===
British North America Act 1940
- Act of Parliament
- Parliament of the United Kingdom
- Long title: An Act to include unemployment insurance among the classes of subjects enumerated in section ninety-one of the British North America Act, 1867.
- Citation: 3 & 4 Geo. 6. c. 36
- Territorial extent: United Kingdom

Dates
- Royal assent: 10 July 1940
- Commencement: 10 July 1940
Other legislation
Amends	British North America Act 1867

Status: Current legislation

Text of statute as originally enacted

Text of the British North America Act 1940 as in force today (including any amendments) within the United Kingdom, from legislation.gov.uk.

The British North America Act 1940 (3 & 4 Geo. 6. c. 36) gave the federal government jurisdiction over unemployment insurance, thus allowing such a program to be established on a national level. An earlier attempt to create an Employment and Social Insurance Act during the Great Depression had been ruled to be unconstitutional, since unemployment assistance was judged by the courts to be a provincial responsibility. In 1982, this act was renamed the Constitution Act, 1940.

=== British North America Act 1943 ===
British North America Act 1943
- Act of Parliament
- Parliament of the United Kingdom
- Long title: An Act to provide for the readjustment of the representation of the provinces in the House of Commons of Canada consequent on the decennial census taken in the year one thousand nine hundred and forty-one.
- Citation: 6 & 7 Geo. 6. c. 30
- Territorial extent: United Kingdom

Dates
- Royal assent: 22 July 1943
- Commencement: 22 July 1943

Status: Current legislation

Text of statute as originally enacted

The British North America Act 1943 (6 & 7 Geo. 6. c. 30) delayed redistribution of seats in the Canadian House of Commons until the end of World War II. This Act was repealed in Canada in 1982 fore being obsolete.

=== British North America Act 1946 ===
British North America Act 1946
- Act of Parliament
- Parliament of the United Kingdom
- Long title: An Act to provide for the readjustment of representation in the House of Commons of Canada on the basis of the population of Canada.
- Citation: 9 & 10 Geo. 6. c. 63
- Territorial extent: United Kingdom

Dates
- Royal assent: 26 July 1946
- Commencement: 26 July 1946
Other legislation
Amends	British North America Act 1867

Status: Current legislation

Text of statute as originally enacted

Text of the British North America Act 1946 as in force today (including any amendments) within the United Kingdom, from legislation.gov.uk.

The British North America Act 1946 adjusted the formula for distributing seats in the Canadian House of Commons among the provinces and territories. It was repealed in Canada in 1982, as having been superseded.

=== British North America Act 1949 ===
British North America Act 1949 (Note: Section 3.)
- Act of Parliament
- Parliament of the United Kingdom
- Long title: An Act to confirm and give effect to Terms of Union agreed between Canada and Newfoundland.
- Citation: 12, 13 & 14 Geo. 6. c. 22
- Territorial extent: United Kingdom

Dates
- Royal assent: 23 March 1949
- Commencement: 31 March 1949 (Note: The Terms of Union in the Schedule (term 50) came into force immediately before the expiration of 31 March 1949.)
Other legislation
Amended by	Statute Law (Repeals) Act 1969

Status: Partially repealed

Text of statute as originally enacted

Text of the British North America Act 1949 as in force today (including any amendments) within the United Kingdom, from legislation.gov.uk.

The British North America Act 1949 (12, 13 & 14 Geo. 6. c. 22) allowed for the entry of Newfoundland as Canada's tenth province. This act was renamed the Newfoundland Act when the Canadian Constitution was patriated from the United Kingdom in 1982.

This act should not be confused with the British North America (No. 2) Act 1949 (12, 13 & 14 Geo. 6. c. 81) (see below).

=== British North America (No. 2) Act 1949 ===
British North America (No. 2) Act 1949
- Act of Parliament
- Parliament of the United Kingdom
- Long title: An Act to amend the British North America Act, 1867, as respects the amendment of the Constitution of Canada.
- Citation: 12, 13 & 14 Geo. 6. c. 81
- Territorial extent: United Kingdom

Dates
- Royal assent: 16 December 1949
- Commencement: 16 December 1949
Other legislation
Amends	British North America Act 1867

Status: Current legislation

Text of statute as originally enacted

Text of the British North America (No. 2) Act 1949 as in force today (including any amendments) within the United Kingdom, from legislation.gov.uk.

The British North America (No. 2) Act 1949 (12, 13 & 14 Geo. 6. c. 81) granted Canada limited powers to amend its own constitution. The Parliament of Canada was thereafter allowed to amend the Canadian constitution in many areas of its own jurisdiction without first obtaining the consent of the British Parliament. However, the approval of the British Parliament was still needed for wider constitutional changes, such as those involving areas of provincial and federal responsibilities. Therefore, this act can at best be considered a "partial patriation" of the Canadian Constitution.

This act was repealed in 1982 with the full patriation of the Canadian Constitution from the United Kingdom, and with the incorporation of a new, comprehensive procedure for amending the constitution.

This act is not to be confused with the British North America Act 1949 (12, 13 & 14 Geo. 6. c. 22) (see above).

=== British North America Act 1951 ===
British North America Act 1951
- Act of Parliament
- Parliament of the United Kingdom
- Long title: An Act to amend the British North America Act, 1867.
- Citation: 14 & 15 Geo. 6. c. 32
- Territorial extent: United Kingdom

Dates
- Royal assent: 31 May 1951
- Commencement: 31 May 1951
Other legislation
Amends	British North America Act 1867

Status: Current legislation

Text of statute as originally enacted

Revised text of statute as amended

Text of the British North America Act 1951 as in force today (including any amendments) within the United Kingdom, from legislation.gov.uk.

The British North America Act 1951 (14 & 15 Geo. 6. c. 32) gave the federal government the power to pass legislation concerning old age pensions, while also recognizing the rights of provincial legislatures to do so. While the Canadian Parliament had established an old age pension program in 1927, this was administered by the provinces and jointly funded by them. This act of the British Parliament allowed the Federal government of Canada to administer and operate its own pension plan and allowed it to pass the Old Age Security Act. This act was repealed in Canada in 1982, since it had been superseded.

=== British North America Act, 1952 ===
British North America Act, 1952
- Long title: An Act to amend the British North America Acts, 1867 to 1951, with respect to the Readjustment of Representation in the House of Commons
- Citation: SC 1952, c 15
- Territorial extent: Canada
- Royal assent: 18 June 1952

Amends
- British North America Act 1867
- Status: Repealed

The British North America Act, 1952 was the first of the British North America Acts to be enacted by the Canadian Parliament (rather than by the British Parliament). That had been made possible under the provisions of the British North America (No. 2) Act 1949.

This act changed the number of seats in the House of Commons and it also limited the number of seats that a province could lose due to redistribution based on the national census to 15% of its previous number of seats. This act also gave the Yukon Territory its own Member of Parliament. This act was repealed in 1982 as having become obsolete and superseded.

=== British North America Act 1960 ===
British North America Act 1960
- Act of Parliament
- Parliament of the United Kingdom
- Long title: An Act to amend the British North America Act, 1867.
- Citation: 9 & 10 Eliz. 2. c. 2
- Territorial extent: United Kingdom

Dates
- Royal assent: 20 December 1960
- Commencement: 1 March 1961 (Note: Section 3.)
Other legislation
Amends	British North America Act 1867

Status: Current legislation

Text of statute as originally enacted

Revised text of statute as amended

Text of the British North America Act 1960 as in force today (including any amendments) within the United Kingdom, from legislation.gov.uk.

The British North America Act 1960 (9 & 10 Eliz. 2. c. 2) instituted a mandatory retirement age of 75 for all superior court judges. In 1982, this act was renamed the Constitution Act, 1960.

=== British North America Act 1964 ===
British North America Act 1964
- Act of Parliament
- Parliament of the United Kingdom
- Long title: An Act to amend the British North America Act 1867.
- Citation: 1964 c. 73
- Territorial extent: United Kingdom

Dates
- Royal assent: 31 July 1964
- Commencement: 31 July 1964
Other legislation
Amends	British North America Act 1867

Status: Current legislation

Text of statute as originally enacted

Revised text of statute as amended

Text of the British North America Act 1964 as in force today (including any amendments) within the United Kingdom, from legislation.gov.uk.

The British North America Act 1964 (c. 73) extended the federal government's jurisdiction over pensions to include those of survivor's benefits and disability benefits while continuing to allow the provinces to have their own pension programs. This amendment to the BNA Act made the Canada Pension Plan possible. In 1982, this act was renamed the Constitution Act, 1964.

This was the last time that the British Parliament enacted legislation on Canada's behalf before the patriation of the Canadian constitution in 1982. The inability of Canada to amend its own constitution already seemed antiquated in 1964. In the debate, a British MP called it an "astonishing and absurd historical anomaly" that "the Canadian Parliament is the only Parliament in the Commonwealth that has to come to us to ask permission to legislate about domestic matters."

=== British North America Act, 1965 ===
Constitution Act, 1965

Parliament of Canada
- Long title: An Act to make provision for the retirement of members of the Senate
- Citation: SC 1965, c 4, part I
- Territorial extent: Canada
- Royal assent: 2 June 1965

Amends
- British North America Act 1867
- Status: Current legislation

This was the second of the British North America Acts to be enacted by the Parliament of Canada. This was made possible by the provisions of the British North America (No. 2) Act 1949.

This act established a mandatory retirement age of 75 for all members who were appointed to the Canadian Senate in future. Those who had been appointed before the passage of this act were exempted. In 1982, this act was renamed the Constitution Act, 1965.

=== British North America Act, 1974 ===
Constitution Act, 1974

Parliament of Canada
- Long title: An Act to provide for representation in the House of Commons, to establish electoral boundaries commissions and to remove the temporary suspension of the Electoral Boundaries Readjustment Act
- Citation: SC 1974-75-76, c 13, part I
- Territorial extent: Canada
- Royal assent: 20 December 1974

Amends
- British North America Act 1867
- Status: Current legislation

The British North America Act, 1974 was the third of the British North America Acts to be enacted by the Parliament of Canada. This had been made possible by the provisions of the British North America (No. 2) Act 1949.

It was originally titled Representation Act, 1974, then changed to British North America Act, 1974 in 1977 before changing to Constitution Act, 1974 in 1982.

This act changed the rules for the redistribution of seats in the House of Commons of Canada so that Quebec was allocated the fixed number of 75 seats, while the number of seats allocated to each of the other provinces would always be determined based upon the sizes of their populations in comparison with that of Quebec. However, the Provinces continued to be guaranteed to have at least as many members of the House of Commons as they had Senators. In 1982, this act was renamed the Constitution Act, 1974.

=== British North America Act, 1975 ===
Constitution Act (No. 1), 1975

Parliament of Canada
- Long title: An Act to increase the representation of the Northwest Territories in the House of Commons and to establish a commission to readjust the electoral boundaries of the Northwest Territories
- Citation: SC 1974-75-76, c 28, part I
- Territorial extent: Canada
- Royal assent: 13 March 1975

Amends
- British North America Act 1867
- Status: Repealed

The British North America Act, 1975 was the fourth of the British North America Acts to be enacted by the Parliament of Canada. This had been made possible by the provisions of the British North America (No. 2) Act 1949.

It was originally titled Northwest Territories Representation Act, then changed to British North America Act (No 1), 1975 in 1977 before changing to Constitution Act (No. 1), 1975 in 1982.

This act increased the number of representatives from the Northwest Territories in the Canadian House of Commons, from one to two members. In 1982, this act was renamed the Constitution Act (No. 1), 1975.

=== British North America Act (No. 2), 1975 ===
Constitution Act (No. 2), 1975

Parliament of Canada
- Long title: An Act to amend the British North America Acts, 1867 to 1975
- Citation: SC 1974-75-76, c 53
- Territorial extent: Canada
- Royal assent: 19 March 1975
- Status: Current legislation

The British North America Act (No. 2), 1975 was the fifth of the British North America Acts to be enacted by the Parliament of Canada.

This act increased the number of seats in the Canadian Senate from 102 to 104, and it allocated one seat to the Yukon Territory and one to the Northwest Territories. In 1982, this act was renamed the Constitution Act (No. 2), 1975.

=== Canada Act 1982 ===
The Canada Act 1982, the final act of the British Parliament regarding Canada had a different name, since it renamed all the unrepealed earlier British North America Acts, amended some of them, and repealed all others, patriated all remaining legislative and constitutional powers to Canada, and included the Constitution Act, 1982 as its schedule. It is the only UK legislation to be enacted in both English and French, although the French version has equal authority only in Canada.

== See also ==
- Canadian Confederation
- List of Canadian constitutional documents
