= List of Alberta senators =

This is a list of past and present members of the Senate of Canada representing the province of Alberta.

It had one senator starting in 1888. Three more were added in 1905, at time of granting of province-hood. Two more were added in 1915, first appointed in February 1918.

But long-standing vacancies can exist, so at various times since 1918, Alberta has not always had six senators.

Since 1965, senators have been able to serve only until they reach the age of 75.

== Current senators ==
Name	Party	Division (Note: Senators are appointed to represent Alberta. Each senator may choose to designate a geographic area within Alberta as their division.)	Date appointed	Appointed by (Note: Senators are appointed by the governor general of Canada on the advice of the prime minister)	Mandatory retirement
Scott Tannas	Canadian Senators Group	Alberta	March 25, 2013 (Note: Appointed after winning a senator-in-waiting position in the 2012 Alberta Senate nominee election.)	Harper	February 25, 2037
Paula Simons	Independent Senators Group	Alberta	October 3, 2018	Trudeau	September 7, 2039
Patti LaBoucane-Benson	Non-affiliated	Alberta	October 3, 2018	Trudeau	February 20, 2044
Karen Sorensen	Progressive Senate Group	Alberta	July 29, 2021	Trudeau	October 9, 2031
Daryl Fridhandler	Progressive Senate Group	Alberta	August 31, 2024	Trudeau	October 9, 2031
Kristopher Wells	Progressive Senate Group	Alberta	August 31, 2024	Trudeau	October 7, 2046

== Historical ==
Name	Party	Division	Date appointed	Appointed by	End of term
Tommy Banks	Liberal	Alberta	April 7, 2000	Chrétien	December 17, 2011
Martha Bielish	Progressive Conservative	Lakeland	September 27, 1979	Clark	September 26, 1990
Aristide Blais	Liberal	St. Albert	January 29, 1940	King	November 10, 1964
Richard Hardisty	Conservative	District of Alberta	February 23, 1888	MacDonald	October 15, 1889
Bert Brown	Conservative	Alberta	July 10, 2007 (Note: Appointed after winning a senator-in-waiting position in the 2004 Alberta Senate nominee election.)	Harper	March 22, 2013
John Alexander Buchanan	Progressive Conservative	Edmonton	January 15, 1959	Diefenbaker	October 2, 1965
William Ashbury Buchanan	Liberal	Lethbridge	September 5, 1925	King	July 11, 1954
Patrick Burns	Independent	Calgary	July 6, 1931	Bennett	June 1, 1936
Donald Cameron	Independent Liberal	Banff	July 28, 1955	St. Laurent	September 19, 1987
Thelma Chalifoux	Liberal	Alberta	November 26, 1997	Chrétien	February 8, 2004
Jean Côté	Liberal	Edmonton	August 14, 1923	King	September 23, 1924
Leverett George DeVeber	Liberal	Lethbridge	March 8, 1906	Laurier	July 9, 1925
Joyce Fairbairn	Liberal	Lethbridge	June 29, 1984	Trudeau, P. E.	January 18, 2013
Jean Forest	Liberal	Edmonton	May 16, 1996	Chrétien	August 28, 1998
Amédée E. Forget	Liberal	Banff	May 2, 1911	Laurier	June 8, 1923
Frederick Gershaw	Liberal	Medicine Hat	April 18, 1945	King	March 26, 1968
Ron Ghitter	Progressive Conservative	Alberta	March 25, 1993	Mulroney	March 31, 2000
James Gladstone	Independent Conservative	Lethbridge	January 31, 1958	Diefenbaker	March 31, 1971
William Griesbach	Conservative	Edmonton	September 15, 1921	Meighen	January 21, 1945
William Harmer	Liberal	Edmonton	February 5, 1918	Borden	September 9, 1947
Earl Hastings	Liberal	Palliser-Foothills	February 24, 1966	Pearson	May 5, 1996
Daniel Philip Hays	Liberal	Calgary	June 29, 1984	Trudeau, P. E.	June 30, 2007
Harry Hays	Liberal	Calgary	February 24, 1966	Pearson	May 4, 1982
Prosper-Edmond Lessard	Liberal	St. Paul	September 5, 1925	King	April 11, 1931
James Lougheed	Liberal-Conservative	Calgary, NWT (1889.12.10 - 1905.08.31); Calgary, AB (1905.09.01 - 1925.11.02)	December 12, 1889	MacDonald	November 2, 1925
James A. MacKinnon	Liberal	Edmonton	May 9, 1949	St. Laurent	April 18, 1958
Ernest Manning	Social Credit	Edmonton West	October 7, 1970	Trudeau, P. E.	September 20, 1983
Elaine McCoy	Canadian Senators Group	Alberta	March 24, 2005	Martin	December 29, 2020
Edward Michener	Conservative	Alberta	February 5, 1918	Borden	June 16, 1947
Grant Mitchell	Non-affiliated	Alberta	March 24, 2005	Martin	April 24, 2020
Bud Olson	Liberal	Alberta South	April 5, 1977	Trudeau, P. E.	March 7, 1996
James Harper Prowse	Liberal	Edmonton	February 24, 1966	Pearson	September 27, 1976
Daniel Edward Riley	Liberal	Alberta	June 25, 1926	King	April 27, 1948
Douglas Roche	Independent	Edmonton	September 17, 1998	Chrétien	June 14, 2004
George Henry Ross	Liberal	Calgary	December 1, 1948	St. Laurent	September 26, 1956
Philippe Roy	Liberal	Edmonton	March 8, 1906	Laurier	April 21, 1911
Wesley Stambaugh	Liberal	Bruce	September 7, 1949	St. Laurent	June 8, 1965
Peter Talbot	Liberal	Alberta	March 8, 1906	Laurier	December 6, 1919
Claudette Tardif	Liberal	Alberta	March 24, 2005	Martin	February 2, 2018
Nicholas Taylor	Liberal	Bon Accord (1996.03.07-1999.01.01); Sturgeon (1999.01.01-2002.11.17)	March 7, 1996	Chrétien	November 17, 2002
Walter Patrick Twinn	Progressive Conservative	Alberta	September 27, 1990	Mulroney	October 30, 1997
Stanley Waters	Reform	Alberta	June 11, 1990 (Note: Appointed after winning a senator-in-waiting position in the 1989 Alberta Senate nominee election.)	Mulroney	September 25, 1991
Betty Unger	Conservative	Alberta	January 6, 2012	Harper	August 20, 2018
Doug Black	Canadian Senators Group	Alberta	January 25, 2013	Harper	October 31, 2021

== Western provinces regional senators ==
Senators listed were appointed to represent the Western Provinces under section 26 of the Constitution Act. This clause can be used to appoint two extra senators to represent four regional Senate divisions: Ontario, Quebec, the Maritimes and the Western Provinces. It has been used only once, in 1990.

As vacancies open up among the normal members of the Senate, they are automatically filled by the regional senators. Regional senators may also designate themselves to a senate division in any province of their choosing in their region.

Name	Party (Note: Party listed was the last party of which the senator was a member.)	Division (Note: Senators are appointed to represent their region. Each senator may choose to designate a geographic area within their region as their division.)	Date appointed	Appointed by	Date shifted to provincial	Province shifted to	Provincial seat vacated by	End of term
Janis Johnson	Conservative	Winnipeg-Interlake	September 27, 1990	Mulroney	October 4, 1990	Manitoba	Joseph-Philippe Guay	September 27, 2016
Eric Berntson	Progressive Conservative	Saskatchewan	September 27, 1990	Mulroney	January 26, 1991	Saskatchewan	David Steuart	February 27, 2001

== See also ==
- Alberta Senate nominee election
- Lists of Canadian senators
