= 1998 Alberta Senate nominee election =

Canadian election

- October 19, 1998

2 persons to become senators-in-waiting
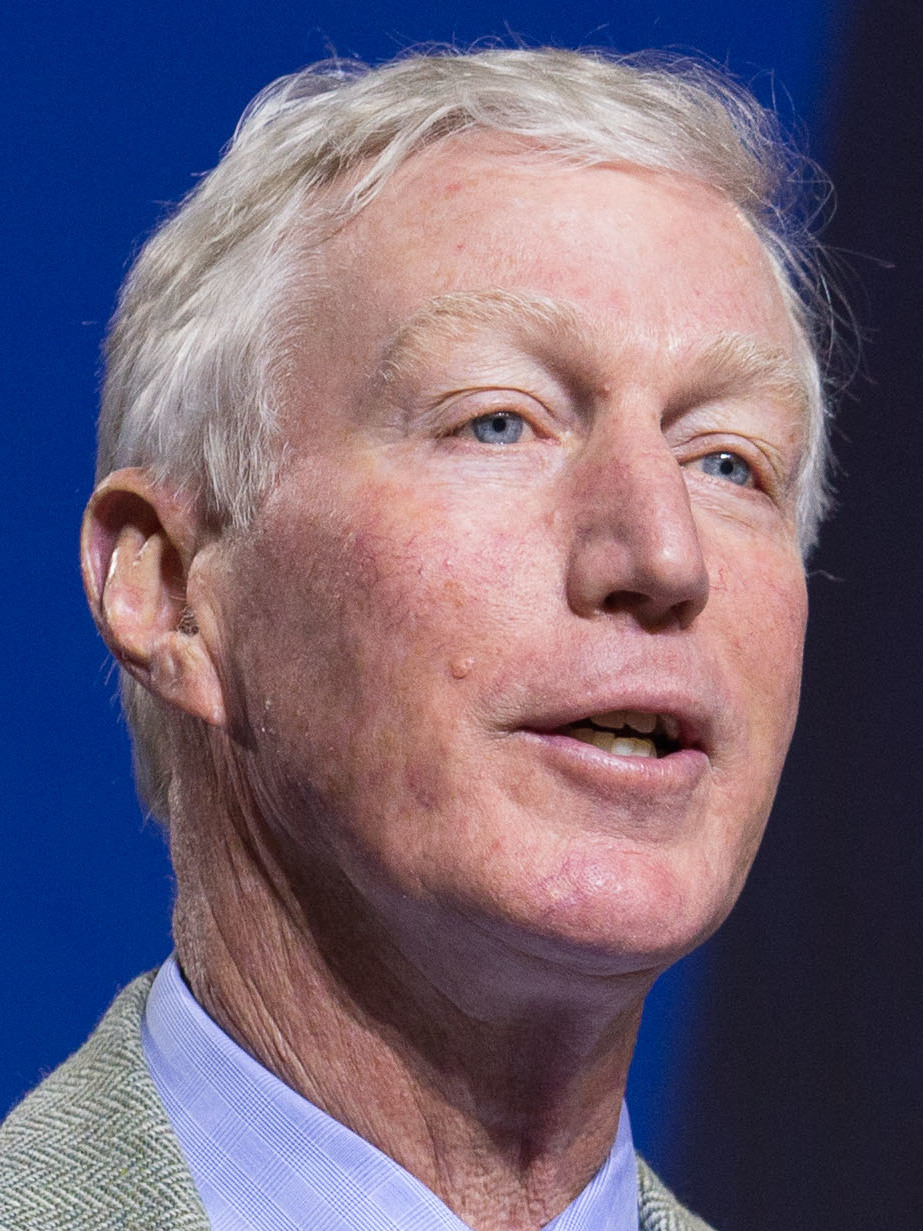
	First party	Second party
	B.B.
Candidate	Bert Brown	Ted Morton
Party	Reform	Reform
Popular vote	332,766	274,126
Percentage	37.32%	30.75%
	Third party	Fourth party
	G.D.	V.G.
Candidate	Guy Desroslers	Vance Gough
Party	Independent	Independent
Popular vote	148,851	135,840
Percentage	16.70%	15.24%

The 1998 Alberta Senate nominee election, formally the 2nd Alberta Senate nominee election of Alberta was held on October 19, 1998, to nominate appointments to the Senate of Canada. The Senate nominee election was held in conjunction with Alberta municipal elections under the Local Authorities Election Act.

The second Senate nominee election took place nine years following the first Senate election held in 1989. Progressive Conservative Prime Minister Brian Mulroney, who was in the midst of Constitutional reforms had reluctantly promised to advise the governor general to appoint the winner of the 1989 election as a senator from Alberta, resulting in Reform Party candidate Stan Waters being called to the Senate on June 11, 1990.

The situation in 1998 was much different, with Liberal Prime Minister Jean Chrétien advising Governor General Adrienne Clarkson to appoint two senators for Alberta shortly before the scheduled Senate nominee election.

Despite these appointments, two senator nominees were selected in a block vote, that was broken down along municipal electoral districts instead of provincial electoral districts. It was conducted by Elections Alberta, and candidates were registered with provincial parties.

Bert Brown and Ted Morton, both nominated by the Reform Party, won the election, but were not appointed to the Senate before their terms expired. No other provincial political party nominated candidates.

== Background ==
In the late-1980s, the Government of Alberta under Premier Don Getty had made vailed statements about holding a province-wide election to select nominees for the Senate with the expectation that Meech Lake Accord would be ratified and the prime minister would make appointments to the Senate on the basis of names submitted by each province's premier. The Senate nominee election was featured in the Speech from the Throne in February 1989 for the fourth session of the 21st Alberta Legislature, but died on the order paper when the legislature was dissolved to hold an early provincial election. The bill was reintroduced in the summer of 1989 during the 22nd Alberta Legislature, which permitted the vote to take place during the October 1989 Alberta municipal elections.

Stan Waters, nominated by the Reform Party, won the 1989 Senate nominee election, with 41.7 per cent of the popular vote. On October 17, 1989, one day after the Senate nominee election, Mulroney stated he was not bound to appoint a senator by the results of the election, and instead intended to follow the process in the Meech Lake Accord. Getty responded to the comments by Mulroney by stating he would provide a list to the prime minister with a single name, Waters. Prime Minister Brian Mulroney had criticized the electoral process, although he nonetheless made a public announcement agreeing to advise Governor General Ray Hnatyshyn to appoint Waters to the Canadian Senate on June 11, 1990.

Waters time in the Senate was cut short when he was diagnosed with brain cancer in the summer of 1991, and died months later in Calgary on September 25, 1991, at the age of 71, four years before the mandatory retirement age for Canadian senators.

=== Appointed senators in the 1990s ===
After appointing Waters, Mulroney went on to appoint two more senators from Alberta, neither of which participated in the Senate nominee election. Walter Patrick Twinn was appointed September 27, 1990 to replace Martha Bielish who retired at the age of 75. Ron Ghitter was appointed on March 25, 1993, to replace Waters after his death.

Prime Minister Jean Chrétien appointed four senators from Alberta prior to the 1998 Alberta Senate nominee election, including Nicholas Taylor on March 7, 1996, Jean Forest on May 17, 1996, Thelma Chalifoux on November 26, 1997, and Douglas Roche. Roche, a former Member of Parliament for the Progressive Conservative Party was appointed to the Senate on September 17, 1998, one month before the 1998 Alberta Senate nominee election was held. Former prime minister Joe Clark criticized the appointment as a "cynical, provocative and wrong". Alberta Premier Ralph Klein penned an open letter to Chrétien criticizing the appointment and calling for Senate reform. Klein went on to criticize Chrétien stating "the prime minister of this country is saying that democracy is a joke".

The Reform Party applied to the Federal Court of Canada for an interlocutory injunction on the appointment until after the Senate nominee election had taken place. Justice Donna McGillis dismissed the injunction, noting the Constitution provides the governor general, on the advice of the prime minister, the absolute authority to appoint senators.

== Election results ==
1998 Alberta Senate nominee election
Party	Candidate	Votes	%
Reform	Bert Brown	332,766	37.32%
Reform	Ted Morton	274,126	30.75%
Independent	Guy Desroslers	148,851	16.70%
Independent	Vance Gough	135,840	15.24%
Total		891,583	–
Source(s) Source:

== See also ==
- 1989 Alberta Senate nominee election
- 2004 Alberta Senate nominee election
- List of Alberta senators
