= Alberta Senate nominee elections =

Nonstandard Canadian elections

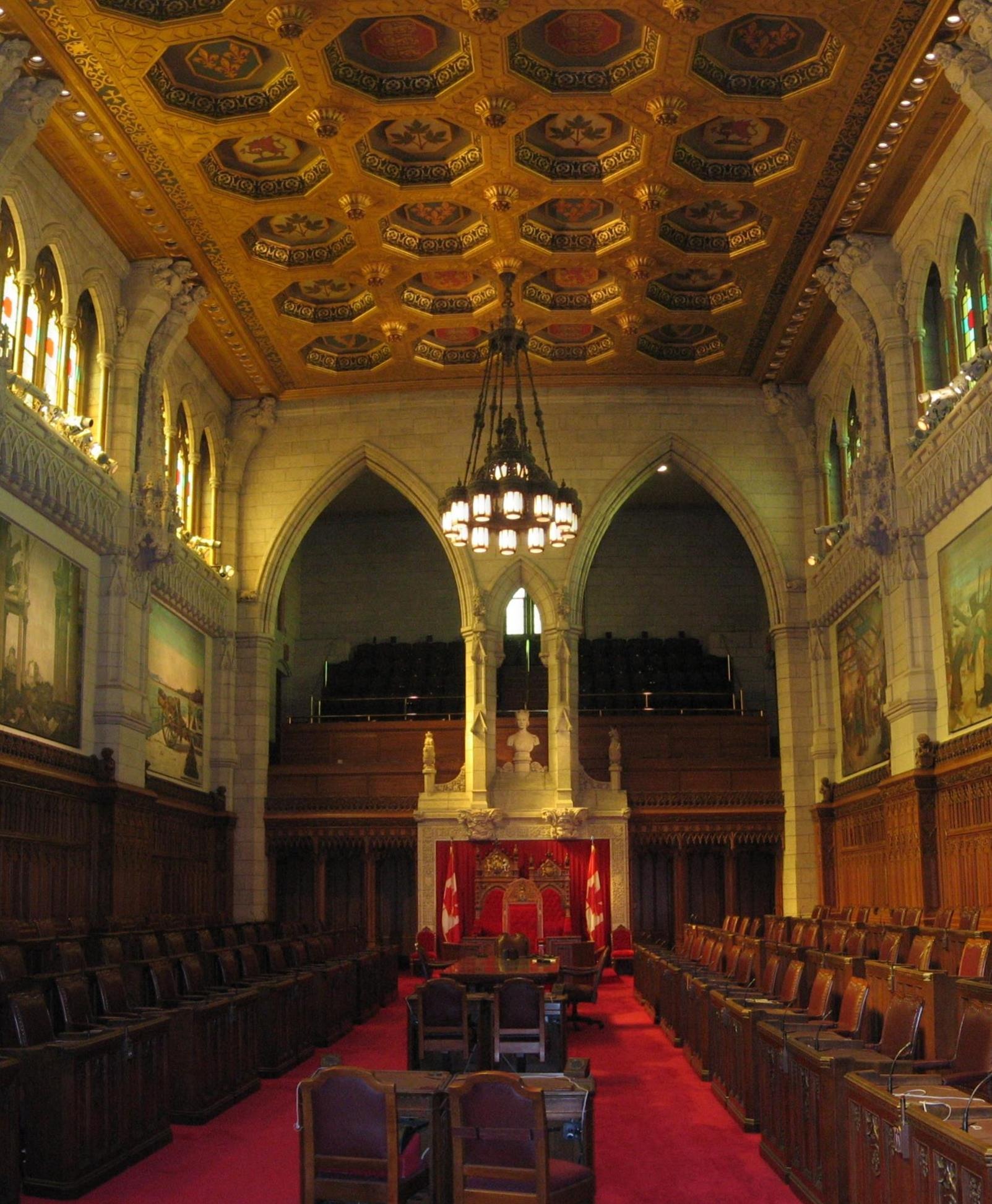
The Senate chamber.

Alberta is the only Canadian province to hold elections for nominees to be appointed to the Senate of Canada. These elections are non-binding, as the appointment of senators is solely the responsibility of the Governor General of Canada according to the Constitution of Canada, on the advice of the Prime Minister.

The process has ultimately resulted in ten (Note: Only 9 individuals were elected; Bert Brown was elected twice.) elected nominees, five of whom have been appointed to the Senate. Scott Tannas is the last elected nominee to still hold his Senate seat. The legislation enabling senate nominee elections initially expired in 2016, a new Act was passed in 2019 and nominee elections resumed in 2021.

== History ==
=== Canadian Senate ===
The Province of Canada, the predecessor to the modern-day provinces of Quebec and Ontario, had a bicameral legislature comprising a lower Legislative Assembly and an upper Legislative Council. The Legislative Assembly was always elected, based on the popular British House of Commons; the Legislative Council, based on the largely hereditary British House of Lords, was originally appointed but became elected in 1856 from 48 divisions.

The province confederated with the maritime provinces in 1867 to form the modern-day country (Note: Full legislative independence from the United Kingdom was not achieved until the Statute of Westminster 1931, nor was full patriation of the constitution until the Constitution Act 1982.) of Canada. Among the new country's constitution was a bicameral legislature comprising the House of Commons and the Senate. Like the House of Lords, but unlike the United States Senate, the Canadian Senate was never intended to have much legislative power in its own right, but rather to act as a chamber of "sober second thought" for bills considered in the House of Commons. Lest an elected body become too powerful, the Senate was appointed rather than elected like the Legislative Council.

Appointments were, and are, made by the governor general; in practice, the governor general has always been advised by the prime minister in selecting these appointments. Whereas the House of Commons is elected from ridings that are redistricted between the various provinces from time to time, senators are appointed based on a fixed number per province, and represent their provinces as a whole. The exception to this is Quebec, where its 24 divisions (Note: The other 24 were in what is now Ontario, and are no longer used.) for electing the Province of Canada's Legislative Council continue to be used as the geographic basis for senatorial appointment.

=== Senatorial reform proposals ===
Proposals to reform the Senate have been floated for decades. Originally a lifetime appointment, mandatory retirement at 75 years of age was implemented for senators in 1965.

=== Albertan senatorial elections ===
Senate nominee elections were initially held under the auspices of Alberta's Senatorial Selection Act of 1987, which was passed in response to a proposal under the Meech Lake Accord that would have required the federal government to appoint senators from lists provided by provincial governments. After the failure of the Meech Lake and subsequent Charlottetown Accords, the federal government continued its traditional practice of appointing senators of its own volition. In 1998, the federal government of Prime Minister Jean Chrétien filled two vacancies in Alberta before an election could be held; the pro-Senate reform provincial government of Ralph Klein then amended the act to hold elections for Senate nominees in advance of vacancies. The amended Senatorial Selection Act required the government to predict how many Alberta vacancies may exist in the Senate (due to the mandatory retirement of senators at the age of 75) in the next six years.

From 1998 onward, Senate nominees were elected for six-year terms as a protest to push for Senate reform. Whenever a vacancy arose in the Senate from Alberta, the Alberta government formally requested that the Prime Minister advise the Governor General to appoint the nominee. This request was only sometimes heeded: Stephen Harper and Brian Mulroney recommended elected nominees for appointment, while Jean Chrétien, Paul Martin, and Justin Trudeau did not. No vacancies occurred during the Kim Campbell government.

In May 2008, the government of Saskatchewan announced plans to hold similar elections, passing a law allowing for elections the following year. However, in 2013 the province abandoned its plans before holding any such elections, repealing the law and instead calling for the Senate to be abolished.

The New Democratic Party formed government in Alberta after the 2015 election, and due to its long-standing policy supporting Senate abolition, allowed the Senatorial Selection Act to expire in 2016. Since taking office in 2015, the Trudeau government at the federal level formalized a new selection process for the Senate, which did not accommodate provincial Senate elections. Jason Kenney of the United Conservative Party restored Senate elections after winning the 2019 provincial election.

=== List of Senate nominee elections ===
- 1989 Alberta Senate nominee election — 1 nominee elected, province-wide single vote (stand-alone election)
- 1998 Alberta Senate nominee election — 2 nominees elected, province-wide block vote (stand-alone election)
- 2004 Alberta Senate nominee election — 4 nominees elected, province-wide block vote (alongside the general election)
- 2012 Alberta Senate nominee election — 3 nominees elected, province-wide block vote (alongside the general election)
- 2021 Alberta Senate nominee election — 3 nominees elected, province-wide block voting (alongside municipal elections)

== Participation ==
No political party has contested all of Alberta's Senate nominee elections. In 1989 and 1998, all of the seats up for election were won by the Reform Party of Alberta, a provincial counterpart to the Reform Party of Canada which was set up solely to run candidates in Senate nominee elections. It disbanded in 2004.

The candidate of the governing Progressive Conservatives, Bert Brown, placed third in the inaugural election in 1989. This led the party to tacitly endorse the Reform candidates in 1998 rather than field its own. However, Progressive Conservatives would win most of the seats up for election in 2004 and 2012.

Although the Alberta Liberal Party did run a candidate in the 1989 Senatorial election when an appointment was guaranteed, it refused to run any candidates in the 1998 and 2004 elections because that would have contradicted the policy of its federal counterpart. The Alberta New Democrats have never supported or contested Senate elections and refused to run candidates in this election – the federal NDP consistently called for the Senate's complete abolition.

The Alberta Alliance and its successor, the Wildrose Party, contested the 2004 and 2012 elections, but failed to win any seats.

All four elections were contested by independent candidates, with Link Byfield winning the last senator-in-waiting seat up for grabs in 2004 (although he was never appointed to the Senate). The 2012 nominee election was also contested by one candidate from the Evergreen Party of Alberta.

== Debate and controversies ==
Senate reform is popular in Western Canada. However, nationally, Alberta's Senate elections are controversial.

Although Stan Waters, elected in the first Senate election of 1989, was appointed to the Senate by Governor General Ray Hnatyshyn on the advice of Prime Minister Brian Mulroney in 1990, subsequently elected Senate nominees were not appointed until 2007 when another Conservative government was in power. Waters died in September 1991 and was replaced with Ron Ghitter, who was not running in the Senate election, meaning an elected senator sat for only 15 months. Prime Minister Paul Martin said he would not recommend for appointment any nominees elected in this fashion because he did not support "piecemeal" Senate reform. Detractors of the Senate nominee election argue that it is a waste of time and money without federal co-operation, while proponents blame federal arrogance for causing the Senate elections to seem useless. The cost of the election is estimated at $3 million by the Alberta government.

In 2004, Bert Brown, Betty Unger and Cliff Breitkreuz, nominated by the Progressive Conservatives, and Link Byfield, an independent, won the election. The federal Liberal government ignored the results.

All six incumbents initially rejected calls to resign in order to make room for an "elected" appointment.

Prime Minister Stephen Harper supported the election of senators. On April 17, 2007, veteran Liberal senator Dan Hays announced he would retire from the Senate by the end of June. The next day, Harper announced that Bert Brown would fill Hays' seat.

Then-Premier Ed Stelmach announced on April 29, 2010, that Alberta was extending the terms of the three senators-in-waiting elected in 2004 beyond November 22, 2010, to December 2, 2013, unless elections were called earlier. The government said the move would save Albertans the cost of the election. The announcement came two days after the federal government introduced Senate election legislation and urged the other provinces to follow Alberta's lead in Senate reform. Reaction from the senators-in-waiting was mixed. Independent Link Byfield panned the decision and has stated he would refuse an appointment without a new mandate. Betty Unger stated the term limits should be respected and fresh elections should be called that fall, though she was ultimately appointed without new elections in 2012. All three incumbents and other pundits agreed that the move was made to help the Progressive Conservatives avoid an election loss to the Wildrose Alliance.

== Senate nominee election results ==
=== Nominees elected ===
| Election | Nominee | Endorsement/ Affiliation (Note: Senate nominee candidates may be either endorsed by a registered Alberta provincial political party or declare an affiliation to a registered federal political party) | Appointed | Prime Minister | Senate caucus | Served until |
|---|---|---|---|---|---|---|
| 1989 | Stan Waters | Alberta Reform Party | Jun 11, 1990 | Brian Mulroney | Reform | Sept 25, 1991 |
| 1998 | Bert Brown | Alberta Reform Party | Not appointed | | | |
| 1998 | Ted Morton | Alberta Reform Party | Not appointed | | | |
| 2004 | Bert Brown | Alberta Progressive Conservative Association | Jul 10, 2007 | Stephen Harper | Conservative | Mar 22, 2013 |
| 2004 | Betty Unger | Alberta Progressive Conservative Association | Jan 6, 2012 | Stephen Harper | Conservative | Aug 20, 2018 |
| 2004 | Cliff Breitkreuz | Alberta Progressive Conservative Association | Not appointed | | | |
| 2004 | Link Byfield | Independent | Not appointed | | | |
| 2012 | Doug Black | Alberta Progressive Conservative Association | Jan 25, 2013 | Stephen Harper | Conservative (2013–2016) | October 31, 2021 |
| 2012 | Doug Black | Alberta Progressive Conservative Association | Jan 25, 2013 | Stephen Harper | ISG (2016–2019) | October 31, 2021 |
| 2012 | Doug Black | Alberta Progressive Conservative Association | Jan 25, 2013 | Stephen Harper | CSG (2019–2021) | October 31, 2021 |
| 2012 | Scott Tannas | Alberta Progressive Conservative Association | Mar 25, 2013 | Stephen Harper | Conservative (2013–2019) | Incumbent |
| 2012 | Scott Tannas | Alberta Progressive Conservative Association | Mar 25, 2013 | Stephen Harper | CSG (2019–present) | Incumbent |
| 2012 | Mike Shaikh | Alberta Progressive Conservative Association | Not appointed | | | |
| 2021 | Pam Davidson | Conservative Party (federal) | In-waiting | | | |
| 2021 | Erika Barootes | Conservative Party (federal) | In-waiting | | | |
| 2021 | Mykhailo Martyniouk | Conservative Party (federal) | In-waiting | | | |

=== Results by provincial party ===
| Party | 1989 | | | 1998 | | | 2004 | | | 2012 | | | 2021 | | |
|---|---|---|---|---|---|---|---|---|---|---|---|---|---|---|---|
| Party | Votes | % | Elected | Votes | % | Elected | Votes | % | Elected | Votes | % | Elected | Votes | % | Elected |
| Progressive Conservative | 127,638 | 20.5% | 0 / 1 | – | | | 1,276,224 | 58.6% | 3 / 5 | 1,089,093 | 40.5% | 3 / 3 | – | | |
| Reform | 259,292 | 41.7% | 1 / 1 | 606,892 | 68.1% | 2 / 2 | – | | | – | | | – | | |
| Liberal | 139,809 | 22.5% | 0 / 1 | – | | | – | | | – | | | – | | |
| Alliance / Wildrose | – | | | – | | | 500,284 | 23.0% | 0 / 3 | 847,470 | 31.5% | 0 / 3 | – | | |
| Evergreen | – | | | – | | | – | | | 149,844 | 5.6% | 0 / 1 | – | | |
| Independent | 94,874 | 15.3% | 0 / 3 | 284,691 | 31.9% | 0 / 2 | 399,833 | 18.4% | 1 / 2 | 604,393 | 22.5% | 0 / 6 | 2,097,921 | 100.0% | 3 / 13 |

=== Results by federal party ===
| Party | 2021 | | |
|---|---|---|---|
| Party | Votes | % | Elected |
| Conservative | 977,473 | 46.6% | 3 / 3 |
| People's | 315,389 | 15.0% | 0 / 3 |
| Independent | 805,059 | 38.4% | 0 / 3 |
