= 1989 Alberta Senate nominee election =

Canadian election

- October 16, 1989

1 person to become senator-in-waiting
	First party	Second party	Third party
	S.W.	B.C.	B.B.
Candidate	Stan Waters	Bill Code	Bert Brown
Party	Reform	Liberal	Progressive Conservative
Popular vote	259,292	139,809	127,638
Percentage	41.7%	22.5%	20.5%

The 1989 Alberta Senate nominee election, formally the 1st Alberta Senate nominee election of Alberta was held on October 16, 1989, to nominate appointments to the Senate of Canada. The Senate nominee election was held in conjunction with Alberta municipal elections under the Local Authorities Election Act, and resulted in the first Canadian Senator appointed following a popular election.

The vote was held along municipal electoral boundaries, but conducted by Elections Alberta. Candidates were registered with provincial parties.

Stan Waters, nominated by the Reform Party, won the election, and was subsequently appointed to the Senate.

== Background ==
The Government of Alberta under Premier Peter Lougheed had taken a position on Senate reform through balanced provincial membership and elected representatives as a mechanism to balance regional interests. In 1983, the Legislative Assembly of Alberta established the Select Special Committee on Upper House Reform, the committee's 1985 report Strengthening Canada: Reform of Canada's Senate served as the basis for provincial calls for reform in the 1980s.

The Government of Alberta under Premier Don Getty had made vailed statements in the late-1980s about holding a province-wide election to select nominees for the Senate with the expectation that Meech Lake Accord would be ratified and the Prime Minister would make appointments to the Senate on the basis of names submitted by each province's premier. Additional credibility for the Senate nominee election came when sitting Solicitor General Marvin Moore announced he was leaving politics in February 1989 to contest the Senate nominee election prior to the 1989 Alberta general election, this announcement was followed by a similar announcement by Deputy Premier Dave Russell. The Senate nominee election was featured in the Speech from the Throne in February 1989 for the fourth session of the 21st Alberta Legislature, but died on the order paper when the legislature was dissolved to hold an early provincial election. The Progressive Conservative government campaigned on Senate reform during the election in the face of waning popularity with Alberta's financial difficulties relating to the drop in oil prices, collapse of the Principal Group and concerns over Getty's leadership.

The Progressive Conservative government was re-elected with a lower portion of the popular vote, while Premier Don Getty lost in his own riding and was subsequently elected to the legislature in a by-election. The bill was reintroduced in the June 1989 during the 22nd Alberta Legislature and received royal assent on August 18. The bill which permitted the vote to take place during the October 1989 Alberta municipal elections.

While Prime Minister Brian Mulroney was supportive of provincially nominated Senators, he did not support the concept of an election that would provide only a single name for the Prime Minister to consider.

=== Candidates ===
The Reform Party of Canada was eager to participate in the Senate nominee election, and federal party leaders created the Reform Party of Alberta in 1989 with the purpose of participating in the Senate nominee election, and not the Alberta general elections. A nomination meeting was scheduled in Red Deer for August 28, 1989 with each of the 26 federal constituency associations of the Reform Party in Alberta eligible to send 10 voting delegates to suggest names of candidates. The nomination was a major success for the Reform Party as a majority of the 26 constituency associations sent the maximum of 10 candidates. Retired Lieutenant-general Stan Waters gave a passionate speech criticizing out of control federal spending and announced his goal in the Senate would be to "carve into the hearts of every Ottawa politician the words 'Cut Spending'". Waters won the Reform Party nomination on the first ballot, defeating Edmonton Alderman Robert Matheson and Calgary lawyers Murray Smith and Victor Burstall. The Reform Party was well organized with Diane Ablonczy, Jim Denis and Preston Manning guiding the campaign, and the party budgeting for the Senate nominee election exceeded $250,000, with $80,000 destined for television advertising. The results of this effort were the Reform Party candidate Waters receiving a majority of the votes in rural Alberta and Calgary, and finishing second in Edmonton. University of Lethbridge political scientist Faron Ellis credits the 1989 Senate nominee election with lending creditability to the upstart Reform Party prior to the 1993 Canadian general election.

The Progressive Conservative Association of Alberta had three candidates contest the party's nomination, former Solicitor General Marvin Moore, Triple-E Senate campaigner Bert Brown and Brian Heidecker. The nomination convention was scheduled for September 16, and Moore dropped out to support Brown who won the nomination when 10,000 party members voted. Brown's candidacy was undermined by Progressive Conservative Party of Canada Members of Parliament urging Albertans not to participate in the election. Furthermore, Brown's popularity was hurt through his conservative association with Mulroney's government which was in the process of introducing the Goods and services tax.

The Liberal Party of Alberta saw Bill Code acclaimed as the candidate in mid-September when sitting MLA Nicholas Taylor declined to contest the nomination, which would have required him to resign from the legislature. Code described himself as centralist who saw the importance of a "strong central government" but also believed "regions should be strong". Code was a former Liberal Party candidate in the 1984 Canadian federal election, and served as the head of the inquiry into the Principal Group, a group of financial companies based in Edmonton which failed in 1987 resulting in losses to 67,000 people.

The New Democratic Party of Alberta decided not to field a candidate in the Senate nominee election.

Three independent candidates participated in the Senate nominee election. Former Progressive Conservative MLA Tom Sindlinger, an economist known for being expelled from the Progressive Conservative Party by Premier Peter Lougheed over his views on constitutional reform in 1980. The second independent, Kenneth Paproski a physician, and former Progressive Conservative MLA for 11 years. The third independent was Irricana newspaper publisher Gladys Taylor.

== Aftermath ==
On October 17, 1989, one day after the Senate nominee election, Mulroney stated he was not bound to appoint a Senator by the results of the election, and instead intended to follow the process in the Meech Lake Accord. Getty responded to the comments by Mulroney by stating he would provide a list to the Prime Minister with a single name, Waters. Prime Minister Brian Mulroney had criticized the electoral process, although he nonetheless made a public announcement agreeing to advise Governor General Ray Hnatyshyn to appoint Waters to the Canadian Senate on June 11, 1990.

Mulroney's decision came after pressure from Premier Getty and Reform Party Member of Parliament Deborah Grey. The agreement struck between Mulroney and Getty to appoint Waters to the Senate included a promise that Alberta would not hold another Senate nominee election for at least five years, and a newly established commission would study Senate reform. This agreement was despite the fact Alberta Senator Martha Bielish was set to hit mandatory retirement age in October 1990. Mulroney stated he would not appoint another elected Senator in Canada until after the commission had completed its study on Senate reform.

The appointment was celebrated by opposition parties including New Democratic MP Ross Harvey (Edmonton East), and Liberal Senator Joyce Fairbairn as the first Senator elected in a free and fair manner.

Waters time in the Senate was cut short when he was diagnosed with brain Cancer in the Summer of 1991, and died months later in Calgary on September 25, 1991, at the age of 71, four years before the mandatory retirement age for Canadian Senators.

After appointing Waters, Mulroney went on to appoint two more Senators from Alberta, neither of which participated in the Senate nominee election. Walter Patrick Twinn was appointed September 27, 1990 to replace Martha Bielish who retired at the age of 75. Ron Ghitter was appointed on March 25, 1993, to replace Waters after his death.

Prime Minister Jean Chrétien appointed four Senators from Alberta prior to the 1998 Alberta Senate nominee election, including Nicholas Taylor on March 7, 1996, Jean Forest on May 17, 1996, Thelma Chalifoux on November 26, 1997, and Douglas Roche. Roche, a former Member of Parliament for the Progressive Conservative Party was appointed to the Senate on September 17, 1998, one month before the 1998 Alberta Senate nominee election was held. Former Prime Minister Joe Clark criticized the appointment as a "cynical, provocative and wrong". Alberta Premier Ralph Klein penned an open letter to Chrétien criticizing the appointment and calling for Senate reform. Klein went on to criticize Chrétien stating "the prime minister of this country is saying that democracy is a joke".

== Candidates and results ==
1989 Alberta Senate nominee election
Party	Candidate	Votes	%
Reform	Stan Waters	259,292	41.7%
Liberal	Bill Code	139,809	22.5%
Progressive Conservative	Bert Brown	127,638	20.5%
Independent	Gladys Taylor	38,534	6.2%
Independent	Kenneth Paproski	30,849	5.0%
Independent	Tom Sindlinger	25,491	4.1%
Total		621,613	–
Source(s) Source:

== See also ==
- 1998 Alberta Senate nominee election
- 2004 Alberta Senate nominee election
- List of Alberta senators
