= Canadian Senate divisions =

Canadian Senate divisions refers to two aspects of the Senate of Canada. First, it refers to the division of Canada into four regional Senate divisions of 24 senators each, as set out in section 22 of the Constitution Act, 1867. The four regions are the Western Provinces, Ontario, Quebec and the Maritimes. These regions are intended to serve the Senate's purpose of providing regional representation in the Parliament of Canada, in contrast to the popular representation that the House of Commons is intended to provide. While not within any of the original four Senate divisions, Senate seats are also allocated to Newfoundland and Labrador and the three territories. The four divisions can be expanded when the need arises to have an extra two senators appointed to each regional division.

Second, it refers to divisions within a province represented by senators from the Senate, also known as "senatorial designation". Under the Constitution, only Quebec has official Senate divisions for each of the senatorial designations within the province. In all other provinces, senators are appointed to represent the province as a whole and the Constitution makes no reference to official senatorial designations for those provinces. Senators from provinces outside Quebec may simply "designate" a district they wish to symbolically represent within their province, which can be named at the time of their appointment or at a later time. These senate divisions have no specific geographic boundaries though their names often give a reference to a general geographic area. However a senator will sometimes create boundaries for their senate division even though it has no legal status. While relatively rare, a senator outside of Quebec can change their division in the same manner as party affiliation, simply by notifying the Clerk of the Senate.

== Senate seats ==
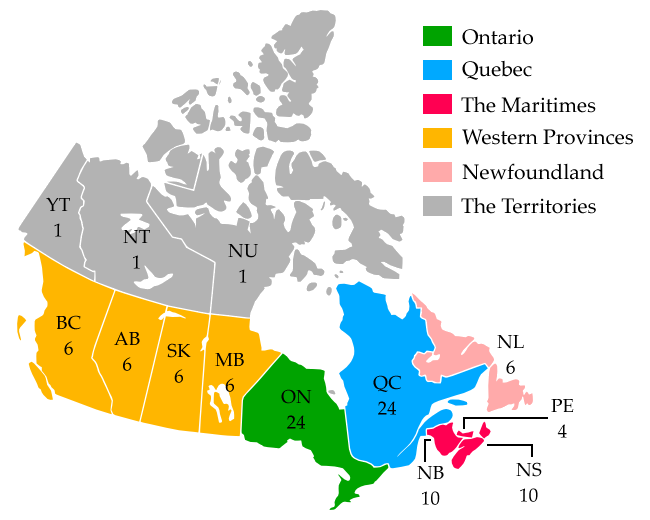
Map of the regional Senate divisions

Unlike the House of Commons, seats in the Senate are not based upon any population measure or adjusted by population (an exception to this was set out under the Manitoba Act, in which Manitoba's allotment increased until the province reached a target population). Rather, they are fixed under the Constitution Act 1867 (in the case of Quebec), or are established upon the appointment of a senator and cease to exist when the senator leaves office (outside of Quebec).

The Constitution also provides that a province cannot have fewer seats in the House of Commons than it has in the Senate. There are currently 105 seats in the Senate. Seats are divided among provinces and territories and can only change with a constitutional amendment, or a constitutional provision that allows seats to change based on certain conditions. Beyond the constitutional allotment of Senate seats per province, the seats are grouped into four regions of 24 seats. Provisions under section 26 of the Constitution Act exist to add up to two extra seats per region, with no more than 113 members allowed to sit in the Senate.

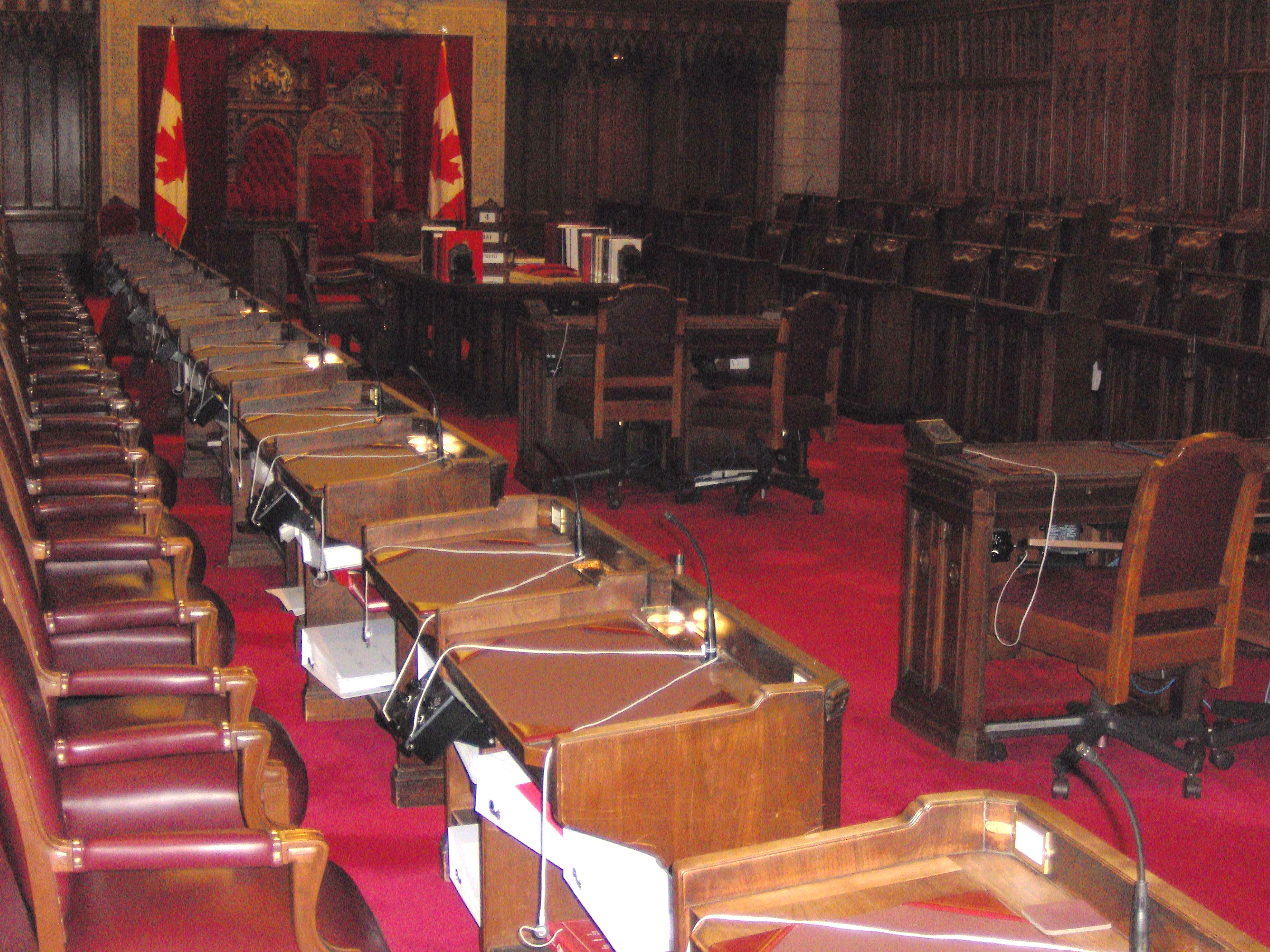
Seats in the Senate chamber in the Centre Block.

Senators have the same constitutional provisions to offer services as members of the House of Commons. This includes a rarely used provision to maintain a constituency office. Three senators currently have such offices. Two of the three have not designated themselves to a specific division, but to represent their province as a whole. While constituency offices are rare, all senators maintain an office on Parliament Hill.

=== Evolution of Senate seats ===
Evolution of Senate seats
| Province (joined Canada) | 1867 | 1870 | 1871 | 1873 | 1874 | 1879 | 1882 | 1889 | 1903 | 1905 | 1915 | 1949 | 1975 | 1999 |
|---|---|---|---|---|---|---|---|---|---|---|---|---|---|---|
Ontario regional division (1867)
| Ontario (1867) | 24 | 24 | 24 | 24 | 24 | 24 | 24 | 24 | 24 | 24 | 24 | 24 | 24 | 24 |
Quebec regional division (1867)
| Quebec (1867) | 24 | 24 | 24 | 24 | 24 | 24 | 24 | 24 | 24 | 24 | 24 | 24 | 24 | 24 |
The Maritimes regional division (1867)
| New Brunswick (1867) | 12 | 12 | 12 | 11 | 10 | 10 | 10 | 10 | 10 | 10 | 10 | 10 | 10 | 10 |
| Nova Scotia (1867) | 12 | 12 | 12 | 11 | 10 | 10 | 10 | 10 | 10 | 10 | 10 | 10 | 10 | 10 |
| Prince Edward Island (1873) | – | – | – | 4 | 4 | 4 | 4 | 4 | 4 | 4 | 4 | 4 | 4 | 4 |
The Western Provinces regional division (1915)
| Alberta (1905) | – | – | – | – | – | – | – | – | – | 4 | 6 | 6 | 6 | 6 |
| British Columbia (1871) | – | – | 3 | 3 | 3 | 3 | 3 | 3 | 3 | 6 | 6 | 6 | 6 | 6 |
| Manitoba (1870) | – | 2 | 2 | 2 | 2 | 2 | 3 | 4 | 4 | 4 | 6 | 6 | 6 | 6 |
| Saskatchewan (1905) | – | – | – | – | – | – | – | – | – | 4 | 6 | 6 | 6 | 6 |
The territories (1879)
| Northwest Territories (1870) | – | 0 | 0 | 0 | 0 | 2 | 2 | 2 | 4 | 0 | 0 | 0 | 1 | 1 |
| Nunavut (1999) | – | – | – | – | – | – | – | – | – | – | – | – | – | 1 |
| Yukon (1898) | – | – | – | – | – | – | – | – | 0 | 0 | 0 | 0 | 1 | 1 |
Newfoundland and Labrador (1949)
| Newfoundland and Labrador (1949) | – | – | – | – | – | – | – | – | – | – | – | 6 | 6 | 6 |
| Total | 72 | 74 | 77 | 79 | 77 | 79 | 80 | 81 | 83 | 90 | 96 | 102 | 104 | 105 |

Note:

- 1870 The Manitoba Act, 1870 allows for two Senate seats with an expansion up to four adding seats at 50,000 and 75,000 population.
- 1871 The British Columbia terms of Union, 1871 provides three seats for British Columbia
- 1873 Under the Prince Edward Terms of Union 1873 Prince Edward Island was given four seats. New Brunswick and Nova Scotia lost two seats to decrease when the first two senators leave office.
- 1873 New Brunswick Senator William Steeves dies, dropping New Brunswick to 11 seats
- 1873 Nova Scotia Senator John Locke dies, dropping Nova Scotia to 11 seats.
- 1874 New Brunswick Senator Robert Hazen dies, dropping New Brunswick to 10 seats
- 1874 Nova Scotia Senator Ezra Churchill dies, dropping Nova Scotia to 10 seats
- 1879 Northwest Territories granted 2 seats.
- 1882 Manitoba reaches the population requirements for its third seat, it gained its fourth in 1889.
- 1903 Northwest Territories granted 2 additional seats.
- 1905 Saskatchewan and Alberta are created from the Northwest Territories with 4 seats each, under the Saskatchewan and Alberta Act's Northwest Territories loses 4 seats.
- 1915 the Western provinces division was created and the seats of the four western provinces were set to six each.
- 1949 Newfoundland and Labrador joined Confederation, and was allotted six seats.
- 1975 The Yukon is granted its first seat, and the Northwest Territories re-gains one seat after 70 years.
- 1999 Nunavut was created from the Northwest Territories and allotted one seat.

== Quebec regional division ==
Map of the Quebec regional divisions

The Quebec regional division was created in 1867, at the time of Confederation. Quebec has had 24 seats since 1867. The region covers the entire province. Quebec is unique in that its 24 senatorial designations are set out in the Constitution Act, 1867 and defined in the Consolidated Statutes of Canada 1859. These divisions are the same as those that Canada East held in the Legislative Council of Canada prior to Canadian Confederation. The stated purpose of retaining the Senate divisions within Quebec is to protect the interests of religious and linguistic minorities inside the province. Quebec senators must own property in their represented divisions.

An exception to the requirement for Quebec senators to represent a specific division occurs when the Prime Minister directly advises the Sovereign to temporarily expand the Senate under the Regional Expansion Clause in Section 26 of the British North America Act. This clause can be used to increase the Senate seats by 1 or 2 senators for each region, including Quebec. Prime Minister Brian Mulroney is to date the only one to exercise this clause, on September 27, 1990. Under the clause, Senators Normand Grimard and Thérèse Lavoie-Roux represented self-designated divisions within Quebec following their appointments to the Senate. Senators appointed under Section 26 may name a senatorial designation of their own choosing in the same manner as a senator from the other nine provinces and any such self-designation carries similar status.

Quebec's Senate divisions have not changed since Confederation and remain based on the province's 1867 boundaries. Although the territory of the province has expanded northward twice (in 1898 and 1912) the division boundaries were never changed to accommodate the boundary changes, thus leaving Northern Quebec unrepresented in the Senate. At the time, this was a relatively uncontroversial anomaly because the additional territory was primarily populated by First Nations peoples, who did not gain the right to vote until the 1960s.

Quebec permanent divisions
| Division | # senators | Vacant |
|---|---|---|
| Alma | 8 | |
| Bedford | 8 | |
| De la Durantaye | 12 | |
| De la Vallière | 8 | |
| De Lanaudière | 8 | |
| De Lorimier | 9 | |
| De Salaberry | 10 | |
| Grandville | 8 | |
| Gulf | 11 | |
| Inkerman | 6 | |
| Kennebec | 10 | |
| La Salle | 13 | |
| Lauzon | 10 | |
| Mille Isles | 17 | |
| Montarville | 10 | |
| Repentigny | 8 | |
| Rigaud | 12 | |
| Rougemont | 11 | |
| Saurel | 9 | |
| Shawinegan | 8 | |
| Stadacona | 10/11^{*} | |
| The Laurentides | 11 | |
| Victoria | 10 | |
| Wellington | 10 | |

Quebec self-designated divisions
| Division | # senators |
|---|---|
| Acadie | 1 |
| Quebec | 1 |

Note:

^{*}Narcisse-Fortunat Belleau declined appointment to the Senate and Stadacona Senate division. Ten senators have served out terms in Stadacona.

See List of Quebec senators

== Ontario regional division ==
Map of the Ontario regional division

The Ontario regional division was created at the time of Confederation in 1867. The region covers the entire province and has not had any changes in seat numbers since 1867.

Ontario has been the most populous province and region in Canada since the birth of the country in 1867. The province has expanded its boundaries twice, to cover land once part of the Northwest Territories. Ontario also holds more seats in the House of Commons of Canada than any other province.

The capital of Canada, Ottawa is located within Ontario.

Ontario self-designated divisions
| Division | # Current | # Historical | Total |
|---|---|---|---|
| Ontario | 5 | 27^{1} | 32 |
| Toronto | 3 | 15 | 18 |
| Ottawa | 1 | 6 | 7 |
| Rideau | 1 | 2 | 3 |
| Cobourg | 1 | 1 | 2 |
| Ottawa-Vanier | 1 | 1^{1} | 2 |
| St. Mary's | 1 | 1 | 2 |
| Bloor & Yonge/Toronto | 1 | - | 1 |
| Kingston-Frontenac-Leeds | 1 | - | 1 |
| Markham | 1 | - | 1 |
| Metro Toronto | 1 | - | 1 |
| Northern Ontario | 1 | - | 1 |
| Ottawa/Rideau Canal | 1 | - | 1 |
| Pakenham | 1 | - | 1 |
| Peel County | 1^{2} | - | 1 |
| Toronto Centre-York | 1^{3} | - | 1 |
| Toronto Centre | 1^{3} | 1 | 2 |
| Brampton | 1^{2} | - | 1 |
| Hamilton | - | 6 | 6 |
| London | - | 5 | 5 |
| Kingston | - | 4 | 4 |
| Peel | - | 4 | 4 |
| Brockville | - | 3 | 3 |
| Carleton | - | 3 | 3 |
| Lambton | - | 3 | 3 |
| North York | - | 3 | 3 |
| Bowmanville | - | 2 | 2 |
| Erie | - | 2 | 2 |
| Grey | - | 2 | 2 |
| Kenora-Rainy River | - | 2 | 2 |
| Leeds | - | 2 | 2 |
| Lincoln | - | 2 | 2 |
| Middlesex | - | 2 | 2 |
| Milton | - | 2 | 2 |
| Niagara | - | 2 | 2 |
| Nipissing | - | 2 | 2 |
| Ottawa East | - | 2 | 2 |
| Oxford | - | 2 | 2 |
| Russell | - | 2 | 2 |
| Saugeen | - | 2 | 2 |
| Sudbury | - | 2 | 2 |
| Toronto South | - | 2 | 2 |
| Welland | - | 2 | 2 |
| Windsor | - | 2 | 2 |
| York | - | 2 | 2 |
| Alexandria | - | 1 | 1 |
| Algoma | - | 1 | 1 |
| Barrie | - | 1 | 1 |
| Belleville | - | 1 | 1 |
| Bothwell | - | 1 | 1 |
| Brantford | - | 1 | 1 |
| Burlington | - | 1 | 1 |
| Cataraqui | - | 1 | 1 |
| Cochrane | - | 1 | 1 |
| Dovercourt | - | 1 | 1 |
| East Toronto | - | 1 | 1 |
| East York | - | 1 | 1 |
| Eganville | - | 1 | 1 |
| Essex | - | 1 | 1 |
| Glen Tay | - | 1 | 1 |
| Gormley | - | 1 | 1 |
| Grafton | - | 1 | 1 |
| Grenville | - | 1 | 1 |
| Halton | - | 1 | 1 |
| Hamburg | - | 1 | 1 |
| Hanover | - | 1 | 1 |
| Hastings | - | 1 | 1 |
| Hastings-Frontenac | - | 1 | 1 |
| Huron | - | 1 | 1 |
| Huron-Perth | - | 1 | 1 |
| Kent | - | 1 | 1 |
| King's | - | 1 | 1 |
| Leeds and Grenville | - | 1 | 1 |
| Lindsay | - | 1 | 1 |
| Midland | - | 1 | 1 |
| Monck | - | 1 | 1 |
| Nepean | - | 1 | 1 |
| Newcastle | - | 1 | 1 |
| Newmarket | - | 1 | 1 |
| Norfolk | - | 1 | 1 |
| North Bruce | - | 1 | 1 |
| North Wellington | - | 1 | 1 |
| Northumberland | - | 1 | 1 |
| Ottawa West | - | 1 | 1 |
| Ottawa Valley | - | 1 | 1 |
| Parkdale | - | 1 | 1 |
| Parkhill | - | 1 | 1 |
| Pembroke | - | 1 | 1 |
| Perth | - | 1 | 1 |
| Perth North | - | 1 | 1 |
| Peterborough | - | 1 | 1 |
| Peterborough West | - | 1 | 1 |
| Pickering | - | 1 | 1 |
| Port Hope | - | 1 | 1 |
| Port Severn | - | 1 | 1 |
| Prescott | - | 1 | 1 |
| Prince Edward | - | 1 | 1 |
| Quinté | - | 1 | 1 |
| Renfrew | - | 1 | 1 |
| Rockcliffe | - | 1 | 1 |
| Rosedale | - | 1 | 1 |
| St. Catharines | - | 1 | 1 |
| St. Thomas | - | 1 | 1 |
| Sarnia | - | 1 | 1 |
| Scarborough Junction | - | 1 | 1 |
| Simcoe | - | 1 | 1 |
| Simcoe East | - | 1 | 1 |
| South Bruce | - | 1 | 1 |
| South Western Ontario | - | 1 | 1 |
| South York | - | 1 | 1 |
| Surprise Lake | - | 1 | 1 |
| Toronto-Parkdale | - | 1 | 1 |
| Toronto-Spadina | - | 1 | 1 |
| Toronto-Rosedale | - | 1 | 1 |
| Toronto-Taddle Creek | - | 1 | 1 |
| Toronto-Trinity | - | 1 | 1 |
| Toronto West | - | 1 | 1 |
| Trent | - | 1 | 1 |
| Trenton | - | 1 | 1 |
| Victoria | - | 1 | 1 |
| Waterloo | - | 1 | 1 |
| Wellington South | - | 1 | 1 |
| Wentworth | - | 1 | 1 |
| Windsor-Walkerville | - | 1 | 1 |
| Woodstock | - | 1 | 1 |
| York-Caboto | - | 1 | 1 |
| York Centre | - | 1 | 1 |
| Total senators | | | 227/230 |
| Vacant Seats | | | 2 |

Note:

1. Senator Jean-Robert Gauthier changed from Ontario to Ottawa-Vanier
2. Senator Lorna Milne changed from Brampton to Peel County
3. Senator Anne Cools changed from Toronto Centre to Toronto Centre-York

See List of Ontario senators

== Western Provinces regional division ==
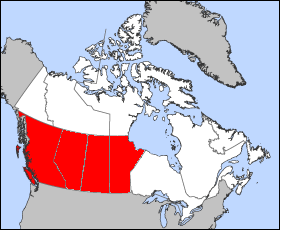
Western Provinces regional division

The Western provinces regional division was created under the Constitution Act, 1915 to bring the total to four regional divisions. Six senators would represent each of the four western provinces Alberta, British Columbia, Manitoba and Saskatchewan for a total of 24 senators.

Prior to 1915 the provinces were not organized into a region, and had their own path of evolution. Manitoba gained seats on a set population expansion clause. Alberta and Saskatchewan gained seats from the Northwest Territories. British Columbia was given seats outlined in the Terms of Union.

Alberta has held popular elections for senators, although the Prime Minister is not obliged to nominate the winner of any such election to the Senate. Nonetheless, three winners of such elections have been nominated to the Senate: Senator Stan Waters was elected in the 1989 Alberta Senate nominee election, and Senators Bert Brown and Betty Unger were elected senators-in-waiting in 2004.

Alberta self-designated divisions
| Division | # Current | # Historical | Total |
|---|---|---|---|
| Alberta | 6 | 14 | 20 |
| Banff | - | 2 | 2 |
| Alberta South | - | 1 | 1 |
| Bruce | - | 1 | 1 |
| Bon Accord | - | 1^{*} | 1^{*} |
| Calgary | - | 5 | 5 |
| Edmonton | - | 9 | 12 |
| Edmonton West | - | 1 | 1 |
| Lakeland | - | 1 | 1 |
| Lethbridge | - | 4 | 4 |
| Medicine Hat | - | 1 | 1 |
| Palliser-Foothills | - | 1 | 1 |
| St. Albert | - | 1 | 1 |
| St. Paul | - | 1 | 1 |
| Sturgeon | - | 1^{*} | 1^{*} |
| Total senators | | | 49^{*} |

^{1} Senator Nicholas Taylor changed from Bon Accord to Sturgeon.

British Columbia self-designated divisions
| Division | # Current | # Historical | Total |
|---|---|---|---|
| British Columbia | 2 | 2 | 4 |
| Vancouver | 1 | 4 | 5 |
| Vancouver South | 1 | 2 | 3 |
| Langley-Pemberton-Whistler | 1 | - | 1 |
| Okanagan-Similkameen | 1 | - | 1 |
| Victoria | - | 4 | 4 |
| New Westminster | - | 3 | 3 |
| Ashcroft | - | 2 | 2 |
| Cariboo | - | 2 | 2 |
| Kamloops | - | 2 | 2 |
| Barkerville | - | 1 | 1 |
| Burrard | - | 1 | 1 |
| Kamloops-Cariboo | - | 1 | 1 |
| Kootenay | - | 1 | 1 |
| Kootenay East | - | 1 | 1 |
| Lion's Gate | - | 1 | 1 |
| Nanaimo | - | 1 | 1 |
| Nanaimo-Malaspina | - | 1 | 1 |
| North Shore-Burnaby | - | 1 | 1 |
| Richmond | - | 1 | 1 |
| University-Point Grey | - | 1 | 1 |
| Vancouver-Burrard | - | 1 | 1 |
| Vancouver-Centre | - | 1 | 1 |
| Vancouver-Point Grey | - | 1 | 1 |
| Total senators | | | 41 |

Saskatchewan self-designated divisions
| Division | # Current | # Historical | Total |
|---|---|---|---|
| Saskatchewan | 4 | 5 | 9 |
| Regina | 1 | 5 | 6 |
| North Battleford | 1 | - | 1 |
| Prince Albert | - | 3 | 3 |
| Moose Jaw | - | 2 | 2 |
| Saskatoon | - | 2 | 2 |
| Assiniboia | - | 1 | 1 |
| Central Saskatchewan | - | 1 | 1 |
| Lumsden | - | 1 | 1 |
| Moosimin | - | 1 | 1 |
| Ponteix | - | 1 | 1 |
| Prince Albert-Duck Lake | - | 1 | 1 |
| Regina-Qu'Appelle | - | 1 | 1 |
| Rosetown | - | 1 | 1 |
| Saskatchewan North | - | 1 | 1 |
| Tantallon | - | 1 | 1 |
| Wolseley | - | 1 | 1 |
| Total senators | | | 34 |

Manitoba self-designated divisions
| Division | # Current | # Historical | Total |
|---|---|---|---|
| Manitoba | 3 | 4 | 7 |
| Winnipeg | 1 | 6 | 7 |
| Red River | 1 | 1 | 2 |
| Winnipeg-Interlake | 1 | - | 1 |
| St. Boniface | - | 5 | 5 |
| Provencher | - | 3 | 3 |
| Marquette | - | 2 | 2 |
| Selkirk | - | 2 | 2 |
| Brandon | - | 1 | 1 |
| Churchill | - | 1 | 1 |
| Fort Garry | - | 1 | 1 |
| Fort Rouge | - | 1 | 1 |
| Killarney | - | 1 | 1 |
| Kildonan | - | 1 | 1 |
| Lisgar | - | 1 | 1 |
| Manitou | - | 1 | 1 |
| Portage la Prairie | - | 1 | 1 |
| River Heights | - | 1 | 1 |
| Souris | - | 1 | 1 |
| St. Rose | - | 1 | 1 |
| Winnipeg North | - | 1 | 1 |
| Winnipeg South | - | 1 | 1 |
| Total senators | | | 43 |

== The Maritimes regional division ==
The Maritimes regional division was created in 1867. At the time of Confederation the division contained only Nova Scotia and New Brunswick. It was expected that Prince Edward Island would also join; however, it held out until 1873 as it sought equal representation by province rather than by region. At the Quebec Conference of 1864 the Prince Edward Island representatives believed the only safeguard for a small province would be an equal representation in the Senate. Prince Edward Island held out joining Canada until 1873 and ended up accepting the four senate seats.

On June 5, 2006, New Brunswick Premier Bernard Lord announced his province's support for possible Senate elections to be held during the New Brunswick municipal election cycle, joining Alberta as the only province actively pursuing elected senators. Among his proposal was a plan to divide New Brunswick into five regions or divisions and have each represented by two senators. Another possibility of the proposal was to have senators remain at large for the province.

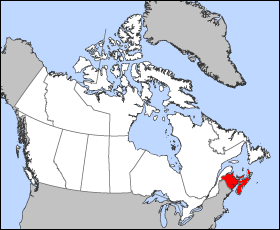
The Maritimes Regional division

New Brunswick self-designated divisions
| Division | # Current | # Historical | Total |
|---|---|---|---|
| New Brunswick | 6 | 12 | 18 |
| Fredericton-York-Sunbury | 1 | - | 1 |
| Saint John-Kennebecasis | 1 | - | 1 |
| St. Louis de Kent | 1 | - | 1 |
| Tracadie | 1 | - | 1 |
| St. John | - | 9 | 9 |
| L'Acadie | - | 4 | 4 |
| Westmorland | - | 4 | 4 |
| Fredericton | - | 3 | 3 |
| Gloucester | - | 3 | 3 |
| Chatham | - | 2 | 2 |
| Kent | - | 2 | 2 |
| Moncton | - | 2 | 2 |
| Northumberland | - | 2 | 2 |
| Northumberland-Miramichi | - | 2 | 2 |
| Royal | - | 2 | 2 |
| Sunbury | - | 2 | 2 |
| Victoria | - | 2 | 2 |
| Victoria-Carleton | - | 2 | 2 |
| Baie-du-Vin | - | 1 | 1 |
| Bathurst | - | 1 | 1 |
| Beauséjour | - | 1 | 1 |
| Charlotte | - | 1 | 1 |
| Charlotte County | - | 1 | 1 |
| Dorchester | - | 1 | 1 |
| Edmundston | - | 1 | 1 |
| Grand-Sault | - | 1 | 1 |
| Kings and Albert | - | 1 | 1 |
| L'Acadie-Acadia | - | 1 | 1 |
| Madawaska-Restigouche | - | 1 | 1 |
| Milltown | - | 1 | 1 |
| Nashwaak Valley | - | 1 | 1 |
| Queen's | - | 1 | 1 |
| Restigouche-Gloucester | - | 1 | 1 |
| Richibucto | - | 1 | 1 |
| Riverview | - | 1 | 1 |
| Rockwood | - | 1 | 1 |
| Rothesay | - | 1 | 1 |
| St. John-Albert | - | 1 | 1 |
| St. George | - | 1 | 1 |
| St. John City | - | 1 | 1 |
| St. John (Lancaster) | - | 1 | 1 |
| Shediac | - | 1 | 1 |
| Southern New Brunswick | - | 1 | 1 |
| Village of Cap-Pelé | - | 1 | 1 |
| York | - | 1 | 1 |
| Total senators | | | 90 |
| Vacant Seats | | | 0 |

Nova Scotia self-designated divisions
| Division | # Current | # Historical | Total |
|---|---|---|---|
| Nova Scotia | 4 | 14 | 18 |
| Halifax | 1 | 10 | 11 |
| Northend Halifax | 1 | - | 1 |
| Stanhope St./Bluenose | 1 | - | 1 |
| South Shore | 1 | - | 1 |
| Amherst | - | 4 | 4 |
| Cape Breton | - | 4 | 4 |
| Pictou | - | 4 | 4 |
| Colchester | - | 3 | 3 |
| Lunenburg | - | 3 | 3 |
| Antigonish-Guysborough | - | 2 | 2 |
| Halifax-Dartmouth | - | 2 | 2 |
| King's | - | 2 | 2 |
| New Glasgow | - | 2 | 2 |
| North Sydney | - | 2 | 2 |
| Yarmouth | - | 2 | 2 |
| Antigonish | - | 1 | 1 |
| Bedford-Halifax | - | 1 | 1 |
| Cape Breton-The Sydneys | - | 1 | 1 |
| Clare | - | 1 | 1 |
| Colchester-Cumberland | - | 1 | 1 |
| Colchester-Hants | - | 1 | 1 |
| Cumberland | - | 1 | 1 |
| Dartmouth/Eastern Shore | - | 1 | 1 |
| Digby-Clare | - | 1 | 1 |
| Digby County | - | 1 | 1 |
| Halifax North | - | 1 | 1 |
| Highlands-Canso | - | 1 | 1 |
| Inverness-Richmond | - | 1 | 1 |
| Liverpool | - | 1 | 1 |
| Londonderry | - | 1 | 1 |
| Margaree Forks | - | 1 | 1 |
| Middleton | - | 1 | 1 |
| Milford-Hants | - | 1 | 1 |
| Queens-Lunenburg | - | 1 | 1 |
| Queens-Shelburne | - | 1 | 1 |
| Richmond | - | 1 | 1 |
| Richmond West-Cape Breton | - | 1 | 1 |
| Shelburne | - | 1 | 1 |
| South Western Nova | - | 1 | 1 |
| Sydney | - | 1 | 1 |
| Sydney Mines | - | 1 | 1 |
| The Annapolis Valley | - | 1 | 1 |
| The Highlands | - | 1 | 1 |
| Victoria | - | 1 | 1 |
| Wallace | - | 1 | 1 |
| Total senators | | | 94 |
| Vacant Seats | | | 2 |

Prince Edward Island self-designated divisions
| Division | # Current | # Historical | Total |
|---|---|---|---|
| Prince Edward Island | 2 | 6 | 8 |
| Charlottetown | 1 | 3 | 4 |
| Cavendish | 1 | - | 1 |
| Queen's | - | 4 | 4 |
| Prince | - | 3 | 3 |
| Cardigan | - | 2 | 2 |
| King's | - | 2 | 2 |
| Alberton | - | 1 | 1 |
| East Prince | - | 1 | 1 |
| Hillsborough | - | 1 | 1 |
| Montague | - | 1 | 1 |
| Mount Stewart | - | 1 | 1 |
| Murray Harbour | - | 1 | 1 |
| Murray River | - | 1 | 1 |
| Park Corner | - | 1 | 1 |
| St. Peter's, Kings County | - | 1 | 1 |
| Souris | - | 1 | 1 |
| Summerside | - | 1 | 1 |
| Tignish | - | 1 | 1 |
| Total senators | | | 34 |
| Vacant Seats | | | 0 |

== Newfoundland and Labrador ==
During the Quebec Conference of 1864 it was determined that Newfoundland and Labrador was a distinct region and that the territory should exist as an exception outside of the equal regional divisions, if it should enter Canada. When Newfoundland and Labrador entered Confederation in 1949 the Newfoundland Act confirmed the original terms of union and was given six seats in the Senate.

Map of Newfoundland and Labrador

Newfoundland & Labrador
| Division | # Current | # Historical | Total |
|---|---|---|---|
| Newfoundland and Labrador | 4 | 1 | 5 |
| North West River, Labrador | 1 | - | 1 |
| Bonavista | - | 2 | 2 |
| St. John's | - | 2 | 2 |
| St. John's East | - | 2 | 2 |
| Avalon | - | 1 | 1 |
| Burgeo-Lapoile | - | 1 | 1 |
| Burin | - | 1 | 1 |
| Bonavista-Twillingate | - | 1 | 1 |
| Harbour Main-Bell Island | - | 1 | 1 |
| Humber-St. George's-St. Barbe | - | 1 | 1 |
| Lewisporte | - | 1 | 1 |
| Newfoundland | - | 1 | 1 |
| St. Jacques | - | 1 | 1 |
| St. John's West | - | 1 | 1 |
| The Grand Banks | - | 1 | 1 |
| Waterford-Trinity | - | 1 | 1 |
| West Coast | - | 1 | 1 |
| Total senators | | | 25 |
| Vacant | | | 1 |

See List of Newfoundland and Labrador senators

== The territories ==
The Northwest Territories, Yukon and Nunavut are currently represented by one senator each. The Northwest Territories was admitted to Canada in 1870, but did not gain representation in the Senate until 1888. The territory was granted two more seats in 1903. After Alberta and Saskatchewan were created in 1905 the Northwest Territories lost representation in the Senate until 1975 when it regained one seat under the Constitution Act 1975 (No 2).

The Yukon was created out of the Northwest Territories in 1898 but did not get representation in the Senate until it was granted one seat under the Constitution Act 1975 (No 2).

Nunavut was granted one seat under the Constitution Act, 1999 (Nunavut) when the territory was created out of the Northwest Territories in 1999.

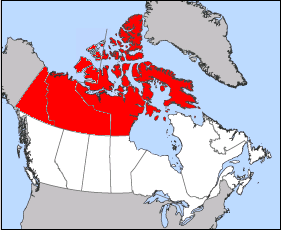
Map of the Territories

Canadian territories after 1975
| Division | # senators |
|---|---|
| Northwest Territories | 2^{*} |
| Nunavut | 1^{*} |
| Yukon | 2 |
| Total senators | 4/5 |

Northwest Territories prior to 1905
| Division | # senators |
|---|---|
| Calgary | 1 |
| Edmonton | 1 |
| Prince Albert | 1 |
| Regina | 1 |
| Wolseley | 1 |
| Total senators | 5 |

Note:

- * Senator Willie Adams' designation changed from "Northwest Territories" to "Nunavut" when Nunavut Territory was created in 1999.
- All Northwest Territories senators became part of Alberta and Saskatchewan after 1905.

See List of Canadian territorial senators

Constitution Act, 1886
