= 2004 Alberta Senate nominee election =

Canadian election

- November 22, 2004

4 persons to become senators-in-waiting
- Turnout: 44.2%
	First party	Second party
Candidate	Bert Brown	Betty Unger
Party	Progressive Conservative	Progressive Conservative
Popular vote	312,041	311,964
Percentage	14.3%	14.3%
Appointed	July 10, 2007	January 6, 2012
	Third party	Fourth party
Candidate	Cliff Breitkreuz	Link Byfield
Party	Progressive Conservative	Independent
Popular vote	241,306	238,751
Percentage	11.1%	11.0%
Appointed	Not appointed	Not appointed (Note: Resigned in November 2010)

The 2004 Alberta Senate nominee election, formally the 3rd Alberta Senate nominee election of Alberta was held on November 22, 2004, to nominate appointments to the Senate of Canada. The Senate nominee election was held in conjunction with the 2004 Alberta general election.

The 3rd Senate nominee election took place six years following the 2nd Senate nominee election held in 1998, and 15 years after the first Senate nominee election held in 1989.

The election came five months following the 2004 Canadian federal election which saw the Liberal government secure a minority under new Prime Minister Paul Martin. Previous Liberal Prime Minister Jean Chrétien refused to appoint senators elected in Alberta in 1998. Previous Senate nominees from 1998 Bert Brown and Ted Morton, both of the Reform Party failed to be nominated before their five-year term expired. Brown, one of the four nominated senators was subsequently appointed to the Senate by Prime Minister Stephen Harper on July 10, 2007, and Betty Unger was appointed to the Senate on January 6, 2012, becoming the second and third elected senators in the upper chamber.

== Background ==
In the late-1980s, the Government of Alberta under Premier Don Getty had made vailed statements about holding a province-wide election to select nominees for the Senate with the expectation that Meech Lake Accord would be ratified and the Prime Minister would make appointments to the Senate on the basis of names submitted by each province's premier. The Senate nominee election was featured in the Speech from the Throne in February 1989 for the fourth session of the 21st Alberta Legislature, but died on the order paper when the legislature was dissolved to hold an early provincial election. The bill was reintroduced in the summer of 1989 during the 22nd Alberta Legislature, which permitted the vote to take place during the October 1989 Alberta municipal elections.

Stan Waters, nominated by the Reform Party, won the 1989 Senate nominee election, with 41.7 per cent of the popular vote. On October 17, 1989, one day after the Senate nominee election, Mulroney stated he was not bound to appoint a senator by the results of the election, and instead intended to follow the process in the Meech Lake Accord. Getty responded to the comments by Mulroney by stating he would provide a list to the Prime Minister with a single name, Waters. Prime Minister Brian Mulroney had criticized the electoral process, although he nonetheless made a public announcement agreeing to advise Governor General Ray Hnatyshyn to appoint Waters to the Canadian Senate on June 11, 1990.

Waters time in the Senate was cut short when he was diagnosed with brain Cancer in the Summer of 1991, and died months later in Calgary on September 25, 1991, at the age of 71, four years before the mandatory retirement age for Canadian senators.

Prime Minister Jean Chrétien appointed four senators from Alberta prior to the 1998 Alberta Senate nominee election, including Nicholas Taylor on March 7, 1996, Jean Forest on May 17, 1996, Thelma Chalifoux on November 26, 1997, and Douglas Roche. Roche, a former Member of Parliament for the Progressive Conservative Party was appointed to the Senate on September 17, 1998, one month before the 1998 Alberta Senate nominee election was held. Former Prime Minister Joe Clark criticized the appointment as a "cynical, provocative and wrong". Alberta Premier Ralph Klein penned an open letter to Chrétien criticizing the appointment and calling for Senate reform. Klein went on to criticize Chrétien stating "the prime minister of this country is saying that democracy is a joke".

=== Candidates ===
Both of Alberta's opposition parties, the Liberal Party and the New Democratic Party (NDP), boycotted the election in demonstration of their opposition to the process. As a result, the only candidates to contest the election were representatives of the right-of-centre Alberta Progressive Conservatives, Alberta Alliance Party and Social Credit parties, and a number of independents. After pressure from the Liberal and NDP camps (who did not want their supporters to feel compelled to vote for a right-of-centre candidate), polling officers were instructed to advise voters on election day that they did not have to vote in the Senate election.

In early October, Progressive Conservative Premier Ralph Klein promised that the Progressive Conservative Party would not run a candidate in the Senate nominee election, which he reversed after pressure from caucus. Klein's rationale for the boycott was that the Senate was a "federal thing". Five candidates were nominated from the Progressive Conservative Party, including the 1998 Senate election winner Bert Brown. The second nominee from the 1998 election, Ted Morton declined to run, and instead contested a seat in the Legislative Assembly as a Progressive Conservative. The other Progressive Conservative candidates were Betty Unger, a home-care nurse and conservative party supporter; Cliff Breitkreuz, a farmer and former Reform and Alliance Member of Parliament for Yellowhead; Jim Silye, President of an oil exploration company and former Calgary Stampeders player; and David Usherwood, a farmer and financial advisor.

Three candidates were nominated under the Alberta Alliance Party, including Michael Roth, a small business owner from Lacombe; Vance Gough a Calgary entrepreneur and business instructor at Mount Royal University who previously finished fourth of four candidates in 1998; and Gary Horan, a small business owner from Edmonton.

Two independent candidates contested the election, Link Byfield, the former publisher of Alberta Report and western rights advocate; and Tom Sindlinger, an economist and former Member of the Legislative Assembly for Calgary-Buffalo.

The Social Credit party attempted to nominate Gerry Pyne of Calgary, but were unable to obtain the 1,500 signatures required to get on the ballot, and the party therefore was not represented in the election.

As of the date of the election, there were three vacant Alberta seats in the Senate of Canada, with another set to become vacant within six years. Voters could vote for up to four candidates, though many candidates encouraged their supporters to vote for only one, a legal option, to prevent the vote totals of their competitors from rising.

A total of 2,176,341 votes were cast (714,709 ballots).

== Aftermath ==
Overall, Albertans were seen as uninterested in the Provincial election and Senate nominee election. Elections Alberta stated the provincial election turnout was 44.7 per cent of eligible voters, while the Senate nominee election saw a turnout of 44.2 per cent (885,289 ballots). Although total turnout included 85,937 (9.7 per cent) voters decline ballots, and 84,643 (9.6 per cent) voters rejecting their ballot. (Note: Rejected ballots are those not counted because the elector’s intent was unclear, or because no candidates or more than four candidates were selected, or because readily identifying marks were added. A declined ballot is one that was returned by an elector, who chose not to vote for any candidate listed on the ballot.) Commentators such as the Edmonton Journal editorial board called the large number of declined and rejected ballots a grim picture for Alberta's senator-in-waiting strategy for reform. Many Liberal and NDP supporters were observed discarding their Senate nominee ballots, while the proportion of spoiled ballots was higher in ridings and polls where the Liberals and NDP did well in the concurrent Legislature election.

The Klein government sent the four senators-in-waiting on a cross-country trip following the election in Spring 2005 to promote Senate reform, although Klein refused to give the group of nominees the opportunity to speak at the August 2005 Council of the Federation meeting in Banff.

Prime Minister Paul Martin refused to advise Governor General Adrienne Clarkson to appoint the elected Senate nominees to the Upper Chamber, instead putting forward three appointees of his choosing: Grant Mitchell, Elaine McCoy and Claudette Tardif on March 24, 2005. After the announcement, Breitkreuz publicly admonished Klein for his perceived failure to advocate for Alberta's senators-in-waiting.

On April 19, 2007, on the advice of newly elected Conservative Prime Minister Stephen Harper, Governor General Michäelle Jean appointed Bert Brown to the Senate to fill the vacancy left by Daniel Hays' early retirement.

Alberta Premier Ed Stelmach decided to defer new Senate elections set to take place when the terms of senators-in-waiting ended, which was controversial. Senator-in-waiting Link Byfield decided to resign as he felt he lacked a mandate. Remaining candidates Breitkreuz and Unger both accepted the term extension. Unger was appointed to the Senate on January 6, 2012, after the mandatory retirement of Tommy Banks.

== Results ==
Candidate	Party	Votes #	Votes %	Ballots %	Elected	Appointed
Bert Brown	Progressive Conservative	312,041	14.3%	43.7%	✓	July 10, 2007
Betty Unger	Progressive Conservative	311,964	14.3%	43.6%	✓	January 6, 2012
Cliff Breitkreuz	Progressive Conservative	241,306	11.1%	33.8%	✓	Term ended March 26, 2012
Link Byfield	Independent	238,751	11.0%	33.4%	✓	Resigned November 2010
Jim Silye	Progressive Conservative	217,857	10.0%	30.5%		
David Usherwood	Progressive Conservative	193,056	8.9%	27.0%		
Michael Roth	Alberta Alliance	176,339	8.1%	24.7%		
Vance Gough	Alberta Alliance	167,770	7.7%	23.5%		
Tom Sindlinger	Independent	161,082	7.4%	22.5%		
Gary Horan	Alberta Alliance	156,175	7.2%	21.9%		

Source: Elections Alberta

Note:

- For results by district please see districts listed in the 2004 Alberta general election.
