= Reform Party of Alberta =

The Reform Party of Alberta may refer to two unrelated right-wing political parties in Alberta:

- Reform Party of Alberta (1989–2004), a party that did not contest general elections, but existed to nominate candidates in Alberta Senate nominee elections for the Reform Party of Canada
- Reform Party of Alberta (2016–present), a socially conservative political party founded by Randy Thorsteinson in 2016
