= 2021 Alberta Senate nominee election =

Canadian election

- October 18, 2021

3 persons to become senators-in-waiting
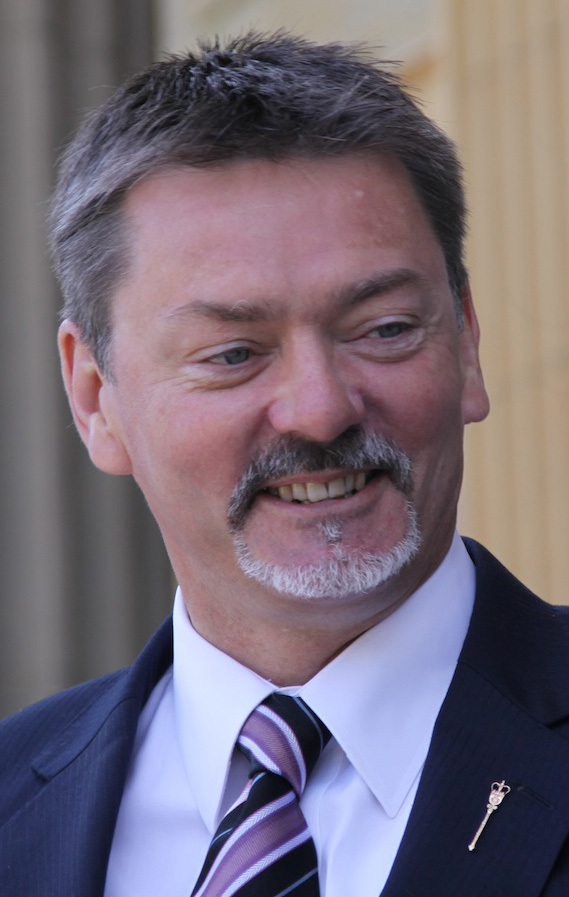
	First party	Second party	Third party
	P.D.	E.B.	M.M.
Candidate	Pam Davidson	Erika Barootes	Mykhailo Martyniouk
Party	Conservative	Conservative	Conservative
Popular vote	382,243	358,002	237,228
Percentage	18.2%	17.1%	11.3%
	Fourth party	Fifth party	Sixth party
		K.P.	D.K.
Candidate	Doug Horner	Karina Pillay	Duncan Kinney
Party	Independent	Independent	Independent
Popular vote	179,455	144,168	128,945
Percentage	8.6%	6.9%	6.2%
	Seventh party	Eighth party
	A.M.	K.L.
Candidate	Ann McCormack	Kelly Lorencz
Party	People's	People's
Popular vote	109,812	107,176
Percentage	5.2%	5.1%

The 2021 Alberta Senate nominee election, formally the 5th Senate Nominee Election, was held in Alberta to help select (non-binding) nominees for appointment to represent Alberta in the Senate of Canada. The Senate election was held on October 18 in conjunction with the 2021 Alberta municipal elections. As of December 2025, none of the candidates selected in this election have been nominated to the Senate.

== Background ==
Alberta is the only province to hold elections for nominees to the Senate. These elections, held under Alberta's Senate Election Act, are not binding on the prime minister when he advises the governor general on appointments to the Senate. However, in the previous four senate elections, nine senate nominees have been selected; and, of these, five were appointed to the Senate of Canada.

The act also establishes that the number of Senate nominees is to be set by the Lieutenant Governor-in-Council when issuing the order in council. The current order in council sets the number of senate candidates to be selected as three.

=== Candidacy requirements ===
To be eligible to run as a senate candidate, a person had to be qualified under Section 23 of the Constitution Act (1867) and under Section 7 of the Alberta Senate Election Act. The prospective senate candidate also had to determine if they would be endorsed by a registered provincial party in Alberta or aligned with a federal party in Canada. Eligible, prospective senate candidates had to register under the Elections Finances and Contributions Disclosure Act prior to collecting their nomination signatures. Additionally, signatures could only be collected from between the date of the writ of election and nomination day, with candidates collecting at least 500 valid signatures, from eligible voters, in order to be placed on the ballot. Lastly, a $4,000 deposit had to be provided to Elections Alberta, before September 20, to become a fully nominated candidate.

=== Senate vacancies ===
The Alberta Senate Nominee Election will select three candidates, that may be chosen by the prime minister to fill the current single vacancy in the Senate:

- Senator Grant Mitchell resigned from the Senate on April 24, 2020.
- Senator Elaine McCoy died in December 2020.
- Karen Sorenson was appointed to the Senate on July 29, 2021, filling one of the two vacancies.

== Electoral system ==
The election used block voting, to elect three Senate nominees.

== Prospective candidates ==
As of September 16, 2021, several prospective senate candidates had filed nomination papers with Elections Alberta. There were enough prospective candidates nominated that the ballot was not acclaimed.

Prospective Senate candidates
Candidate name	Provincial affiliation	Federal alignment	Registration date	Nomination accepted	On ballot
Rick Bonnett	Independent	Independent	September 17, 2021	September 17, 2021	Yes
Erika Barootes	Independent	Conservative Party of Canada	June 15, 2021	September 14, 2021	Yes
Pam Davidson	Independent	Conservative Party of Canada	June 30, 2021	September 15, 2021	Yes
Mykhailo Martyniouk	Independent	Conservative Party of Canada	August 5, 2021	September 10, 2021	Yes
Karina Pillay	Independent	Independent	September 14, 2021	September 15, 2021	Yes
Chad Jett Thunders Saunders	Independent	Independent	August 31, 2021	September 3, 2021	Yes
Sunil Sookram	Independent	Independent	July 20, 2021	August 19, 2021	Yes
Randy Hogle	N/A	N/A	July 28, 2021	N/A (withdrew)	No
Doug A. Horner	Independent	Independent	September 10, 2021	September 20, 2021	Yes
Duncan Kinney	Independent	Independent	April 14, 2021	September 16, 2021	Yes
Jeff Nielsen	Independent	Independent	August 23, 2021	September 16, 2021	Yes
Nadine R. Wellwood	Independent	People's Party of Canada	September 20, 2021	September 20, 2021	Yes
Ann McCormack	Independent	People's Party of Canada	September 20, 2021	September 20, 2021	Yes
Kelly Lorencz	Independent	People's Party of Canada	September 20, 2021	September 20, 2021	Yes

== Results ==
=== By candidate ===
No candidate received votes from a majority of the 1.1M voters who voted.

The most popular candidate received votes from less than 38 per cent of the voters.

As is often the case with block voting, one party took all the seats.

Official poll results as per report posted by Elections Alberta:

Candidate	Party	Votes #	Votes %	Valid Ballots %	Elected	Appointed
Pam Davidson	Conservative	382,243	18.22%	54.56%	✓	
Erika Barootes	Conservative	358,002	17.06%	51.10%	✓	
Mykhailo Martyniouk	Conservative	237,228	11.31%	33.86%	✓	
Doug Horner	Independent	179,455	8.55%	25.61%		
Karina Pillay	Independent	144,168	6.87%	20.58%		
Duncan Kinney	Independent	128,945	6.15%	18.40%		
Ann McCormack	People's	109,812	5.23%	15.67%		
Kelly Lorencz	People's	107,176	5.11%	15.30%		
Nadine Wellwood	People's	98,401	4.69%	14.04%		
Jeff Nielsen	Independent	95,768	4.56%	13.67%		
Rick Bonnett	Independent	93,277	4.45%	13.31%		
Sunil Sookram	Independent	87,932	4.19%	12.55%		
Chad Jett Thunders Saunders	Independent	75,514	3.60%	10.78%		
Total		2,097,921		700,625		
Rejected, Spoiled and Declined		418,203				
Total Ballots Cast		1,118,828				

=== By party ===
Affiliation		Seats	Total votes	Votes %
	Conservative	3	977,473	46.59%
	Independent	0	805,059	38.37%
	People's	0	315,389	15.03%
Total		3	2,097,921	100.00%

Vote share
Conservative	46.59%
PPC	15.03%
Others	38.37%

Senate Nominees
Conservative	100.00%

== See also ==
- Alberta Senate nominee elections
- Elections Alberta
