= Triple-E Senate =

Proposed reform of the Canadian Senate

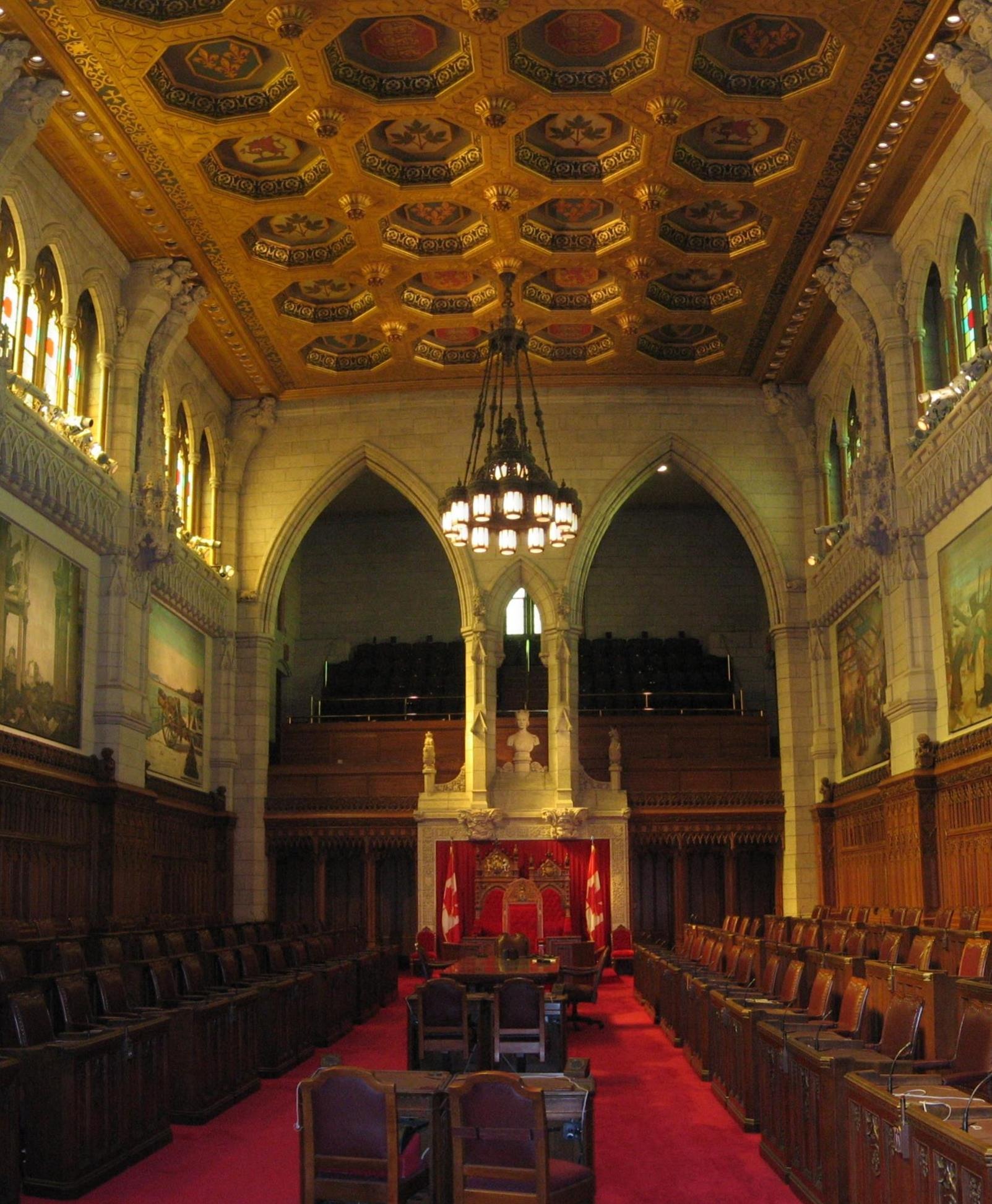
The Canadian Senate chamber, within the Centre Block on Parliament Hill.

The Triple-E Senate (a mnemonic contrived acronym for equal, elected, and effective) is a proposed reform of the Canadian Senate, calling for senators to be elected to exercise effective powers in numbers equally representative of each province. This is in contrast to the present arrangement wherein individuals are appointed to the Senate by the Governor General, on the advice of the Prime Minister, after which they generally do not interfere with the workings of the Lower House. The number of senators allotted to each province, as set out in the constitution, is neither equal nor proportional.

A Westminster style upper chamber that already possesses characteristics similar to the proposed Triple-E Senate is the Australian Senate, which has stood as such since Australian federation in 1901.

The phrase "triple-E Senate" was coined by Alberta Report editor and conservative commentator Ted Byfield in a column for the Report titled "A triple-E plan to make Ottawa ours, not theirs". His son Link Byfield was once a candidate to be a Senator for Alberta.

== Origins ==
Reform of the Senate has been a debated issue in Canada since the institution was formed at Confederation in 1867, carrying on discussions around the Legislative Council of the Province of Canada since the 1830s. In September 1885, at a Liberal Party of Canada convention in Toronto, a policy resolution was put forward to reform the Canadian Senate on an elective basis; a policy that was adopted, but never implemented. The little debate that followed in the decades thereafter focused on reform of the appointment process or abolition.

It was not until the premiership of Pierre Trudeau that the idea of a Triple-E Senate attracted mainstream attention, after the Liberal dominated federal parliament passed legislation establishing the National Energy Program (NEP) in the wake of the energy crisis of the 1970s. Though it was welcome in the populous eastern provinces, the NEP was unpopular in the western region—especially oil-rich Alberta—where populists felt the western provinces had been excluded from debate on the energy program, and looked towards the United States with the belief that, had Canada's Senate been more like its American counterpart, senators from the four western provinces could have forced the Senate to drop the program, or at least allow for significant amendments to it.

This idea of electing senators to a house made up of equally distributed seats and which could exercise its considerable power over legislation passed by the House of Commons soon became a cause célèbre among Western activists, with one Alberta farmer—Bert Brown—even using his tractor to cut "Triple E Senate or else" into his neighbour's barley field. By 1987, the Legislative Assembly of Alberta had passed the Senatorial Selection Act, and the first senatorial election was held on October 16, 1989. Stanley Waters, a member of the western-based, right-wing Reform Party, was the winner of that election, and, under pressure from the Reform Party and the Premier of Alberta, Prime Minister Brian Mulroney agreed to advise the Governor General to appoint the Alberta nominee to the Senate; Waters was sworn in as a senator on June 11, 1990.

== Charlottetown Accord ==
During the debate over the ultimately failed Charlottetown Accord, citizens' forums put Senate reform near the top of their lists of desired changes, leading then Constitutional Affairs Minister Joe Clark to include within his original constitutional reform package a Senate with six senators for each province and one from each territory, and a proportional representation (PR) system to elect them. Also proposed were Senate seats reserved specifically for First Nations representatives, as had been done similarly in New Zealand. However, at the same time, the Senate's powers would be reduced and more Commons seats for the populous provinces would be added to that chamber, to justify the equality of the Senate. During later negotiations, the provincial premiers demanded that PR be dropped, asking instead for the responsibility of providing senators to fall on the provinces, where senators could be selected by the legislative assemblies or through popular election. Along with the other provisions of the Charlottetown Accord, this Senate reform proposal was not met with enthusiasm in the west, and, in the required national referendum held in 1992, the accord was defeated in the four western provinces.

In the wake of this failure, the aforementioned Reform Party came to prominence in Alberta, and soon gained considerable political support there. The party and its leader, Preston Manning, became the most vocal advocates of a Triple-E Senate, promoting a plan with ten senators for each province.

== Further developments ==
The notion of a Triple-E Senate remained alive in the decades following the Charlottetown Accord, though little substantial action was taken to implement the principles; Prime Minister Paul Martin mused on the topic, but said "piecemeal" Senate reform would create an unworkable combination of appointed and elected senators.

While the Conservative Party of Canada has endorsed an elected Senate, it has rejected the Triple-E label. However, Conservative Prime Minister Stephen Harper requested in September 2007 that Governor General Michaëlle Jean appoint the aforementioned Bert Brown—who had won two Alberta senatorial nomination elections—to the Senate.

Then, on December 11, 2008, without any preceding senatorial elections as in the case of Bert Brown, the Toronto Star reported that Harper "plans to fill every empty Senate seat by the end of the year to kill any chance of a Liberal–NDP coalition government filling the vacancies next year." On December 22, 2008, The Globe and Mail reported that "Prime Minister Stephen Harper confirmed ... that he is filling all 18 current vacancies."

The New Democratic Party and the Bloc Québécois both called for the Senate's abolition.

== See also ==
- Reference Re Senate Reform
- Perfect bicameralism
- Semi-parliamentary system
