= Ted Morton =

Canadian politician (born 1949)

The Honourable Ted Morton ECA
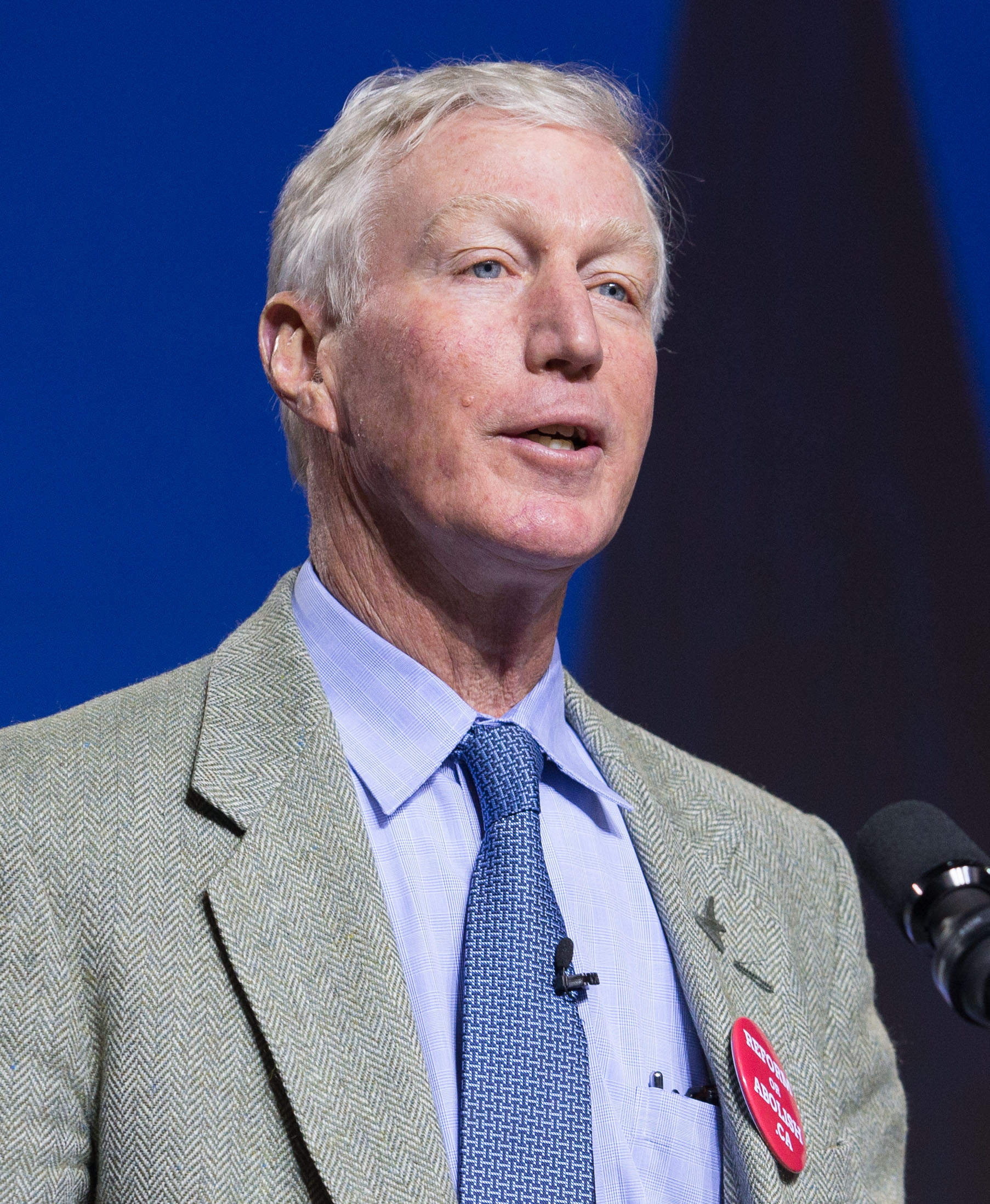
- Morton in 2014

Minister of Energy
- In office October 12, 2011 – May 8, 2012
- Premier: Alison Redford
- Preceded by: Ron Liepert
- Succeeded by: Ken Hughes

Minister of Finance and Enterprise
- In office January 15, 2010 – January 27, 2011
- Premier: Ed Stelmach
- Preceded by: Iris Evans
- Succeeded by: Lloyd Snelgrove

Minister of Sustainable Resource Development
- In office December 15, 2006 – January 15, 2010
- Premier: Ed Stelmach
- Preceded by: David Coutts
- Succeeded by: Mel Knight

Member of the Legislative Assembly of Alberta for Foothills-Rocky View
- In office November 22, 2004 – April 23, 2012
- Preceded by: Riding established
- Succeeded by: Riding abolished

Personal details
- Born: Frederick Lee Morton; March 28, 1949 (age 77) Los Angeles, California, U.S.
- Party: Progressive Conservative
- Other political affiliations: Reform Party of Alberta (1998); Canadian Alliance (2001)
- Spouse: Patricia
- Parents: Katharine Allen Morton; Warren A. Morton

Academic background
- Thesis: Sexual Equality and the Family in the United States Supreme Court (1981)

Academic work
- Discipline: Political science
- School or tradition: Calgary School
- Institutions: University of Calgary
- Doctoral students: Ian Brodie

Frederick Lee Morton ECA (born 1949), known commonly as Ted Morton, is an American-Canadian politician and former cabinet minister in the Alberta government. As a member of the Legislative Assembly of Alberta, he represented the constituency of Foothills-Rocky View as a Progressive Conservative from 2004 to 2012 (in the 26th and 27th Alberta Legislative Assemblies). He did not win reelection in the 2012 Alberta general election. Morton was a candidate for the leadership of the Progressive Conservative Association in its 2006 and 2011 leadership elections. Morton is currently Professor Emeritus of Political Science at the University of Calgary.

== Personal life ==
Morton was born in Los Angeles on March 28, 1949. In 1952, Morton moved with his parents to Casper, Wyoming. Morton moved to Canada in 1981 and became a Canadian citizen in 1991. He received dual citizenship in 1993. Morton and his wife Patricia have three children.

== Political views ==
In 2001 Ted Morton (who at the time was considered by some to be an "Alberta Senator-elect" despite that status not being legally recognized), Stephen Harper (then-President of the National Citizens’ Coalition), Tom Flanagan, and Ken Boessenkool, (Chief of Staff to Premier Christy Clark's) sent a letter to Alberta's former Premier Ralph Klein, now known as the "Firewall Letter", in which they called for Alberta to exercise its constitutional provincial powers including: "withdrawal from the Canada Pension Plan, ending the provincial contract with the RCMP, a provincial take-over of health care decision-making, and collecting revenue for the province from income tax" in order to "limit the extent to which an aggressive and hostile federal government can encroach on legitimate provincial jurisdiction."

== Academic career ==
Morton obtained his Bachelor of Arts degree from Colorado College and earned his Master of Arts and Doctor of Philosophy degrees in political economy from the University of Toronto. During his time in college, Morton was involved in protests against the Vietnam War. In 1981, Morton joined the faculty of the University of Calgary as a political science professor.

He has published several books, often focusing on criticisms of the role of the judiciary and Charter of Rights jurisprudence, including The Charter Revolution and the Court Party co-authored with Rainer Knopff in 2000, Morgentaler v. Borowski: Abortion, the Charter and the Courts (1992, winner of the 1993 Writer Guild of Alberta's Wilfred Eggleston Award for Non-Fiction, and Law, politics, and the Judicial Process in Canada (1984). Morton has published more than fifty scholarly articles and his columns have appeared in the National Post, the Calgary Herald, The Globe and Mail and the Calgary Sun.

According to Morton and Knopff, the Canadian Charter of Rights and Freedoms allows interest groups to use litigation and mass media to avoid the democratic process and achieve their own ends. In The Charter Revolution, Morton embraced the practice of judicial restraint, claiming that the Charter has become a political instrument and that the locus of policy should move away from activist courts back to elected officials. Much of the analysis is devoted to questions of symbolism and ideology that were embedded in the Charter's introduction. By changing both the symbolic framework and the institutional structures of Canadian politics, the Charter of Rights has permanently altered the way Canadians organize their political life.

=== Calgary School ===
By the late 1990s, Morton along with conservatively inclined University of Calgary colleagues (many of whom were also in the Political Science Department) Tom Flanagan, Barry F. Cooper, Rainer Knopff, Roger Gibbins and history professor David Bercuson, became known as the Calgary School, a phrase coined by Johns Hopkins University political science professor David Rovinsky, Morton is "pro-life, anti-gay-marriage, anti-deficit at all costs and open to more private health care." in a 1998 The Center for Strategic and International Studies (CSIS) paper. At that time Western Canada was of heightened importance to Americans, not only for its increasing political weight but also because of its population and economic growth. The Washington, DC–based (CSIS) was investigating Western Canada's increasing weight in forming Canadian national public policy. (Note: "There are tensions between the socially conservative and economically conservative factions within the school. Bercuson publicly criticized Morton's social policies, saying "[they] were hard to stomach for a libertarian." (McLean, Archie. "Morton would use Alberta as his 'guinea pig': Social, religious views will drive policy, expert says", Edmonton Journal, 2 December 2006.) Such division brings into question whether its members reflect a coherent "school" of thought (Wikipedia article on Calgary School).")

By 1998, CSIS, a public policy research institution based in Washington, DC had already observed the ascendancy of the role of Calgary-based academics on Canadian public policy, specifically the Calgary School of political science.

In his December 2010 letter entitled, "Advice to progressives from the Calgary School", Tom Flanagan cited Knopff and Morton as examples of academics who "tackle controversial topics that people care about": "In The Court Party, Knopff and Morton took on judicial activism [...] All these books were widely discussed in the media and have had some impact on the course of public affairs."

== Political career ==
Morton was elected as a Reform Party senator-in-waiting in the 1998 Alberta Senate nominee election.

In 2001, Canadian Alliance leader Stockwell Day appointed him Parliamentary Director of Policy and Research for the party. That same year, he was one of a group of six Albertans (including Stephen Harper—later to become prime minister in 2006) who authored the "Alberta Agenda," also known as the Firewall Letter, a manifesto that called on the government of Alberta to use all of its constitutional powers to reduce the influence of the Federal government in the province, including the creation of a provincial police force to replace the Royal Canadian Mounted Police and withdrawal from the Canada Pension Plan in favour of a provincial pension plan.

=== MLA for Foothills-Rocky View ===
In the 2004 Alberta general election, Morton won the newly created seat of Foothills-Rocky View and now sits as an MLA for the Progressive Conservatives. In that role, he has advocated for tax cuts, for increased saving of energy revenues, for a lobbyist registry, for fixed election dates, against the 2005 Prosperity Bonus, and against same-sex marriage. He introduced Bill 208 (2006), which would have legislated protections for individuals who oppose gay marriage, allowed provincial marriage commissioners to refuse to perform same-sex marriages, and added an opt-out clause for students and teachers where same-sex marriage is included in the curriculum. This Bill was criticized by some public figures as legalizing discrimination against gays and lesbians, and failed to come to a vote due to procedural tactics employed by opposition members.

=== PC leadership candidate, 2006 ===
As a candidate in the 2006 PC leadership election to replace Ralph Klein, Morton placed second to front runner Jim Dinning on the first ballot, and third behind Dinning and winner Ed Stelmach on the second ballot. His platform included implementing the components of the Firewall Letter, opposing judicial activism, implementing the provision of Bill 208, introducing fixed election dates, lowering taxes and capping public spending growth, and introducing private health insurance and clinics.

=== Minister of Sustainable Resource Development ===
On December 15, 2006, Morton was named Minister of Sustainable Resource Development (SRD).

==== Métis Harvesting in Alberta policy, 2007 ====
In 2007 the Government of Alberta unilaterally cancelled the Interim Métis Harvesting Agreement. The SRD adopted a replacement policy which Morton contended complied with Métis hunting rights as set out in the Supreme Court of Canada's R v Powley decision.

In September 2011, CBC revealed that Norton had been using a "nom de plume" – his first and middle names – Frederick Lee – as "covert email" while serving as minister of Sustainable Resource Development (SRD).

According to a former ministry staff member who spoke with the CBC, the SRD's communications director explained at a July 2007 meeting, to SRD staff that Morton used the email address "when he didn't want people to know it was him doing the writing." In a November 15, 2008 email, "Frederick Lee" directed his SRD staff to revise legislation relating to the potential land rights of Métis people. Morton explained in the email that, "'Metis settlements' have never been considered 'private lands' in the conventional sense of the term in Alberta, and now is not the time to start ... If the Metis settlements suddenly want to share in some of the potential benefits of private land ownership, do they also want to be subject to all the other restrictions and duties that attach to private land ownership in Alberta? I doubt it. They cannot have their cake and eat it too."

Métis Nation of Alberta (MNA) said that the 2007 policy is a violation of their constitutional harvesting rights. In 2018, the Government of Alberta and the MNA are reviewing the policy collaboratively to advance reconciliation.

==== Alberta Land Stewardship Act, 2009 ====
In this position, Morton developed a land use framework in 2008

According to the CBC 2011 investigation of Morton "covert" email, he used his "nom de plume" when he was working with SRD staff on "new land-use legislation that subsequently caused many rural Albertans to question whether their private land rights had been undermined".

==== 2008 ====
Morton also introduced an online licensing system and community website for fishing and hunting, and expanded youth hunting opportunities by allowing Sunday hunting and introducing an official Provincial Hunting Day and Waterfowler Heritage Days. He also oversaw the opening of the Bow Habitat Station, an aquatic ecosystem interpretive centre that promotes the education of stewardship to youth.

=== Minister of Finance ===
On January 15, 2010, Morton was sworn in as minister of finance and enterprise by Premier Ed Stelmach in a major cabinet shuffle. In this position, Morton discussed plans for dealing with Alberta's large deficit, criticized the Canada Health Transfer, and released a joint statement with Quebec Minister of Finances and Revenue Raymond Bachand opposing the creation of a federal securities regulator.

=== PC leadership candidate, 2011 ===
On January 27, 2011 he resigned his cabinet post as minister of finance to seek the leadership of the Alberta Progressive Conservative Party. His renewed leadership bid coupled with his 2006 support for bringing private health care into Alberta's public health care system has raised concerns by Friends of Medicare, and others about the negative consequences of American-style health care being brought to Alberta. He finished fourth out of six candidates on the ballot with 11.7% of the vote and was eliminated from the second round ballot.

=== Energy Minister ===
On October 12, 2011, he was sworn in as Energy Minister and served in that role until the provincial election that was called for April 23, 2012. He lost his seat in that election to Bruce McAllister of the Wildrose Party.

== After politics ==
Morton is currently an Executive-in-Residence at the School of Public Policy at the University of Calgary and Senior Fellow, Energy and Environment, at the Manning Foundation. He also serves on the Board of the Alberta Land Institute and was a member of the Board of Governors of the Council of Canadian Academies from 2013 to 2016. In 2017, he received a Lifetime Achievement Award from the Institute for American Universities in Aix-en-Provence, France, where he was student in 1969-70.

In 2018, the Canadian Taxpayers Federation gave its annual TaxFighter Award to "the Calgary School", Barry Cooper, Tom Flanagan, Rainer Knopff and Ted Morton at the Calgary Petroleum Club.

== Alberta separatism, 2018 ==
In 2018, Ted Morton said that while he did not support Alberta leaving Canada, "the status quo is just as unacceptable...And if the powers-that-be refuse to address the status quo then the case for separation, of course, becomes stronger. The failure of Ottawa and other provinces to address this issue is going to push more and more Albertans to the separation option, which would be unfortunate because there are solutions in between....If you just isolate the economics, a separate Alberta would be financially better off." In 2020, Morton co-edited a volume of essays laying out a plan for greater self-determination for Alberta, with separation as a "viable last resort."

== Election results ==
1998 Alberta Senate nominee election
Party	Candidate	Votes	%
Reform	Bert Brown	332,766	37.32%
Reform	Ted Morton	274,126	30.75%
Independent	Guy Desroslers	148,851	16.70%
Independent	Vance Gough	135,840	15.24%
Total		891,583	–
Source(s) Source:

2004 Alberta general election results ( Foothills-Rocky View )		Turnout 50.5%	
Affiliation	Candidate	Votes	%
Progressive Conservative	Ted Morton	6,782	60.3%
Liberal	Herb Coburn	1,956	17.4%
Green	Shelley Willson	1,188	10.6%
Alberta Alliance	Jason Herasemluk	1,088	9.7%
NDP	Roland Schmidt	232	2.1%

2008 Alberta general election: Foothills-Rocky View
Party	Candidate	Votes	%	±%
Progressive Conservative	Ted Morton	6,916	57.41%	−2.90%
Liberal	Herb Coburn	2,200	18.26%	0.87%
Wildrose Alliance	Joseph McMaster	1,797	14.92%	5.92%
Green	Larry Ashmore	937	7.78%	−2.78%
New Democratic	Ricardo de Menzies	196	1.63%	−0.43%
Total		12,046	–	–
Rejected, spoiled and declined		84	–	–
Eligible electors / turnout		25,223	48.04%	-2.50%
Progressive Conservative hold		Swing		-1.88%
Source(s) Source: The Report on the March 3, 2008 Provincial General Election of the Twenty-seventh Legislative Assembly (PDF). Elections Alberta. pp. 408–413.

2012 Alberta general election: Chestermere-Rocky View
Party	Candidate	Votes	%	±%
Wildrose	Bruce McAllister	10,165	58.36%	–
Progressive Conservative	Ted Morton	6,154	35.33%	–
Liberal	Sian Ramsden	564	3.24%	–
New Democratic	Nathan Salmon	536	3.08%	–
Total		17,419	–	–
Rejected, spoiled, and declined		59	–	–
Eligible electors / turnout		31,652	55.22%	–
Wildrose pickup new district.				
Source(s) Source: "54 - Chestermere-Rocky View Official Results 2012 Alberta general election". officialresults.elections.ab.ca. Elections Alberta.
