= Reform Party of Alberta (1989–2004) =

Political party in Alberta, Canada (1989–2004)

- Former provincial party
- Leader: David Salmon
- President: Lorne Samson
- Founded: 1989
- Dissolved: 2004
- Ideology: Populism
- National affiliation: Reform Party of Canada
- Colours: Green

The Reform Party of Alberta is a defunct provincial political party in Alberta, Canada, that was registered with Elections Alberta. Its leader was David Salmon.

== Early history ==
The party was registered by members of the Reform Party of Canada on August 24, 1989 not to contest general elections, but to contest elections held by the Government of Alberta to select nominees for the Senate of Canada, a body that is appointed by the Governor General of Canada on the recommendation of the Prime Minister.

The party contested Senate nominee elections, the 1989 Senate election and the 1998 Senate election. The Reform Party of Alberta nominated and ran only three candidates in its history: Stanley Waters, Ted Morton and Bert Brown.

The other and primary purpose was to keep Reform focused as a federal party instead of being distracted by provincial campaigns. Nonetheless, there was considerable agitation at this time by some Albertan Reform members to form an active provincial party that could challenge Don Getty's unpopular Progressive Conservative government. In some opinion polls, the dormant Reform Party actually placed ahead of the Tories. When Ralph Klein was elected to lead the PCs in 1992, enthusiasm for an alternative right wing party that might split the vote with the Tories and benefit the surging Liberals quickly faded.

The Reform Party did not nominate any candidates in the 2004 Alberta general election or the 2004 Alberta Senate nominee election. As a result, the Reform Party was deregistered by Elections Alberta for failing to endorse a candidate.

The federal Reform Party's successor, the Canadian Alliance, was also not interested in forming provincial wings, but unlike Reform, the CA did not register the Alliance name with provincial electoral officers during its short history. As a result, a section of the Albertan CA membership formed the Alberta Alliance in 2002. Unlike Reform, the Alberta Alliance was an active political party—it fielded a full slate of candidates in the 2004 general election, and won one seat in the Legislature.

== Election results ==
Alberta Senate nominee elections
Election	Votes	%	Elected
1989	259,292	41.7	1 / 1
1998	606,892	68.1	2 / 2

== List of leaders ==
- David Salmon (2000 - 2004)

== 1989 Senatorial financial statement ==
According to the official archives of Elections Alberta, in the 1989 Senate election, the Stan Waters campaign received $147,822 in campaign donations, $19,000 transferred from the Reform Party of Alberta, and $23,558.96 was from fundraising functions, for a total of $190,380.96 in campaign period revenue.

Expenses for the campaign were $197,641.00, resulting in a deficit of $7,260.04.

Note: Future party leader David Salmon was Stan Waters official agent.

== See also ==
- Reform Party of Ontario
- List of Alberta political parties
