= William Harmer =

Canadian politician

The Honourable William James Harmer

Canadian Senator from Alberta
- In office February 5, 1918 – September 9, 1947
- Appointed by: Louis St. Laurent

Personal details
- Born: October 15, 1872
- Died: September 9, 1947 (aged 74) Napanee, Ontario, Canada
- Party: Liberal

William James Harmer (October 15, 1872 – September 9, 1947) was a Canadian politician.

== Early life ==
William James Harmer was born to James Harmer and Agatha Walker Harmer on October 16, 1872. His family would settle in Fort Frontenac and Harmer would attend Napanee Public Schools and Collegiate Institute. As a telegrapher Harmer moved West in 1891 where he working in Railway Operating and Traffic Departments and later became the Superintendent of operation of the Alberta Government Telephone System and Deputy Minister of the Department of Railways and Telephones in Alberta.

== Political career ==
Harmer was appointed to the Senate of Canada on the advice of Robert Borden on February 5, 1918, his appointment was made to satisfy the Unionist coalition. The appointment especially angered Richard Bennett, who was originally supposed to get the appointment but also very much opposed the parliamentary coalition.

Harmer would earn the nickname "Silent William from Alberta" in the Senate because of his infrequent participation in Senate discussions. During his 29 years in the Senate, he was never known to have made a speech. However, he sponsored a Bill in 1929 for the extension of the Canadian Pacific Railway line to Prince Albert, Saskatchewan.

Harmer served in the Senate until his death on September 9, 1947.
