= Betty Unger =

Canadian politician

The Honourable Betty E. Unger

Canadian Senator from Alberta
- In office January 6, 2012 – August 21, 2018
- Nominated by: Stephen Harper
- Appointed by: David Johnston

Personal details
- Born: August 21, 1943 (age 82) Sexsmith, Alberta, Canada
- Party: Conservative Party of Canada
- Other political affiliations: Progressive Conservative Association of Alberta; Canadian Alliance (2000)

Betty E. Unger (born August 21, 1943) is a Canadian politician and a former member of the Senate of Canada, from Alberta, Canada from January 2012 until her retirement in August 2018 upon reaching the mandatory retirement age of 75.

== Political career ==
In 2000 Unger ran for the House of Commons of Canada as a candidate for the Canadian Alliance in Edmonton West, losing a close contest to Liberal Cabinet Minister Anne McLellan. The race was so close that the media prematurely declared a Canadian Alliance victory on election night.

In 2004 she ran as a candidate in the 2004 Alberta senate nominee election. She finished a close second place behind Bert Brown. She is the first Albertan woman to be elected a senator-in-waiting. On January 6, 2012, she was appointed to the Senate on the advice of Prime Minister Stephen Harper by Governor General David Johnston.

== Electoral record ==
2004 Alberta Senate nominee election
Candidate	Party	Votes #	Votes %	Ballots %	Elected	Appointed
Bert Brown	Progressive Conservative	312,041	14.3%	43.7%	✓	July 10, 2007
Betty Unger	Progressive Conservative	311,964	14.3%	43.6%	✓	January 6, 2012
Cliff Breitkreuz	Progressive Conservative	241,306	11.1%	33.8%	✓	Term ended March 26, 2012
Link Byfield	Independent	238,751	11.0%	33.4%	✓	Resigned November 2010
Jim Silye	Progressive Conservative	217,857	10.0%	30.5%		
David Usherwood	Progressive Conservative	193,056	8.9%	27.0%		
Michael Roth	Alberta Alliance	176,339	8.1%	24.7%		
Vance Gough	Alberta Alliance	167,770	7.7%	23.5%		
Tom Sindlinger	Independent	161,082	7.4%	22.5%		
Gary Horan	Alberta Alliance	156,175	7.2%	21.9%		

2000 Canadian federal election
Party	Candidate	Votes	%	±%	Expenditures
Liberal	Anne McLellan	21,978	44.24%	–	$65,989
Alliance	Betty Unger	21,245	42.76%	–	$66,378
Progressive Conservative	Rory J. Koopmans	3,009	6.05%	–	$5,622
New Democratic	Richard D. Vanderberg	2,895	5.82%	–	$10,850
Canadian Action	Dan Parker	354	0.71%	–	$1,157
Marxist–Leninist	Peggy Morton	194	0.39%	–	
Total valid votes		49,675	100.00%		
Total rejected ballots		169	0.34%		
Turnout		49,844	56.29%		
