= Walter Patrick Twinn =

Canadian politician

The Honourable Walter Patrick Twinn

Canadian Senator from Alberta
- In office September 27, 1990 – October 30, 1997
- Appointed by: Brian Mulroney

Personal details
- Born: March 29, 1934 Slave Lake, Alberta, Canada
- Died: October 30, 1997 (aged 63) Slave Lake, Alberta, Canada
- Party: Progressive Conservative

Walter Patrick Twinn (March 29, 1934 – October 30, 1997) was a Canadian Chief of the Sawridge First Nation starting in 1966, and Senator from 1990 to 1997. Twinn was elected chief just after oil was discovered on Sawridge reserve land; with the royalties from that he created a legacy for the Sawridge band by building first the Sawridge hotel and then other buildings.

Twinn was born in Slave Lake, Alberta and attended residential school. He was appointed to the Senate in 1990 representing the senatorial division of Alberta and sitting as a Progressive Conservative. He served until his death in 1997.

He died of a heart attack in 1997 after returning from a ceremonial sweat lodge.
