= Elections Alberta =

Agency that runs elections in Alberta

Election commission overview
- Formed: 1977
- Jurisdiction: Election Act, Election Finance Contributions and Disclosure Act, Senatorial Selection Act
- Headquarters: 11510 Kingsway NW Suite 100 Edmonton, Alberta
- Employees: 21 staff (18,000 during elections)
- Annual budget: $3,785,459 (2014)
- Election commission executives: Glen Resler, Chief Electoral Officer; Pamela Renwick, Deputy Chief Electoral Officer
- Website: elections.ab.ca

Elections Alberta is an independent, non-partisan office of the Legislative Assembly of Alberta responsible for administering provincial elections, by-elections, and referendums within the province. This is in accordance with the Alberta Election Act. Elections Alberta also oversees political parties and candidates in accordance with the Election Finances and Contributions Disclosure Act.

== History ==
The Office of the Chief Electoral Officer (Elections Alberta), was created in 1977 to act as an independent body to oversee Alberta's Elections Finances and Contribution Disclosure Act and Election Act. Prior to 1977, these acts were overseen by the clerk of the Legislative Assembly.

== Jurisdiction ==
Elections Alberta oversees the creation of political parties and riding associations, compiles election statistics on ridings, and collects financial statements from party candidates and riding associations. It maintains a list of electors, through enumeration that occurs before an election. Elections Alberta is also responsible for enacting legislation relating to elections passed in the Legislative Assembly, including electoral boundary changes and Elections finance laws.

== Services ==
Elections Alberta is tasked with printing and distributing maps and Elections Alberta–related campaign materials and guides to candidates and party officials. It is mandated to issue an annual report, as well as reports after each election. These reports contain new and deregistered riding associations, party executives and contact information, donations to parties, changes to electors data, election cost by riding and as a whole, the names of returning officers are among the information in annual reports.

== Electoral Boundaries Commission ==
Electoral boundary changes come from the Alberta Electoral Boundaries Commission, made up of five appointed members. The commission collects input from residents and politicians, then draws up the divisions based on enumeration and census data. A bill is then introduced and voted on in the Legislative Assembly. Minor changes may be made and introduced by members. Changes are then implemented by the chief electoral officer.

An expansion from 83 to 87 ridings was recommended by the commission in June 2010, and their report with the new riding boundaries was in effect for the April 2012 general election.

On recommendation from the Chief Electoral Officer, Glen Resler, Bill 7 was introduced on April 12, 2016, which amended the Electoral Boundaries Commission Act to authorize the appointment of a commission on or before October 31, 2016. This is so that there was sufficient time for Elections Alberta to implement the new boundaries in time for the 2019 Alberta general election.

In December 2024, the Electoral Boundaries Commission was again mandated to propose new boundaries, this time for 89 ridings, an increase from 87.

In April 2026, the committee completed its year long work with the committee majority (including the judge), making minor adjustments, adding a seat in Edmonton and a seat in Calgary to account for the surging population growth in both cities. Included in the report was a heavily gerrymandered minority map from the UCP members of the committee. For the first time in the committee's history, the UCP led Alberta government did not approve the majority's recommendations, deciding instead to dissolve the independent committee and forming their own partisan led committee, to hastily redraw the electoral boundary maps before the November 2, 2026 deadline. For the 32nd general election it is expected that the partisan led committee redrawn boundaries will be used.

== Candidacy fees and refunds ==
In 1905, the nomination deposit was set at $100, a figure that was well beyond the means of ordinary citizens at the time. Despite inflation, this fee was not changed until 1992 when it was doubled to $200, thus remaining a nominal sum to many Albertans. In 2004, the government controversially increased the required deposit again, to $500, although it became easier to get half of the new deposit back. The government contended that the increase was necessary to deter frivolous candidacies, encourage timely filing of financial statements, and help pay for Elections Alberta's expenses. Some smaller parties argue that an excessively high deposit represents an unacceptable "user fee" on democracy.

Prior to the 2004 general election a candidate received their deposit back if they were elected or received at least one half the votes of the elected candidate. Candidates who failed to meet these benchmarks forfeited their deposits. Starting with the 2004 election however, the refund policy described above only applies to half of the new deposit ($250). The other half of the deposit is refunded if the candidate files the required financial statements with Elections Alberta within the prescribed time frame, regardless of how many votes they receive. Therefore, a failed candidate who files timely financial statements would lose $250. A change in legislation in 2010 led to the deposit being fully refundable to candidates who file their post-election financial report on time.

Prospective senate nominees are required to deposit $4,000 along with nomination papers signed by 1,500 Albertans. Candidates must be at least 30 years old in accordance with the Constitution of Canada requirement that senators own $4,000 worth of property.

== Senate nominees ==
Alberta began to hold Alberta Senate nominee elections in 1989 and remains the only province to do so. The three candidates who receive the most votes are recommended to the Canadian prime minister as Senate candidates, but there is no legal or constitutional obligation to appoint them. The prime minister has appointed three nominees to the Senate: Reform Party member Stan Waters in 1990 by Prime Minister Brian Mulroney, and Bert Brown in 2007 and Doug Black in 2013, both by Prime Minister Stephen Harper. The winners of the April 23, 2012 Senate nominee election were all Progressive Conservative Party candidates, Doug Black, Scott Tannas, and Mike Shaikh. Doug Black received the most votes and was consequently appointed to the Senate on January 25, 2013.

== Election costs ==
Year of election	Total expenses	Electoral division cost	CEO Office cost	Electors on list	Average cost/elector	Turnout	Percentage	Sources
2001	$3,538,644	$3,029,951	$508,693	1,809,171	$1.96	1,015,844	53.38%	
2004	$6,844,686	$5,969,844	$874,872	2,001,287	$3.42	894,591	45.12%	
2008	$10,682,904	$8,150,399	$2,532,505	2,557,269	$4.18	953,777	40.59%	
2012	$13,631,864	$10,868,158	$2,763,706	2,447,369	$5.57	1,298,174	54.37%	
2015	$18,987,748	$10,522,827	$8,464,921	2,622,775	$7.24	1,495,404	57.02%	
2019	$24,417,459	$15,292,388	$9,125,071	2,824,309	$8.65	1,906,366	67.50%	

== Candidates per election ==
Total candidates in Alberta elections 2001–2019
Year	2001	2004	2008	2012	2015	2019
Total candidates	318	450	407	429	398	492
Electoral divisions	83	83	83	87	87	87
Alberta Advantage	0	0	0	0	0	28
Alberta Alliance	0	83	0	0	0	0
Alberta First	16	0	0	0	1	0
Alberta Party	0	4	1	38	35	87
Communist	2	2	2	2	2	4
Evergreen	0	0	0	25	0	0
Freedom	0	0	0	0	0	24
Greens	10	49	79	0	24	32
Independence	0	0	0	0	0	63
Independent	29	10	7	12	14	25
Liberal	83	82	82	87	56	51
New Democrat	83	83	83	87	87	87
Progressive Conservative	83	83	83	87	87	1
Reform	0	0	0	0	0	1
Separation	0	12	1	1	0	0
Pro-Life (Note: Renamed from Social Credit in 2016)	12	42	8	3	6	1
United Conservative	0	0	0	0	0	87
Wildrose	0	0	61	87	86	1
Source						

== List of chief electoral officers ==
- Glen Resler (current)
- O. Brian Fjeldheim (December 2009 - April 2013)
- Lorne R. Gibson (June 2006 - March 2009)
- O. Brian Fjeldheim (October 1998 - November 2005)
- Dermot F. Whelan (September 1994 - March 1998)
- Patrick D. Ledgerwood (August 1985 - June 1994)
- Kenneth A. Wark (September 1977 - August 1985)

== List of deputy chief electoral officers ==
- Pamela Renwick (current)
- Drew Westwater
- Lori Mckee-Jeske
- Bill Sage

== See also ==
- List of Alberta general elections
- List of Alberta provincial electoral districts
