= Thelma Chalifoux =

Canadian politician

The Honourable Thelma Chalifoux

Canadian Senator from Alberta
- In office 26 November 1997 – 8 February 2004

Personal details
- Born: 8 February 1929 Calgary, Alberta, Canada
- Died: 22 September 2017 (aged 88) St. Albert, Alberta, Canada
- Party: Liberal

Thelma J. Chalifoux (8 February 1929 – 22 September 2017) was a Canadian teacher and politician. She is a member of the Métis Nation of Alberta.

== Background ==
One of five children, her mother, Helené, helped support the family by trading garden-grown vegetables. Her father, Paul Villeneuve, was a residential school survivor and served in the First World War working as a carpenter and farm hand. She studied sociology at Lethbridge Community College and later took courses in construction estimation at the Southern Alberta Institute of Technology.

Chalifoux was a social justice activist, politician, and an active figure in the Métis community. As an employee of the government agency Company of Young Canadians, she worked to advance community development initiatives in northern communities and advocated for improved housing conditions. Chalifoux co-founded the Slave Lake Friendship Centre, assisting women struggling with alcoholism and domestic abuse. She additionally championed the teaching of Cree in northern schools. Along with her community work, Chalifoux produced programming focused on Métis culture and history. She was the first woman to host a weekly show "Smoke Signals from the Peace" on Peace River's CKYL Radio and was the co-producer of the Allarcom series Our Native Heritage. In 1994 she founded and became a senior partner of Chalifoux and Associates Educational and Economic Consulting. She also owned Secret Garden Originals, a craft, and floral design business.

Chalifoux was appointed to the Canadian Senate on the advice of Prime Minister Jean Chrétien on 26 November 1997, making her the first Indigenous woman and fourth Metis person to serve in the Canadian Senate, following Richard Hardisty, William Albert Boucher, and Gerry St. Germain. She held the position until 2004 when, at the age of 75, she retired and returned to Alberta. The following year Alberta Venture magazine ranked her number 8 on their list of 50 Greatest Albertans.

After her retirement, she founded the Michif Cultural and Resource Institute now the Michif Cultural Connections Society, an organization dedicated to preserving and sharing the Métis history of Alberta. Chalifoux was the first woman to receive the National Aboriginal Achievement Award – known today as the Indspire Award - in 1994.

Chalifoux died at the age of 88 surrounded by her family on 22 September 2017, after a period of failing health.

On 8 May 2018, the Edmonton Public School Board of Trustees voted to name the new Thelma Chalifoux School (grade 7- 9) in Larkspur in her honour.

== Métis Association ==
Chalifoux joined the Métis Association in the late 1960s during the early growth of local-level activism within Métis communities. Upon joining, Chalifoux strove to fix major issues affecting the Metis by advocating within governmental bodies. She argued that there were inadequate levels of social welfare programs despite clear indications that Métis communities were among a large majority of those in Canada not meeting their basic needs. Chalifoux, advocated for the increase of affordable shelter, food, and higher welfare grants and subsidies for Métis families. She later focused her efforts on the formation of the Welfare Unit, a group of investigators that looked into complaints concerning the Alberta Government Welfare Department's dealings with Métis communities and families. Her efforts exposed welfare injustices like those that occurred at Fort Chippewa concerning the lack of funds given to various families in desperate need of assistance. Her investigations revealed accounts like that of a widow parenting "five children [and was given] $60 a month to live on." She took a special interest in helping disadvantaged Métis women who had fallen through the cracks of government bureaucracy and otherwise would have remained voiceless.

== Awards and honours ==
- National Aboriginal Achievement Award (1995)
- Métis National Council Lifetime Achievement Award (2014).
- Honorary Doctorate, University of Toronto (2004). (Awarded for her advocacy work.)

In 2023, Canada Post announced that Chalifoux will be one of three people, alongside George Manuel and Nellie Cournoyea, honoured as indigenous pioneers on new postage stamps.
