= Ron Ghitter =

Canadian politician

The Honourable Ron Ghitter CM

Canadian Senator from Alberta
- In office March 25, 1993 – March 31, 2000
- Appointed by: Brian Mulroney
- Preceded by: Stanley Waters
- Succeeded by: Tommy Banks

Member of the Legislative Assembly of Alberta for Calgary-Buffalo
- In office August 30, 1971 – March 13, 1979
- Preceded by: New District
- Succeeded by: Tom Sindlinger

Personal details
- Born: August 22, 1935 (age 90) Calgary, Alberta, canada
- Party: Progressive Conservative
- Spouse: Myrna Ghitter

Ronald D. Ghitter CM (born August 22, 1935) is a Canadian lawyer and politician. He served as a member of the Legislative Assembly of Alberta from August 30, 1971, to March 13, 1979, sitting with the governing Progressive Conservative caucus. Ghitter was appointed to the Senate of Canada on March 25, 1993, where he sat as a senator from Alberta until his retirement on March 31, 2000.

== Life and career ==
Born in Calgary, Alberta, he received his Bachelor of Arts degree in 1956 and his Bachelor of Law degree in 1959 from the University of Alberta. He practised real estate law in Calgary. From 1986 to 1988, he was executive vice president of development at Trizec Corporation.

He was first elected as a member of the Legislative Assembly of Alberta for the electoral district of Calgary-Buffalo in the 1971 Alberta general election, defeating popular Calgary Stampeders star Don Luzzi from the Alberta Social Credit Party in a very tight race. He was elected again in 1975 and then retired, having served two terms. As a member of the Progressive Conservative caucus, Ghitter was a critic of many decisions made by his party, including purchasing Pacific Western Airlines and the governments use of the Alberta Heritage Savings Trust Fund. Ghitter announced he would not retire from the legislature in November 1978, and not contest the upcoming 1979 Alberta general election.

Following revelations that Eckville school teacher James Keegstra had taught his students anti-semitic propaganda, Ghitter headed a Committee on Tolerance and Understanding. The committee investigated issues of tolerance and understanding within the educational system. This committee released its report to the government in 1984.

Ghitter re-entered politics in 1985 to run for the leadership of the Progressive Conservative Party but came in third losing to Don Getty.

He was appointed to the Senate in 1993 representing the senatorial division of Alberta. From 1996 to 1999, he was the chair of the Senate Standing Committee of Energy, the Environment and Natural Resources. Sitting as a Progressive Conservative, he resigned in 2000.

In 1990, he was awarded the Alberta Human Rights Award. He was awarded the Order of Canada on May 11, 2018, for his work on human rights legislation and various social issues.

== Electoral record ==
1971 Alberta general election results		Turnout 66.33%		Swing	
Affiliation	Candidate	Votes	%	Party	Personal
Progressive Conservative	Ron Ghitter	5,705	46.35%		
Social Credit	Don Luzzi	5,238	42.56%		
New Democratic	Jane Summers	1,364	11.09%		
Total		12,307			
Rejected, spoiled and declined		72			
Eligible electors / turnout		18,664	%		

=== 1975 general election ===
1975 Alberta general election results		Turnout 50.67%		Swing	
Affiliation	Candidate	Votes	%	Party	Personal
Progressive Conservative	Ron Ghitter	6,525	70.88%	24.53%	
Liberal	Maria Eriksen	962	10.45%	*	
New Democratic	Paula Davies	877	9.53%	-1.56%	
Social Credit	Norman Ashmead	786	8.54%	-34.02%	
Communist	David Wallis	55	0.60%	*	
Total		9,205			
Rejected, spoiled and declined		26			
Eligible electors / turnout		18,219	%		
Progressive Conservative hold		Swing		40.67%	

== Party leadership contest ==
Alberta Progressive Conservative leadership convention, 1985
Second ballot
Candidate	Votes	Percentage
Don Getty	1,061	56.2%
Julian Koziak	827	43.8%
First ballot
Candidate	Votes	Percentage
Don Getty	913	48.4%
Julian Koziak	545	28.9%
Ron Ghitter	428	22.7%
