= Bert Brown =

Canadian politician (1938–2018)

The Honourable Bert Brown

Canadian Senator from Alberta
- In office July 10, 2007 – March 22, 2013

Personal details
- Born: March 22, 1938 Calgary, Alberta, Canada
- Died: February 3, 2018 (aged 79)
- Party: Conservative Party of Canada
- Other political affiliations: Progressive Conservative Party of Alberta; Reform Party of Alberta (1998)

Bert Brown (March 22, 1938 – February 3, 2018) was a Canadian politician, farmer, and development consultant.

== Early life ==
Brown farmed in Kathyrn, Alberta, from 1969 to 1999, after which they sold their family farm. After retiring from the Senate of Canada in March 2013, he returned to land development consulting. He attended Mount Royal College and graduated from the University of Oklahoma with a degree in Civil Engineering. He was married to Alice Taylor (1965) and has one child.

== Campaign for a Triple E Senate ==
Brown was the only person to run in all three of Canada's elected senatorial elections. In 1989 and 2004 he ran under the Alberta Progressive Conservative Party and in 1998, he ran for the Reform Party of Alberta. He was elected as a senator-in-waiting in 1998 and re-elected in 2004. Brown was the only person ever to be elected to a second term as senator-in-waiting.

He had been campaigning for an elected Senate of Canada for over 23 years. He was the founder and chair of the Canadian Committee for a Triple-E Senate. The definitive symbol for the cause, he had been documented in countless Hansard transcripts in provincial legislatures across the country, as well as the federal Parliament and Senate.

He first gained fame for his cause when he used his tractor to plow "Triple E Senate or Else" into his neighbour's two-mile long field.

== Senatorial career ==
Prime Minister Stephen Harper promised to advise the Governor General to appoint Brown to the next available Senate seat from Alberta, according to comments made in the House of Commons April 18, 2007. The announcement came after long-serving senator Dan Hays announced his intent to vacate his seat in the Senate at the end of June 2007.

Brown was appointed to the Canadian Senate on July 10, 2007. Brown served five and a half years until mandatory retirement.

Brown became the second person in Canadian history, after Stan Waters, to be appointed to his Senate seat following a provincial senator-in-waiting election. Brown chose to run with the Conservative Party of Canada caucus (federal party), even though he ran under the Progressive Conservative banner (provincial party counterpart), in the Alberta Senate election.

On his 75th birthday, March 22, 2013, Brown retired from the Senate as per Senate rules.

== Awards ==
In 2005, Brown was a recipient of the Alberta Centennial Medal. The award was given to notable Albertans who made a lasting contribution in the province over the preceding 100 years.

== Views ==
Bert Brown did not acknowledge the scientific consensus on anthropogenic climate change he identified as a denier.

== Death ==
Brown died on February 3, 2018.
