= Uncodified constitution =

Type of legal doctrine

An uncodified constitution is a type of constitution where the fundamental rules often take the form of customs, usage, precedent and a variety of statutes and legal instruments. An explicit understanding of such a constitution can be developed through commentary by the judiciary, government committees or legal experts. In such a constitutional system, all these elements may be (or may not be) recognized by courts, legislators, and the bureaucracy as binding upon government and limiting its powers.

Such a framework is sometimes imprecisely called an "unwritten constitution"; however, all the elements of an uncodified constitution are typically written down in a variety of official documents, though not codified in a single document. However, there may be truly "unwritten" constitutional conventions which while not usually legally enforceable may hold just as much sway as the letter of the law. The majority of the world's countries do not use uncodified constitutions.

An uncodified constitution has the advantages of elasticity, adaptability, and resilience. A. V. Dicey described the uncodified constitution as "the most flexible polity in existence." A significant disadvantage, however, is that controversies may arise due to different understandings of the usages and customs that form the fundamental provisions of the constitution.

A new condition or situation of government may be resolved by precedent or passing legislation. Unlike a codified constitution, there are no special procedures for making a constitutional law, and it will not be inherently superior to other legislation. A country with an uncodified constitution lacks a specific moment where the principles of its government were deliberately decided. Instead, these are allowed to evolve according to the political and social forces arising throughout its history.

When viewed as a whole system, the difference between a codified and uncodified constitution is one of degree. Any codified constitution will be overlaid with supplementary legislation and customary practice after a period of time. Conversely, customs and practices that have been observed for long periods in an uncodified manner may be added to the written constitution at various junctures, such as in the case of the two-term limit for presidents of the United States. This custom was observed for nearly a century and a half, unbroken, without any enforcement mechanism until it was ignored by Franklin D. Roosevelt, after which it was added to the written Constitution as mandatory de jure.

== Current states ==
The following states can be considered to have uncodified constitutions.

Uncodified constitutions	Form	States that have this form of constitution
Uncodified constitutions	Fully uncodified	Afghanistan; New Zealand; United Kingdom
Uncodified constitutions	Codified (with uncodified religious elements)	Saudi Arabia
Uncodified constitutions	Codified (but awaiting compilation into one document)	Israel
Uncodified constitutions	Codified in multiple documents	(San Marino) San Marino
Uncodified constitutions	Codified in multiple documents, with uncodified elements	Canada

=== Afghanistan ===
Ever since the Taliban retook power in Afghanistan in 2021, the country has lacked a written constitution, but it does still have a constitutional order. The Taliban uses parts of the 1964 Constitution of Afghanistan provisionally to fill administrative gaps, but also incorporates Hanafi fiqh to judge preexisting laws alongside Pashtunwali customs. The Criminal Procedure Code for Courts, signed into law January 2026, is a major constitutional document in Afghanistan.

According to legal scholar Adam Sethi, the Taliban's uncodified constitituon is deliberatley vague in an example of what he calls "cultivated ambiguity," a situation which he compares to China and Saudi Arabia.

=== Canada ===
Although there are Constitution Acts, important aspects of the constitutional system are uncodified. The preamble to the Constitution of Canada declares it to be "similar in principle to that of the United Kingdom" (which is uncodified).

This applies at the federal level and to the provinces, although each does have the power to modify or enact their own within their exclusive areas of responsibility. To date only British Columbia has enacted a codified provincial constitution (see Constitution of British Columbia), though the other provinces' roles and powers are spelled out in section 93 of the Constitution Act, 1867, and through amendments to it dealing with particular provinces such as the Manitoba Act and the Newfoundland Act.

=== China ===
Some Chinese academics including legal theorist Jiang Shigong have argued that China has both a written constitution and an unwritten constitution based on the comprehensive leadership of the Communist Party.

=== Israel ===
The Israeli Declaration of Independence promised a constitution by 2 October 1948, but due to irreconcilable differences in the Knesset, no complete codified constitution has been written yet. However, there are several Basic Laws.

=== New Zealand ===
New Zealand has no single constitutional document. It is sometimes referred to as an "unwritten constitution", although the New Zealand constitution is in fact an amalgamation of written and unwritten sources.

The Constitution Act 1986 has a central role, alongside a collection of other statutes, orders in Council, letters patent, decisions of the courts, principles of the Treaty of Waitangi, and unwritten traditions and conventions.

=== San Marino ===
San Marino has several documents that make up its constitution, including some lasting centuries. These documents include six books of The Statutes of 1600 and the Declarations of Citizens' Rights. It is, in its oldest parts, the oldest surviving constitution in the world.

=== Saudi Arabia ===
Saudi Arabia has no legally binding written constitution. In 1960, King Faisal declared the Quran, the religious text of Islam, to be the constitution. However, in 1992, the Basic Law of Saudi Arabia was adopted by royal decree.

=== South Korea ===
Under South Korea's contemporary constitution, which was established in 1987, the country recognizes an unwritten constitution through the decisions of the Constitutional Court of Korea. A major example of this is the 2004 ruling that recognized Seoul's status as the national capital as part of the country's customary constitution (2004Hun-Ma554).

=== United Kingdom ===
In the United Kingdom, there is no defining document that can be termed "the constitution". Because the political system evolved over time, rather than being changed suddenly in an event such as a revolution, collapse of government or overthrow of monarchy, it is continuously being defined by acts of parliament and decisions of the courts. The closest the UK has come to a constitutional code has been the Treaty of Union 1707.

Due to the United Kingdom having an uncodified constitution, many acts have been added to the collection of constitutional statutes, such as the Parliament Acts 1911 and 1949, the Freedom of Information Act 2000, the Human Rights Act 1998 and the Dissolution and Calling of Parliament Act 2022. This means the United Kingdom's constitutional rules are not written in a single document.

==== Jersey and Guernsey ====
The Bailiwick of Jersey and Bailiwick of Guernsey are Crown Dependencies with a complex relationship to the United Kingdom embodied in unwritten constitutions.

== Former examples ==
- The Constitution of the Roman Republic, made up of the Twelve Tables and other statutes.
- Constitutions of the Principality of Catalonia.
- Hungary had an uncodified constitution prior to 1949.
- Sweden: What written and unwritten elements made up the Swedish constitution was the subject of much uncertainty and debate, until the Instrument of Government 1809 (1809 års regeringsform) made a point of expressly superseding “all more or less valid constitutions ... as well as ... any other such laws, acts, ordinances, statutes or decisions, however ancient or new, as have previously been included under the name of constitution”. As of 2021, the Instrument of Government specifies at paragraph 3 that the constitution of Sweden (rikets grundlagar) consists of the Instrument of Government, the Freedom of the Press Act, the Fundamental Law on Freedom of Expression and the Act of Succession.
- The Constitution of the Grand Duchy of Finland was never codified. The Emperor of Russia, who also served from 1809 to 1917 as Grand Duke of Finland, never specifically recognized the constitution as that of a separate and autonomous Finland, in spite of the fact that that constitution largely dictated the relationship between Finland and the Russian Empire throughout the Russian era in Finland.

By the late 19th century leading Finnish intellectuals—liberals and nationalists, and later, socialists as well—had come to consider Finland as a constitutional state in its own right in a mere real union with Russia. This notion clashed with emerging Russian nationalism and with Russian calls for a unitary state for Slavs only, which eventually came into conflict with Finnish separatism and constitutionalism in the form of "russification policies", which restricted Finland's extensive autonomy from 1899 onwards, excluding a brief interruption between 1905 and 1908, all the way to the February Revolution in 1917.
The Russian Provisional Government of 1917 eventually recognized the Finnish constitution, and after the October Revolution the Bolshevik government of the RSFSR recognized Finland's declaration of independence on New Year's Eve 1917.

- Andorra did not have a codified constitution until 1993 and until that date, there was no clear separation of powers. The two Andorran paréages of 1278 and 1288 were the basic laws of the country until the promulgation of the 1993 Constitution.
- The Constitution of Queensland before 2001
- Oman prior to 1996
- Libya between 1969 and 1975
- Thailand prior to 1932 had Dharmaśāstra of Manu as an uncodified constitution.
