= List of Canadian constitutional documents =

The Constitution of Canada is a large number of documents that have been entrenched in the constitution by various means. Regardless of how documents became entrenched, together those documents form the supreme law of Canada; no non-constitutional law may conflict with them, and none of them may be changed without following the amending formula given in Part V of the Constitution Act, 1982

The constitution includes legislation that was specifically written as constitutional documents, statutes that have become entrenched since their original creation, some treaties and royal proclamations, unwritten procedures adopted from the British parliamentary system of government, and unwritten underlying values.

The oldest Canadian constitutional documents were enacted before Confederation, and originated from the English or British government. Those documents were received—along with many subconstitutional laws—into the law of Canada and its provinces by means of section 129 of the Constitution Act, 1867 (then called the British North America Act, 1867). Between Confederation in 1867 and patriation in 1982, the United Kingdom enacted some Canadian constitutional documents by means of the Colonial Laws Validity Act 1865 and the Statute of Westminster 1931, most notably the British North America Acts. During this time, Canada also passed a small number of constitutional documents for itself. After patriation, all new constitutional documents were passed by the Parliament of Canada and the Legislatures of its provinces.

After patriation, the methods of constitutional entrenchment are:

1. specific mention as a constitutional document in section 52(2) of the Constitution Act, 1982;
2. amendments to constitutional documents using the amending formula in Part V the Constitution Act, 1982;
3. in some cases, reference by an entrenched document;
4. ruling by a court that a practice is part of Canada's unwritten constitution; or
5. judicial interpretation of constitutional provisions.

The list of documents for the first two methods is well-established. For the next two, however, there is debate about which documents, or which parts of those documents, are included in the constitution. In some cases, the Supreme Court of Canada has made definitive rulings regarding whether a given documents forms part of the constitution, but in many cases the question is still unclear.

== Legislation mentioned in section 52(2) ==
Section 52(2) of the Constitution Act, 1982 says "The Constitution of Canada includes (a) the Canada Act 1982, including this Act; (b) the Acts and orders referred to in the schedule; and (c) any amendment to any Act or order referred to in paragraph (a) or (b)." The schedule, in turn, lists the following documents. Most were British North America Acts and were renamed as Constitution Acts in 1982. Others include the Parliament of Canada Act, 1875, the Statute of Westminster, 1931, and acts that created new provinces or changed provincial borders.

All of these acts were originally enshrined by the Colonial Laws Validity Act 1865 in the case of acts by the United Kingdom Parliament or enshrined by the British North America (No. 2) Act, 1949 or the British North America Act, 1871 in the case of acts by the Canadian Parliament.

In addition to the acts listed here, six other acts were listed as constitutional in §52(2) but were repealed at the same time (see "Repealed constitutional documents", below).

Name	Purpose
Constitution Act, 1867; 30 & 31 Vict. c. 3 (UK), reprinted in RSC 1985, App II, No 5	Entails the original creation of a federal dominion and defines much of the operation of the Government of Canada, including its federal structure, the House of Commons, the Senate, the justice system, and the taxation system. Originally titled British North America Act, 1867.
Manitoba Act, 1870; SC 1870, c 3	Created the province of Manitoba and continued in force An Act for the Temporary Government of Rupert's Land and the North-Western Territories when united with Canada. Originally titled An Act to amend and continue the Act 32-33 Victoria, chapter 3; and to establish and provide for the Government of the Province of Manitoba.
Rupert's Land and North-Western Territory Order; 23 June 1870 (UK), reprinted in RSC 1985, App II, No 9	Royal Order declaring that Rupert's Land become a part of Canada, effective July 15, 1870. Relieved Hudson's Bay Company of any unsettled Aboriginal claims, effectively making it the responsibility of the Canadian government. Originally titled Order of Her Majesty in Council admitting Rupert's Land and the North-Western Territory into the Union.
British Columbia Terms of Union; 16 May 1871 (UK), reprinted in RSC 1985, App II, No 10	Admitted the colony of British Columbia as a province into the Dominion of Canada. Originally titled Order of Her Majesty in Council admitting British Columbia into the Union.
Constitution Act, 1871; 34 & 35 Vict. c. 28 (UK), reprinted in RSC 1985, App II, No 11	Gave Canada the power to establish new provinces and territories and change provincial boundaries with the affected province's consent. The Act recognized the creation of the province of Manitoba and the incorporation of Rupert's Land and the North-Western Territory into Canada. Originally titled British North America Act, 1871.
Prince Edward Island Terms of Union; 29 June 1873 (UK), reprinted in RSC 1985, App II, No 12	Admitted the colony of Prince Edward Island as a province into the Dominion of Canada. Originally titled Order of Her Majesty in Council admitting Prince Edward Island into the Union.
Parliament of Canada Act, 1875; 38 & 39 Vict. c. 38 (UK), reprinted in RSC 1985, App II, No 13	Clarified the power of the Canadian Parliament to legislate over, "privileges, immunities, and powers of," its members.
Adjacent Territories Order; 31 July 1880 (UK), reprinted in RSC 1985, App II, No 14	Admitted all remaining territories of British North America surrounding Canada (other than Newfoundland and its dependencies) into Canada. Originally titled Order of Her Majesty in Council admitting all British Territories possessions in North America and Islands adjacent thereto into the Union.
Constitution Act, 1886; 49 & 50 Vict. c. 35 (UK), reprinted in RSC 1985, App II, No 15	Gave parliament the authority to allow the territories of Canada to have representation in the Canadian Senate and Canadian House of Commons. Originally titled British North America Act, 1886.
Canada (Ontario Boundary) Act, 1889; 52 & 53 Vict. c. 28 (UK), reprinted in RSC 1985, App II, No 16	Extended the boundaries of Ontario.
Alberta Act; SC 1905, c 3	Created the province of Alberta out of part of the North-Western Territory, established the province's government, and created a system of subsidies to be provided by the federal government to the province.
Saskatchewan Act; SC 1905, c 42	Created the province of Saskatchewan out of part of the North-Western Territory, established the province's government, and created a system of subsidies to be provided by the federal government to the province.
Constitution Act, 1907; 7 Edw. 7. c. 11 (UK), reprinted in RSC 1985, App II, No 22	Regulated transfer payments by the federal government to smaller provinces to support their legislatures and governments. Originally titled British North America Act, 1907.
Constitution Act, 1915; 5 & 6 Geo. 5. c. 45 (UK), reprinted in RSC 1985, App II, No 23	Expanded the Canadian Senate by giving Western Canadian provinces 24 Senators, the same number guaranteed to Ontario, Quebec and the Maritime provinces. The Act also guaranteed Newfoundland six Senators should the British colony join Confederation (it did in 1949). Originally titled British North America Act, 1915.
Constitution Act, 1930; 20 & 21 Geo. 5. c. 26 (UK), reprinted in RSC 1985, App II, No 26	Gave the newer provinces of British Columbia, Alberta, Manitoba and Saskatchewan rights over certain natural resources found in federally controlled crown lands. Originally titled British North America Act, 1930.
Statute of Westminster, 1931; 22 Geo. 5. c. 4 (UK), reprinted in RSC 1985, App II, No 27	Established legislative equality for the self-governing dominions of the British Empire with the United Kingdom and gave Canada effective legislative independence on most matters.
Constitution Act, 1940; 3 & 4 Geo. 6. c. 36 (UK), reprinted in RSC 1985, App II, No 28	Gave the federal government the jurisdiction over Unemployment Insurance thus allowing such a program to be created on a national level. Originally titled British North America Act, 1940.
Newfoundland Act; 12 & 13 Geo. 6. c. 22 (UK), reprinted in RSC 1985, App II, No 32	Confirmed and gave effect to the Terms of Union agreed to between the then-separate Dominions of Canada and Newfoundland on March 23, 1949. The text of the Terms of Union of Newfoundland with Canada is contained in the schedule of the Act. Originally titled British North America Act, 1949.
Constitution Act, 1960; 9 Eliz. 2. c. 2 (UK), reprinted in RSC 1985, App II, No 37	Instituted a mandatory retirement age of 75 for all superior court judges. Originally titled British North America Act, 1960.
Constitution Act, 1964; 1964. c. 73 (UK), reprinted in RSC 1985, App II, No 38	Expanded the federal government's jurisdiction over pensions to include survivor benefits and disability benefits while continuing to allow provincial legislation. This amendment to the BNA Act made the Canada Pension Plan possible. Originally titled British North America Act, 1964.
Constitution Act, 1965; SC 1965, c 4, part I	Instituted a mandatory retirement age of 75 for all persons appointed to the Canadian Senate. Originally titled British North America Act, 1965.
Constitution Act, 1974; SC 1974-75-76, c 13, part I	Changed the rules for the redistribution of seats in the Canadian House of Commons so that Quebec would have 75 seats while other provinces seat allocation would be determined based on the size of their population in comparison to Quebec's. Provinces continued to be guaranteed to have at least as many MPs as Senators. Originally titled Representation Act, 1974, then changed to British North America Act, 1974 in 1977 before changing to its current name in 1982.
REPLACED; Constitution Act (No. 1), 1975; SC 1974-75-76, c 28, part I	Increased the number of MPs representing the Northwest Territories into two. Replaced by section 46 of Constitution Act, 1999 (Nunavut). Originally titled Northwest Territories Representation Act, then changed to British North America Act (No 1), 1975 in 1977 before changing to its current name in 1982.
Constitution Act (No. 2), 1975; SC 1974-75-76, c 53	Increased the number of Senate seats to 104 from 102 and allocated one seat for the Yukon and one for the Northwest Territories. Originally titled British North America Act (No 2), 1975.
Canada Act 1982; 1982. c. 11 (UK), reprinted in RSC 1985, App II, No 44	Decreed that no future acts of the United Kingdom Parliament would extend to Canada, thereby patriating the constitution. Includes a French language version that has equal legal weight as Schedule A. Includes the Constitution Act, 1982 (in both languages) as Schedule B.
Constitution Act, 1982; 1982, c 11, Schedule B (UK), reprinted in RSC 1985, App II, No 44	Made several amendments to the British North America Act, 1867. Includes the Charter of Rights and Freedoms as Part I. Recognized Aboriginal rights. Amended the equalization formula. Created an amending formula for the Constitution. Declared the above list of documents to be part of the Constitution.

== Amendments ==
Part V of the Constitution Act, 1982 describes the process required for amending any constitutional document from then on. The general process requires the agreement of the federal government plus seven provinces with at least 50% of the population (section 38), but some amendments require unanimity of the provinces (section 41), and some can be done unilaterally by the federal government (section 44) or bilaterally by the federal government and a provincial government (section 43). As of 2013, eleven amendments have been made under the 1982 amending formula, one of which was later repealed.

Name	Acts amended	Full text	Purpose
Constitution Amendment Proclamation, 1983; SI/84-102, (1984) C Gaz II, 2984	Constitution Act, 1982	Canada Gazette	Strengthened Aboriginal rights in the Constitution.
REPLACED; Constitution Act, 1985 (Representation); SC 1986, c 8, Part I	Constitution Act, 1867	Solon Law Archive	Modified the formula for apportioning seats in the House of Commons. Part of Representation Act, 1985. Replaced by Fair Representation Act, SC 2011, c 26.
REPLACED; Constitution Amendment, 1987 (Newfoundland Act); SI/88-11, (1988) C Gaz II, 887	Constitution Amendment, 1987 (Newfoundland Act)	Canada Gazette	Extended education rights to the Pentecostal Church in Newfoundland. Mostly replaced by Constitution Amendment, 1998 (Newfoundland Act), except for some provisions about citation.
Constitution Amendment, 1993 (New Brunswick); SI/93-54, (1993) C Gaz II, 1588	Constitution Act, 1982	Canada Gazette	Added Section 16.1 to the Canadian Charter of Rights and Freedoms, which made the English and French linguistic communities in New Brunswick equal, with the right to distinct cultural and educational institutions.
Constitution Amendment, 1993 (Prince Edward Island); SI/94-45, (1994) C Gaz II, 2021	Prince Edward Island Terms of Union	Canada Gazette	Allowed for a "fixed link" bridge to replace ferrying services to Prince Edward Island.
Constitution Amendment, 1997 (Newfoundland Act); SI/97-55, (1997) C Gaz II, Extra No 4	Newfoundland Act	Solon Law Archive	Allowed the Province of Newfoundland to create a secular school system to replace the church-based education system. Use was also made, for the first time, of §47 of the Constitution Act, 1982, which permits the House of Commons to bypass the Senate by re-enacting a draft amendment which the Senate has not adopted.
Constitution Amendment, 1997 (Quebec); SI/97-141, (1998) C Gaz II, 308	Constitution Act, 1867	Solon Law Archive	Permitted the Province of Quebec to replace the denominational school boards with ones organized on linguistic lines. The preamble to the resolution of the Quebec National Assembly adopting the amendment makes no reference to which amending formula is being used, and includes the following statement: "Whereas such amendment in no way constitutes recognition by the National Assembly of the Constitution Act, 1982, which was adopted without its consent."
Constitution Amendment, 1998 (Newfoundland Act); SI/98-25, (1998) C Gaz II, Extra No 1	Newfoundland Act	Canada Gazette	Ended denominational quotas for Newfoundland religion classes.
Constitution Act, 1999 (Nunavut); SC 1998, c 15, Part II	Constitution Act, 1867	Solon Law Archive	Granted the Territory of Nunavut representation in the Senate of Canada. The constitutional amendment was contained in sections 43 to 47 of a bill titled "An Act to amend the Nunavut Act and the Constitution Act, 1867". At the time of the Act's adoption, Leader of the Opposition Preston Manning argued that both this Act and the Nunavut Act of 1993 ought to have been adopted using a more inclusive amendment formula (probably the 7 / 50 formula), and that the failure to use the appropriate formula could result in future constitutional difficulties.
Constitution Amendment, 2001 (Newfoundland and Labrador); SI/2001-117, (2001) C Gaz II, Extra No 6	Newfoundland Act	Canada Gazette	Changed the name of the "Province of Newfoundland" to the "Province of Newfoundland and Labrador".
Fair Representation Act sections 2, 14, 15, and 17 to 20; SC 2011, c 26, ss 2, 14, 15, 17–20	Constitution Act, 1867	Justice Canada	Modified the formula for apportioning seats in the House of Commons. Only sections 2, 14, 15, and 17–20 are entrenched in the Constitution.
Constitution Amendment, 2022 (Saskatchewan Act); SI/2022-25	Saskatchewan Act	Justice Canada	Removed a historic tax exemption specific to the Canadian Pacific Railway. Amendment was made retroactive over 50 years, to 1966.
Preserving Provincial Representation in the House of Commons Act section 2 SC 2022, c 6, s 2	Constitution Act, 1867	Justice Canada	Changed minimum number seats in the House of Commons for each province from the 1985 distribution to the 2019 distribution. Only section 2 is entrenched in the Constitution.

== Documents entrenched by reference ==
The Constitution Act, 1982 recognizes treaties between the Crown and Canada's Aboriginal people, such as these Numbered Treaties.

A document can become entrenched in the Constitution if it is mentioned by a document that is already entrenched. There is no conclusive list of documents, or parts of documents, that are entrenched in this way, so courts may expand or restrict this list in the future.

One notable example are agreements with the Aboriginal people of Canada. Section 35(1) of the Constitution Act, 1982 says that "the existing aboriginal and treaty rights of the aboriginal peoples of Canada are hereby recognized and affirmed", while section 25 recognizes that rights in the Charter will not abrogate or derogate from existing or future aboriginal rights. By referencing these agreements in a constitution act, these agreements are, themselves, given constitution-level authority. These rights include:

- Royal Proclamation of 1763 (7 October 1763 (UK), reprinted in RSC 1985, App II, No 1); and
- existing or future land claim agreements

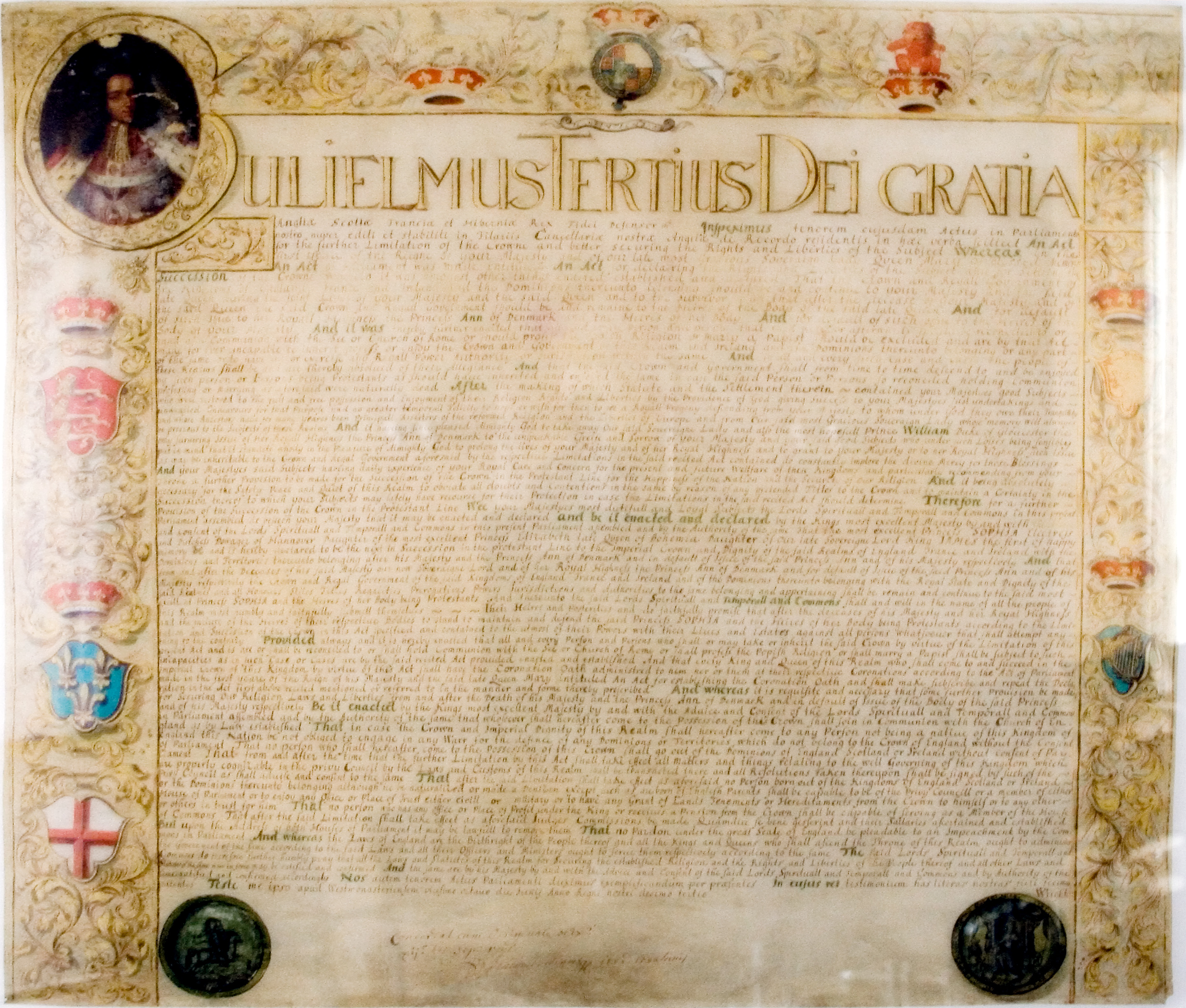
Canadians cannot claim rights mentioned in the Act of Settlement, 1701, but its rules about the monarchy cannot be changed without going through the 1982 amending formula, and it can be influential when interpreting the Constitution.

Some documents became entrenched in the constitution in 1982 because the amending formula in Part V of the Constitution Act, 1982, says that their subject matter can only be amended using the amending formula. In some cases, only part of the document is affected by this. Not all relevant documents have been tested in court to see whether they have truly become Constitutionally entrenched, while others have been deemed by the Supreme Court to be part of Canada's constitution. Two notable examples are the power to make changes to the office of the Governor General of Canada and the Supreme Court of Canada. The documents creating those two institutions are not mentioned in §52(2) as constitutional documents, but are mentioned in the amending formula. In Reference Re Supreme Court Act, ss 5 and 6, the Supreme Court found that its compositions could only be changed according to the constitutional amendment rules. The same would presumably be true of the office of the Governor General for the same reason. Acts governing these bodies are:

- Supreme Court Act (RSC 1985, c S-26) for parts about the structure of the court; and
- Letters Patent, 1947 (8 September 1947, reprinted in RSC 1985, App II, No 31) for parts about the structure of the office of the Governor General.

Another subject specifically mentioned in the amending formula is the role of the Canadian monarchy. There are two key pre-Confederation documents of the English parliament that continue to govern the powers and the line of succession of the Canadian monarch: the Bill of Rights 1689 and the Act of Settlement 1701. In both cases, provisions with regard to the monarchy are to be taken literally. Additionally, the rules for the line of succession were amended by the Parliament of Canada in 2013 to align with amendments made in the United Kingdom. It has been argued that additional British documents about the monarchy are entrenched by the preamble of the Constitution Act, 1867, which says in part that Canada will have a "Constitution similar in Principle to that of the United Kingdom". The preamble may therefore entrench key British documents like the Act of Settlement, 1701, the English Bill of Rights, 1689, and the Magna Carta. However, the Supreme Court has ruled that Canadians cannot claim specific rights mentioned in those documents, and that their provisions with regard to civil rights or the constitutional order are to be taken foundationally. Documents affected by reference in the amending formula include:

- English Bill of Rights, 1689 (1 Will. & Mar. Sess. 2. c. 2) for any parts relating to the monarchy;
- Act of Settlement, 1701 (12 & 13 Will. 3. c. 2) for any parts relating to the monarchy;
- Succession to the Throne Act, 1937 (1 Geo. VI, c. 16); and
- Succession to the Throne Act, 2013 (SC 2013, c 6).

One section of the amending formula, section 41, says that "the legislature of each province may exclusively make laws amending the constitution of the province". This might entrench some pre-Confederation legislation concerning the colonies that are now Canadian provinces, but that same section allows the provinces to amend the legislation unilaterally despite them being part of the constitution.

== Unwritten constitutional sources ==
Some constitutional rules in Canada cannot be found in any of the above documents, and have been ruled to be implicitly part of the Canadian constitution by the courts. Many of these rules are old British conventions that were incorporated into Canadian law by the preamble of the Constitution Act, 1867, which says that the Constitution should be "similar in Principle to that of the United Kingdom", much of which itself is unwritten. There are three general sources of unwritten constitutional rules: conventions, royal prerogative, and unwritten principles.

The first type of unwritten source is constitutional conventions. This includes the role of the Prime Minister of Canada, which was not mentioned in the Constitution until 1982, and even then only in passing. It also includes the fact that the governor general in most circumstances is required to grant royal assent to bills adopted by both houses of parliament, and the requirement that the prime minister either resign or request a dissolution and general election upon losing a vote of confidence in the House of Commons. Many of unwritten rules based on the preamble concern the procedure for how the Parliament of Canada and the Assemblies of its provinces are run. For example, in the case New Brunswick Broadcasting Co. v. Nova Scotia (Speaker of the House of Assembly), the Supreme Court of Canada ruled that parliamentary privilege is a part of the unwritten convention in the Constitution of Canada, which means that Parliament may use parliamentary privilege to take certain actions even though they violate another part of the constitution. Most of these procedures have never been addressed by the Supreme Court, so it is not clear which ones form part of the constitution.

The second type of unwritten source is the royal prerogative: reserve powers of the Canadian Crown, being remnants of the powers once held by the British Crown, reduced over time by the parliamentary system. Primarily, these are the Orders in Council, which give the government the authority to declare war, conclude treaties, issue passports, make appointments, make regulations, incorporate, and receive lands that escheat to the Crown.

The third type, unwritten principles, are values that are incorporated into the Canadian constitution by the preamble of the Constitution Act, 1867. Unlike conventions, they are legally binding. In Reference re Secession of Quebec, the court ruled that there are at least four fundamental tenets that form part of the constitutional framework of Canada: federalism, democracy, constitutionalism and the rule of law, and respect for minorities. Other principles include responsible government, representation by population, judicial independence, and parliamentary supremacy. Despite their binding nature, the Supreme Court held that unwritten principles could not invalidate legislation in Toronto v. Ontario.

== Judicial interpretations ==
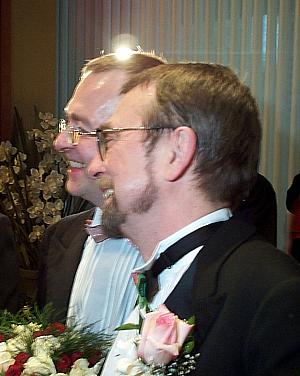
Michael Hendricks and René Leboeuf become the first same-sex couple to legally marry in Quebec after the Quebec Court of Appeal finds that sexual orientation is an unwritten protected ground in the Charter of Rights and Freedoms in the case Hendricks and Leboeuf v Quebec.

Interpretation of the Canadian Constitution has been significantly affected by the decisions of courts, which have the power to determine the meaning of phrases and, in some cases, even read into it rules that are implied but not directly stated. Canada's Constitution is not limited to the interpretation that would have been used by the original drafters, unlike countries that use originalism to interpret their constitutions. The power of the courts to update the meaning of the Constitution to fit with changing times was first established in the Persons Case, which decided that the word "person" in the Constitution included women. The Persons Case referred to this principle as the "living tree doctrine".

In spite of the living tree doctrine, for several decades Canadian courts mostly limited themselves to interpreting the Constitution for issues of jurisdiction. For example, courts determined that airports were within the power of the federal government even though the original drafters of the Constitution could not have conceived of an airport. After the introduction of the Constitution Act, 1982 and the Charter of Rights and Freedoms, Canadian courts became much more active in interpretation of Constitutional questions. One notable example is in the case of gay rights and section 15(1) of the Charter. Section 15(1) lists grounds against which people may not be discriminated by the government, and includes race, religion, sex, and others, but it does not limit itself to the listed grounds. Consequently, numerous provincial superior court cases, beginning with Halpern v. Canada (Attorney General) in Ontario, ruled that sexual orientation was an unwritten protected ground under section 15(1).

== Repealed constitutional documents ==
=== Repealed before 1982 ===
There were a number of documents that are generally seen as constitutional but were repealed before the Canada Act came into effect. The Revised Statute of Canada 1970 contains a list of constitutional documents, which was drafted by the government although was not an official list like the schedule of the Constitution Act 1982 would be. That list contained the pre-1970 documents listed in the schedule of the Constitution Act 1982, plus the Royal Proclamation 1763 and the following documents. All of the following documents were either redundant with a later constitutional document, were repealed, or were spent after they served their one purpose.

Name	Full text	Purpose
Quebec Act 1774; 14 Geo. 3. c. 83 (GB), reprinted in RSC 1970, App II, No 2	Wiki- source	
Constitutional Act 1791; 31 Geo. 3. c. 31 (GB), reprinted in RSC 1970, App II, No 3	Wiki- source	
Act of Union 1840; 3 & 4 Vict. c. 35 (UK), reprinted in RSC 1970, App II, No 4	Solon Law Archive	
Rupert's Land Act 1868; 31 & 32 Vict. c. 105 (UK), reprinted in RSC 1970, App II, No 6	Wiki- source	An Act for enabling Her Majesty to accept a Surrender upon Terms of the Lands, Privileges, and Rights of "The Governor and Company of Adventurers of England trading into Hudson's Bay," and for admitting the same into the Dominion of Canada. The land were admitted into Canada, to the purpose of the act is spent.
Temporary Government of Rupert's Land Act, 1869; SC 1869, c 3	Wiki- source	Fully titled "An Act for the temporary Government of Rupert's Land and the North-Western Territory when united with Canada". Originally set to expire at the end of the next session of Parliament, but extended by the Manitoba Act until the end of the session of Parliament next succeeding 1 January 1871. It thus expired at the end of the 4th session of the 1st Canadian Parliament on 14 April 1871.
Statute Law Revision Act 1893; 56 & 57 Vict. c. 14 (UK), reprinted in RSC 1970, App II, No 16	Wiki- source	Removed spent sections of the Constitution Act, 1867
Yukon Territory Act, 1898; SC 1898, c 6	Wiki- source	
British North America Act, 1916; 6 & 7 Geo. 5. c. 19 (UK), reprinted in RSC 1970, App II, No 23	Wiki- source	Extended the term of the 12th Parliament of Canada. Repealed by Statute Law Revision Act, 1927.
Statute Law Revision Act 1927; 17 & 18 Geo. 5. c. 42 (UK), reprinted in RSC 1970, App II, No 24	Wiki source	Removed section 1(2) from the British North America Act, 1915 and repealed British North America Act, 1916.
Statute Law Revision Act 1950; 14 Geo. 6. c. 6 (UK), reprinted in RSC 1970, App II, No 32	Wiki- source	Removed the redundant section 118 of the Constitution Act, 1867.
Miscellaneous Statute Law Revision Act 1977; 1977 c. 28 (Canada)	Wiki- source	Renamed constitutional documents that were, again renamed by the Constitution Act, 1982.

=== Repealed in 1982 ===
There were six acts named as constitutional in section 52(2) of the Constitution Act, 1982, but were repealed at the same time:

Name	Full text	Purpose
Canadian Speaker (Appointment of Deputy) Act 1895; 59 Vict. Sess. 2. c. 3 (UK), reprinted in RSC 1970, App II, No 17	Wiki- source	"An Act for removing Doubts as to the Validity of an Act passed by the Parliament of the Dominion of Canada respecting the Deputy-Speaker of the Senate"
British North America Act 1943; 6 & 7 Geo. 6. c. 30 (UK), reprinted in RSC 1970, App II, No 28	Wiki- source	"An Act to provide for the readjustment of the representation of the provinces in the House of Commons of Canada consequent on the decennial census taken in the year one thousand nine hundred and forty-one"
British North America Act 1946; 9 & 10 Geo. 6. c. 63 (UK), reprinted in RSC 1970, App II, No 29	Wiki- source	"An Act to provide for the readjustment of representation in the House of Commons of Canada on the basis of the population of Canada"
British North America (No. 2) Act 1949; 12, 13 & 14 Geo. 6. c. 81 (UK), reprinted in RSC 1970, App II, No 31	Wiki- source	"An Act to amend the British North America Act, 1867, as respects the amendment of the Constitution of Canada"
British North America Act 1951; 14 & 15 Geo. 6. c. 32 (UK), reprinted in RSC 1970, App II, No 33	Wiki- source	"An Act to amend the British North America Act, 1867"
British North America Act 1952; SC 1952, c 15	Wiki- source	"An Act to amend the British North America Acts, 1867 to 1951, with respect to the Readjustmunt of Representation in the House of Commons"

=== Repealed after 1982 ===
Three constitutional documents have been replaced using the 1982 amending formula:

Name	Full text	Purpose
Constitution Amendment, 1987 (Newfoundland Act); SI/88-11, (1988) C Gaz II, 887	Canada Gazette	Extended education rights to the Pentecostal Church in Newfoundland. Replaced by Constitution Amendment, 1998 (Newfoundland Act).
Constitution Act (No. 1), 1975; SC 1974-75-76, c 28, part I	Solon Law Archive	Increased the number of MPs representing the Northwest Territories into two. Replaced by section 46 of Constitution Act, 1999 (Nunavut). Originally titled British North America Act, 1975.
Constitution Act, 1985; SC 1986, c 8, part I	Solon Law Archive	Modified the formula for apportioning seats in the House of Commons. Part of Representation Act, 1985. Replaced by Fair Representation Act, SC 2011, c 26.
