= International constitutional law =

Study of constitutions as part of the international legal system

International constitutional law is the study of constitutions in general, and combines aspects of constitutional law, public international law and legal theory. It adds international and transnational treaties to constitutional law. In federal states, subnational constitutions can also be identified. In this multi-level approach to constitutional law there are various relationships between constitutions (network of constitution law).

== See also ==
- Constitution
- World constitution
- List of national constitutions

== Relevant articles ==
- Erika de Wet, "The International Constitutional Order", International and Comparative Law Quarterly 55 (2006), 53–76.
- Ulrich Haltern, "Internationales Verfassungsrecht? Anmerkungen zu einer kopernikanischen Wende", Archiv des öffentlichen Rechts 128 (2003), 511–557. (German)
