= Algerian Fundamental Pact of 1657 =

Constitutional text

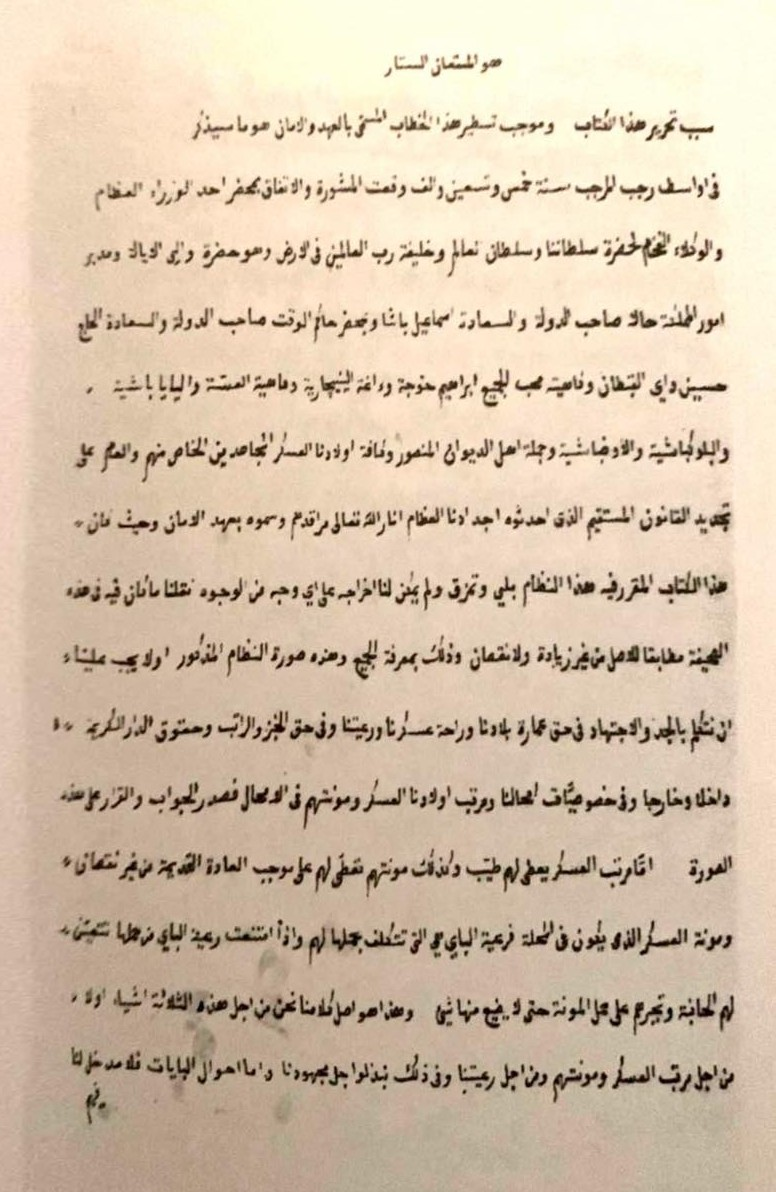
First page of the Algerian Fundamental Pact (Pact of trust). Issued by Dey Mohamed Ibn Bekir Pasha in 1748

The Fundamental Pact of 1748, or Pact of trust (Arabic: عهد الأمان, ʿAhd al-Amān, literally “Pact of Security”), is a political-military foundational text decreed first at the beginning of Ramadan 1068 AH (1657 CE) by the divan of the Algerian Janissary Odjaq, and renewed on 3 Safar 1161 AH (1748 CE) in the Ottoman Regency of Algiers by the Dey of Algiers, Mohamed Ibn Bekir, in order to define the rights of the Dey’s subjects and of all inhabitants living in the Regency of Algiers. A copy of this text is preserved at the National Library of Algeria, classified under (Group No. 3190 – File No. 02 – Document No. 55).

Considered a true regulation or law, it codifies the conduct of the different odjaks (corps) of the Regency’s army: the Janissaries, the artillerymen, the chaouchs, and the sipahis. The text addresses several issues: the salary of the Janissary militia, the rights of the oppressed, the prohibition of offenses against the population, rules regarding the collection of taxes by the mehalla, respect for Islamic law, and additional rights for the Kouloughlis. According to Algerian historian Lmnouar Merouche, the pact set up a constitutional basis of power in the Regency.

== Content ==
=== The Pact of trust of the Regency of Algiers, issued at the beginning of Ramadan 1068 AH / 1657 CE and renewed in 1161 AH / 1748 CE ===
On the reasons that led to the drafting of this Pact:

Our Regency of Algiers was governed in succession by our forefathers: the Beys, the Aghas, the Yaya-bashis, and the Buluk-bashis. Their number reached about eighty to ninety, or even a hundred. From the very beginning of the existence of the Odjaq (the Janissary corps), the Aghas, Kikhiyas, Yaya-bashis, and Buluk-bashis were under the authority of some Pashas and Beys. These caused repeated disturbances in the military administration. Some were deprived of promotion in rank; others were punished by death or sent back to their original homelands in Turkey. As for the remainder, they resolved to draw up a Pact of trust (ʿAhd al-Amān) founded upon strict rules, where every violation would be punishable by death. These are the decisions contained in the Pact.

However, in later times this legislation fell into neglect, forgotten as a result of tyranny and oppression. Disorder spread after this laxity, leading to the collapse of the army of the Regency and the weakening of the victorious forces. Mutual resentment filled hearts; their eyes closed, pride and selfishness dominated, and indifference toward others grew. Hatred and hostility spread among them, until even father stood against son, brother against brother, friend against friend. Enmity, rancor, and quarrels prevailed, turning them into bitter enemies.

In the last year (1161 AH / 1748 CE), disorder worsened and became more dangerous. Wars and conflicts broke out. To put an end to this deplorable situation, it was resolved that the Divan should gather in our palace, with all of us present, and take the necessary measures to prevent the recurrence of such turmoil, and to set ourselves on the straight path. We pray to our Lord, exalted be His majesty, to bless our assembly and raise the standing of our Odjaq until the Day of Resurrection, by His generosity and bounty.

In summary, the Pact of Tust was drafted, with the help of our rulers and all our victorious soldiers. It declared: our Janissary brothers and our sons the Kouloughlis (sons of Turks and local women) may remain in service until the age of forty, fifty, or sixty—that is, until old age. At such an age, hands and feet fail, the body weakens, and a man can no longer fulfill his duties effectively in campaigns on land or sea, in winter or summer. Retirement is therefore required before the earth becomes our bed and stones our pillows. Otherwise, one would be subjected to hard labor, which need not be described in detail.

Let our brothers also know: there is no work for us outside this land. Here we marry, divorce, raise sons and daughters. In this kingdom there is no contract left unfulfilled, no duty neglected. At the end of our existence, it is our duty to return to the Creator, glorify Him, acknowledge His blessings, and pray for our Sultan, the Padishah (Sultan of Constantinople).

From this day forward, all past grievances, even between father and son, are to be forgotten and pardoned. Pride, anger, hatred, and every cause of enmity must be removed from hearts. Courtesy, love, and affection shall prevail. We are all brothers, obliged to defend one another, setting aside past events with no resentment.

From now on, the elders remain elders, the Aghas remain Aghas, the Kikhiyas remain Kikhiyas, the Yaya-bashis remain Yaya-bashis, the Buluk-bashis remain Buluk-bashis, the Odabashis remain Odabashis, and the Janissaries remain Janissaries. Each fulfills his assigned duty without overstepping, negligence, or laxity.

The Agha must govern according to the provisions of Islamic law (sharīʿa), striving to enforce respect for it. He must never deviate, even if the one judged is dear to him. Law and Islamic regulations are binding in all circumstances. Even if the accused is close to us, he must be judged like other Muslims in public, according to the strict application of the sharīʿa. In complex cases beyond the Agha’s ability, they must be referred to the Yaya-bashis, who assist in applying justice so that rights are restored and divine blessings are secured. Failure to uphold justice leads the Odjaq into disorder, hatred, and quarrels, which we reject. Our desire is to remove resentments and avoid the downfall of our corps.

To achieve this goal, the Pact of Security must be faithfully followed. Each must be content with the salary assigned to him, stop sowing discord, and not stray from the path of the Muhammadan law.

There are in some regions pious men, the marabouts. They must be received with honor, and their counsel followed literally, for God accepts their prayers on your behalf. Open your eyes to their wise advice. We pray to Almighty God to ease our affairs, open our eyes, enlighten our minds, and purify our relations. May He remove anger and replace it with patience, love, and compassion until the moment of a good ending.

The best Pact desired in the Regency of Algiers is the path of jihād, for we are surrounded by enemies on all four sides. We shall sacrifice and strive day and night for the sake of God, to gain His pleasure and reward. But laziness, negligence, and attachment to worldly pleasures have blinded us. We pray to God to restore our sight, remove the veil of heedlessness, and guide us to wisdom. O Lord of the worlds, by the honor of the Messenger, Amen.

From now on, our sons the Janissaries shall remain Janissaries, our sons the artillerymen artillerymen, our sons the Chawushes Chawushes, our sons the Spahis Spahis. Each in his place, each member of the Odjaq serves continually without error, abuse, or injustice.

The foundations of the Pact of Security:

- From this day forth, sons of Chawushes, artillerymen, Spahis, converts from Christianity (ʿulūj), and local leaders (qiyād) are forbidden from enrolling in the Janissary corps. Only the sons of Janissaries already in service may be enrolled.
- The Winter Campaign (maḥalla) must postpone its movements if an enemy attacks the Regency. The Kasbah of Algiers is to be guarded daily by six hundred Buluk-bashis: two hundred serving, four hundred forming the Divan. This was debated many times and agreed upon unanimously. The Kasbah is our source of pay, ammunition, and sustenance, hence it must be protected. Measures were also taken to guarantee housing and bread distribution for the Janissaries.
- Coin minters must be trusted with the new coinage and forbidden from misusing or circulating it. Whoever acts contrary is executed.
- Any soldier inciting mutiny is barred from entering Algiers. If an entire maḥalla mutinies, all are banned from entering the city. Any found later in Algiers shall be flogged to death.
- No revenues are to be given to the Agha, Kikhiya, Buluk-bashi, or Chawush upon the maḥalla’s return.
- If an Agha errs in his command, he may be dismissed, pending investigation.
- Absentees from campaign duty are arrested by the Chawush and handed to the Agha for punishment. Desertion of more than three days leads to expulsion from the Odjaq. Judgments must be preceded by rigorous inquiry, avoiding injustice, and always applying Islamic law strictly.
- Soldiers with travel permits receive three days’ pay in advance. The sick continue to receive their wages. Travelers from Tunis, Tripoli, or Tlemcen also receive their rations without interruption.
- Letters sowing discord are forbidden: the bearer is beheaded, and the letter torn. Letters with good news may circulate.
- Each group’s affairs remain internal: what happens in Algiers concerns Algiers only, what happens in the maḥalla concerns the maḥalla, etc. News must not spread outside its origin to avoid unrest.

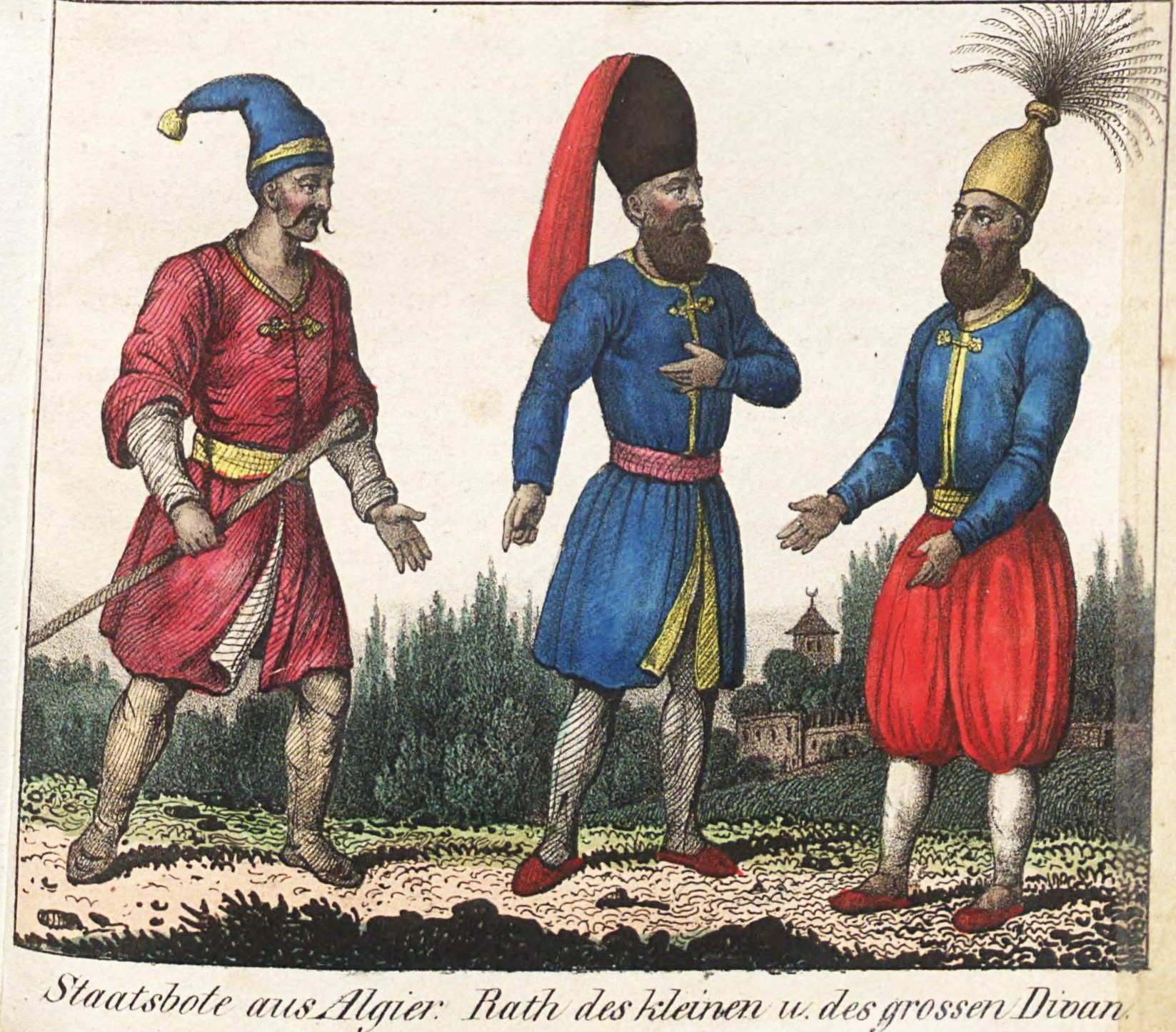
A Chouche (left), private (center) and Grand divan (right) members. Friedrich Wilhelm Goedsche, 1832.

The Pact was written to prevent ignorance and disorder. We have taken this measure to guard against any excuse of ignorance, and so that no one acts according to his own whim by following the path of error. We have made it a matter of instruction so that everyone may walk in its path and refrain from transgressing or violating it. We ask God Almighty to ease for us the way of good, and to open our eyes to what is right. O Lord of the Worlds.

We have put our decisions in writing so that no one will overlook them in the future, and so that each person adheres to the limits of his duties.

Anyone appointed to be part of the detachment may not leave to join his company until his health permits it. Upon his arrival everyone exchanges love, affection, and kindness as was the case before.

In the month of Jumada al-Ula of the year one thousand and twelve AH (1012 AH / 1602 CE) there was an order concerning the Padishah who had arrived, supported by the divan, and in the presence of Suleiman Pasha and all the victorious soldiers, great and small. This meeting and the ensuing deliberations resulted in the decision to close the gap of ambiguity that had arisen from that order by means of supplementary measures.

Everything that happened in the past is forgotten; we acknowledge and affirm the orders of the divan, and what will take place from today onward — what has passed is past. Such events must not be repeated; whoever repeats them should blame no one but himself for the consequences of his conduct, for he thereby paves the way to his death.

Any brave deed, by land or sea, is rewarded with an extra salary of 2.5 saimas, but no more.

This Pact was attended by 300 former Aghas, 600 Buluk-bashis, and 424 Odabashis. It was read publicly, then entrusted to the Agha of the Palace (Agha al-ʿaskar) for safekeeping. At the end of his service, he passes it to his successor. If destroyed, it must be rewritten by a committee of senior officers.

The Pact is binding and must be respected. Each must treat his companions with love and kindness. May God guide us to the straight path and grant us prosperity, Amen.

This copy of our former ahad aman was made in the first days of the noble and blessed month of Ramadan, in the year one thousand sixty-eight (1657 CE), during the rule of Ibrahim Pasha, in the presence of all the victorious soldiers who took cognizance of it. The delegates of the company of the agha were: Khelil Agha, Drouiche Yayabachi, Moustafa Bouloukbachi, and Mansour Sari Oda. It was in their presence that the drafting took place. The reading was carried out in the divan, in the presence of all the victorious soldiers, and the document was then deposited into the hands of the Agha al-ʿaskar, Mohammed Agha. This delivery is complete; may God bless it, amen!

Later, in 1069 AH (1658 CE), all the soldiers assembled and decided that the Odabashis and deputies of the Buluk-bashis must sleep in the Janissary barracks; whoever fails shall be denied bread and pay.

This was the decision of the Divan in the time of Aḥmad Agha.

The caftan of the Agha al-ʿaskar is exclusively intended for the holder of these functions. When an Agha al-ʿaskar has finished his term of service, he hands this garment over to his successor. According to this rule, the caftan must be passed from hand to hand at all times, as recorded here, so that it is not deviated from.

On the back:

Ahad aman of Algiers.

When an Agha al-ʿaskar ceases his functions and becomes Ma’zoul Agha, the caftan is taken from him, as well as the ahad aman of which he is the custodian, written on white parchment. These two objects are then handed over to his successor, who puts on the caftan and hangs the ahad aman around his neck, like a necklace.

This renewal was issued in the reign of Muḥammad Pasha, 23 Jumāda al-Awwal 1162 AH (1748 CE).

== Comments ==
According to professor Sid Ahmed Ben-Namaani, the Pact of trust in Algeria was indeed similar to a basic law (constitution), and thus was one of the first documents of its kind in the history of Arab and Islamic states, aiming at establishing political and social security and stability. The treaty in 1748 is clear evidence that the Algerian state existed and that modernity in Algeria was not the result of French colonial presence, contrary to what French colonial writings claim. Professor Taoufik Dahmani compares the Algerian pact of trust with Ottoman imperial law (Qānūn al-Bādişāhī) and similar charters in Tunisia. The text argues that these laws served as fundamental legal frameworks to maintain internal order, regulate relations between rulers and subjects, and legitimize Ottoman authority. The author stresses that the Ottomans, after long experience, realized Algeria could not be governed without a constitutional-like framework. The strength of the state depended on laws, institutions, and continuous interaction with society, particularly in a frontier region shaped by the fall of al-Andalus and the arrival of Moriscos. Despite claims that Algeria under Ottoman rule was chaotic, the ʿAhd al-Amān represented a structured legal tradition, even if sometimes informal or unwritten.

The pact also highlights the Ottoman governors’ reliance on Islamic legitimacy, local customs, and organized military structures (Janissaries, corsairs) to maintain authority. The treaties of 1657 and 1748 show remarkable consistency, with only minor variations, and were applied across the three provinces (Beyliks). These charters were originally written in Ottoman Turkish, later translated into Arabic and French, and reveal both continuity and adaptation in governance. Ultimately, the ʿAhd al-Amān was central to Ottoman Algeria’s political stability, serving as a practical “constitution” that guided administration, justice, and relations with the population.

However, Ben-Namaani stresses that the pact came in unfavorable external circumstances, especially the growing foreign campaigns, particularly French ones, which later occupied Algeria in 1830. The continued assassination of rulers by the Janissary army, including Dey Mohamed Ben Bekir who initiated the treaty, shows that the treaty failed to achieve economic prosperity and political and social stability in Algeria. The best proof of the treaty’s failure to achieve its long-term aims was the fall of Algeria to French occupation in 1830. This also shows that what the Ottoman Algerian state and the Ottoman Empire in general lacked was radical reform of their systems.
