= Wiki-constitutionalism =

High turnover of a polity's constitutions

Wiki-constitutionalism is a neologism coined by political analyst Daniel Lansberg-Rodriguez in a 2010 article for The New Republic. The term describes the phenomenon in which national governments, particularly in Latin America, rewrite their constitutions completely every few years, a habit which Lansberg-Rodriguez argues usually leads to overly strengthened executives as other branches of government will lack "the institutional legitimacy, memory, relationships, and mandate necessary to govern independently." The term itself is an amalgam of constitution and the "ever-morphing articles on the open-source database Wikipedia." Lansberg-Rodriguez' article was later recommended for reading by The New York Times.

== Overview ==
The principal evidence cited for the existence of "Wiki-constitutionalism" is the sheer number of constitutions which have existed in Latin America when compared with other regions of the globe. If one looks at fully restructured rewrites (as opposed to amendments), "the Dominican Republic has had 32 separate constitutions since its independence in 1821. Venezuela follows close behind with 26, Haiti has had 24, Ecuador 20, and Bolivia recently passed its seventeenth" and "over half of the 21 Latin American nations have had at least ten constitutions while, in the rest of the world, only Thailand (17), France (16), Greece (13), and Poland (10) have reached double digits."

The original piece is highly critical of leaders such as Hugo Chávez, Rafael Correa and Evo Morales who have allegedly helped prolong a self-perpetuating cycle of constitutional attrition by pushing new constitutions packaged with "ever-longer lists of promises and rights alongside greater executive functions", resulting in constitutions which are "not only the shortest-lived, but also among the longest in the world." Bolivia's and Ecuador's constitutions have 411 and 444 articles, respectively, and "read like laundry lists of guaranteed rights, such as access to mail and telephones; guarantees for culture, identity, and dignity; and shorter work-weeks."

== Controversy ==
After an unauthorized and inaccurate Spanish translation of the article began circulating in May 2010, controversy erupted in the Dominican press over Wiki-constitutionalism and whether the mention of Dominican President Leonel Fernández alongside Hugo Chávez, Rafael Correa, Evo Morales and Colombian president Álvaro Uribe as "attempting to tear up and revise their constitutionally mandated term limits" was tantamount to an accusation of his being a dictator. Ramon Morel Cerda, the former head of the Supreme Electoral Council for the Dominican Republic discussed the controversy on June 7, 2010, in an opinion piece for the "Hoy" Newspaper.
