= Section 21 =

Section 21 may refer to:

- The nurses' section of Arlington National Cemetery, a US military cemetery
- Section Twenty-one of the Canadian Charter of Rights and Freedoms, concerning language rights
- Section 21 of the Housing Act 1988 of the UK, concerning a formal notice to quit — see Section 21 notice
- Section 21 of the Indian Penal Code, definition of "public servant"
- Section 21 of the Constitution Act, 1867, Canada
