= Prince Edward Island Terms of Union =

Part of the Constitution of Canada adding PEI

Prince Edward Island Terms of Union Conditions de l’adhésion de l’Île-du-Prince-Édouard

Part of the Constitution of Canada
- Citation: SC 1873, p. ix (original citation – English); SC 1873, p. ix (original citation – French); RSC 1985, App. II, No. 12 (bilingual version)
- Territorial extent: Canada; Prince Edward Island
- Considered by: Negotiations between representatives of Canada and the colony of Prince Edward Island and Canada; Senate of Canada; House of Commons of Canada; Legislative Assembly of Prince Edward Island; Legislative Council of Prince Edward Island
- Enacted by: Queen-in-Council (UK)
- Enacted: June 26, 1873
- Assented to by: Victoria
- Commenced: July 1, 1873
- Authorizing legislation: Constitution Act, 1867, s. 146

Text of statute as originally enacted
- Status: Current legislation

The Prince Edward Island Terms of Union (French: Conditions de l’adhésion de l’Île-du-Prince-Édouard) is one of the enactments which make up the Constitution of Canada. It united the colony of Prince Edward Island with Canada, and contains the terms and conditions of the union that had been negotiated between the governments of Prince Edward Island and Canada.

In 1864, Prince Edward Island hosted the Charlottetown Conference, which was the first conference on the possible union of the British North American provinces, and had participated in the second conference, the Quebec Conference. However, Prince Edward Island did not join Canada in 1867.

By 1873, Prince Edward Island reconsidered and negotiations began with Canada. The three main issues were the size of the PEI representation in the House of Commons, financial aid for the cost of building the PEI railway, and financial aid for buying out the absentee landlords. The Canadian government agreed to favourable terms.

Once the terms had been approved by the House of Commons, the Senate, the Legislative Assembly and the Legislative Council of PEI, the terms went to the British government for ratification. They were approved by an order-in-council under the statutory authority of s. 146 of the Constitution Act, 1867.
