= Section 147 of the Constitution Act, 1867 =

Provision of the Constitution of Canada

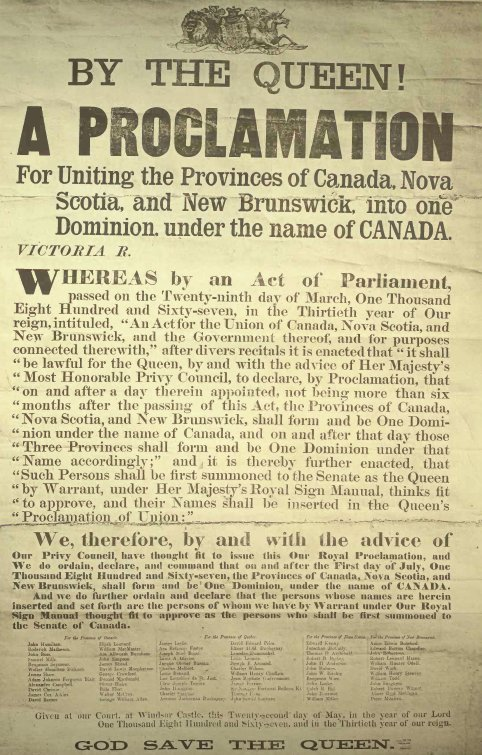
Royal Proclamation which brought the Act into force on July 1, 1867

Section 147 of the Constitution Act, 1867 (French: article 147 de la Loi constitutionnelle de 1867) is a provision of the Constitution of Canada dealing with the representation of Prince Edward Island and Newfoundland in the Senate of Canada, in the event either of those two colonies joined Canada after 1867.

The Constitution Act, 1867 is the constitutional statute which established Canada. Originally named the British North America Act, 1867, the Act continues to be the foundational statute for the Constitution of Canada, although it has been amended many times since 1867. It is now recognised as part of the supreme law of Canada.

== Constitution Act, 1867 ==
The Constitution Act, 1867 is part of the Constitution of Canada and thus part of the supreme law of Canada. It was the product of extensive negotiations by the governments of the British North American provinces in the 1860s. The Act sets out the constitutional framework of Canada, including the structure of the federal government and the powers of the federal government and the provinces. Originally enacted in 1867 by the British Parliament under the name the British North America Act, 1867, in 1982 the Act was brought under full Canadian control through the Patriation of the Constitution, and was renamed the Constitution Act, 1867. Since Patriation the Act can only be amended in Canada, under the amending formula set out in the Constitution Act, 1982.

== Text of section 147 ==
Section 147 reads:

As to Representation of Newfoundland and Prince Edward Island in the Senate
147 In case of the Admission of Newfoundland and Prince Edward Island, or either of them, each shall be entitled to a Representation in the Senate of Canada of Four Members, and (notwithstanding anything in this Act) in case of the Admission of Newfoundland the normal Number of Senators shall be Seventy-six and their maximum Number shall be Eighty-two; but Prince Edward Island when admitted shall be deemed to be comprised in the third of the Three Divisions into which Canada is, in relation to the Constitution of the Senate, divided by this Act, and accordingly, after the Admission of Prince Edward Island, whether Newfoundland is admitted or, not, the Representation of Nova Scotia and New Brunswick in the Senate shall, as Vacancies occur, be reduced from Twelve to Ten Members respectively, and the Representation of each of those Provinces shall not be increased at any Time beyond Ten, except under the Provisions of this Act for the Appointment of Three or Six additional Senators under the Direction of the Queen.

Section 147 is found in Part XI of the Constitution Act, 1867, dealing with the admission of other colonies.

== Amendments ==
Section 147 has been not been expressly amended since the Act was enacted in 1867, but the passage of the Constitution Act, 1915 and the Newfoundland Act have changed some of the provisions of the section.

== Purpose and interpretation ==
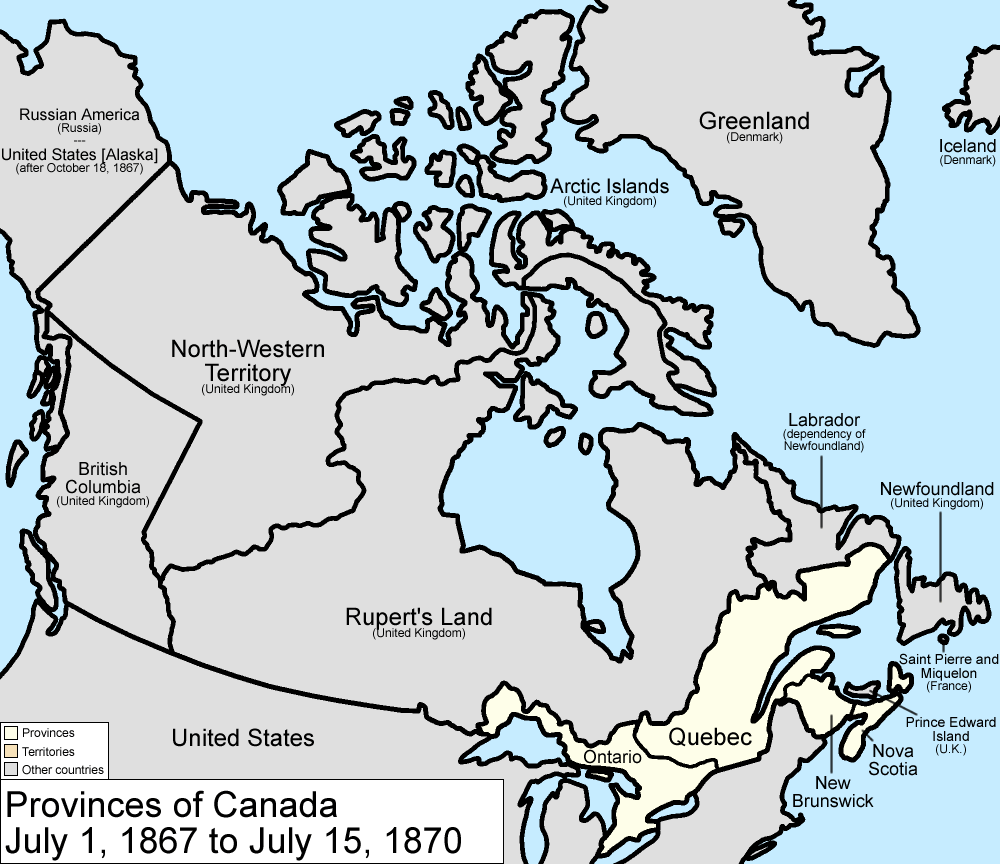
British North America at Confederation

In 1867, Confederation created the new country of Canada, as a federation of four provinces. The Province of Canada was split into the two provinces of Ontario and Quebec, and the two Maritime provinces of New Brunswick and Nova Scotia also joined.

There was some hope that the other two eastern British North American provinces, Newfoundland and Prince Edward Island, would join in the future. Both of them had participated in the negotiations for Confederation in 1864, but both had eventually declined to join. Prince Edward Island rejected Confederation after a change in government in 1865, while Newfoundland rejected it in 1866, after the 1865 provincial election returned a majority of members opposed to Confederation.

In 1866, the delegates from the Province of Canada, New Brunswick and Nova Scotia met for a final conference, the London Conference. They included a mechanism in the Constitution Act, 1867 for Prince Edward Island and Newfoundland to join Confederation in the future (section 146).

If either did so, one of the issues that would come up would be their representation in the Senate. The design of the Senate had been one of the most contentious issues, at both the Quebec Conference in 1864, and again at the London Conference, so it was advisable to deal with their Senate representation in advance of either of them joining Confederation.

At the Quebec Conference, the Fathers of Confederation had determined that the Senate would be based on regional representation, with Ontario, Quebec, and the Maritimes each having twenty-four senators. The Maritime division was originally envisaged as containing New Brunswick, Nova Scotia and Prince Edward Island. New Brunswick and Nova Scotia would each have ten senators, and Prince Edward Island would have four. Newfoundland would not be part of any regional division and would receive four senators.

At the London Conference, the delegates decided that the Maritime contingent would initially be divided evenly between New Brunswick and Nova Scotia, with each receiving twelve senators. However, if Prince Edward Island did join in the future, it would immediately receive four senators, and the representation for New Brunswick and Nova Scotia would gradually drop to ten senators each, as vacancies occurred in their Senate delegations. That would mean that the Maritime division in the Senate would eventually be twenty-four, with the seats allocated between the three Maritime provinces as originally planned at the Quebec Conference.

The delegates to the London Conference also concluded that if Newfoundland joined, it would receive four Senate seats, as planned at the Quebec Conference. However, in 1915, the Constitution Act, 1915 provided that each of the four western provinces would have six senators. That Act increased Newfoundland’s potential Senate representation to six as well. Newfoundland received six Senate seats when it joined Confederation in 1949.

== Related provisions ==
Section 22 of the Act sets out the total number of senators and the four senatorial divisions.

Section 146 of the Act provides for the admission of Newfoundland and Prince Edward to Confederation.

The Constitution Act, 1915 changed the number of senators available to Newfoundland, in the event of admission, from four to six.

When Newfoundland eventually joined Confederation in 1949, the Newfoundland Act provided that Newfoundland received six Senate seats.
