= Section 22 of the Constitution Act, 1867 =

Provision of the Constitution of Canada

British North America Act, 1867

Section 22 of the Constitution Act, 1867 (French: Article 22 de la Loi constitutionnelle de 1867) is a provision of the Constitution of Canada setting out the number and distribution of seats in the Senate of Canada, the upper house of the Parliament of Canada.

The Constitution Act, 1867 is the constitutional statute which established Canada. Originally named the British North America Act, 1867, the Act continues to be the foundational statute for the Constitution of Canada, although it has been amended many times since 1867. It is now recognised as part of the supreme law of Canada.

== Constitution Act, 1867 ==
The Constitution Act, 1867 is part of the Constitution of Canada and thus part of the "supreme law of Canada". The Act sets out the constitutional framework of Canada, including the structure of the federal government and the powers of the federal government and the provinces. It was the product of extensive negotiations between the provinces of British North America at the Charlottetown Conference in 1864, the Quebec Conference in 1864, and the London Conference in 1866. Those conferences were followed by consultations with the British government in 1867. The Act was then enacted by the British Parliament under the name the British North America Act, 1867. In 1982 the Act was brought under full Canadian control through the Patriation of the Constitution, and was renamed the Constitution Act, 1867. Since Patriation, the Act can only be amended in Canada, under the amending formula set out in the Constitution Act, 1982.

== Text of section 22 ==
Section 22 reads:

Representation of Provinces in Senate
22 In relation to the Constitution of the Senate Canada shall be deemed to consist of Four Divisions:

1 Ontario;
2 Quebec;
3 The Maritime Provinces, Nova Scotia and New Brunswick, and Prince Edward Island;
4 The Western Provinces of Manitoba, British Columbia, Saskatchewan, and Alberta;

which Four Divisions shall (subject to the Provisions of this Act) be equally represented in the Senate as follows: Ontario by twenty-four senators; Quebec by twenty-four senators; the Maritime Provinces and Prince Edward Island by twenty-four senators, ten thereof representing Nova Scotia, ten thereof representing New Brunswick, and four thereof representing Prince Edward Island; the Western Provinces by twenty-four senators, six thereof representing Manitoba, six thereof representing British Columbia, six thereof representing Saskatchewan, and six thereof representing Alberta; Newfoundland shall be entitled to be represented in the Senate by six members; the Yukon Territory, the Northwest Territories and Nunavut shall be entitled to be represented in the Senate by one member each.

In the Case of Quebec each of the Twenty-four Senators representing that Province shall be appointed for One of the Twenty-four Electoral Divisions of Lower Canada specified in Schedule A to Chapter One of the Consolidated Statutes of Canada.

Section 22 is found in Part IV of the Constitution Act, 1867, dealing with the legislative power of the federal Parliament. It has been amended by implication many times since 1867, and once by express amendment in 1915. The wording of section 22 has not been formally altered by the implied amendments, but the amendments since 1915 have been consolidated to the present wording by the federal Department of Justice in the online version of the Constitution Act, 1867. (Note: This practice of consolidating implied amendments was implemented in 1956 by Elmer Driedger, QC, Assistant Deputy Minister of Justice and Parliamentary Counsel, in: A Consolidation of The British North America Acts, 1867 to 1952, (Queen's Printer (Canada), 1956), p. iii.)

== Legislative history ==
The participants at the Charlottetown Conference, 1864: Canada West (Ontario) in pink; Canada East (Quebec) in blue; New Brunswick in green; Nova Scotia in red; Prince Edward Island in black

The basic allocation of seats was determined at the Quebec Conference in October, 1864. The new provinces of Ontario and Quebec would each receive twenty-four seats. The Maritime provinces would receive twenty-four, with ten each to Nova Scotia and New Brunswick, and four to Prince Edward Island. Not part of the Maritime division, Newfoundland would receive four seats.

At the London Conference in December, 1866, the numbers were somewhat different, since neither Prince Edward Island nor Newfoundland were in attendance. The London Resolutions provided that Ontario and Quebec would each receive twenty-four seats, while the two Maritime provinces, Nova Scotia and New Brunswick, would receive twelve seats each.

However, the London Resolutions also provided that if Prince Edward Island were to join Confederation at a later date, it would receive four seats in the Maritime division, and Nova Scotia and New Brunswick would be reduced to ten seats each, as senators from those provinces retired or died. If Newfoundland later joined, it would receive four seats, not part of the Maritime division.

This arrangement was followed in the rough draft of the British North America bill prepared by a sub-committee of the London Conference, composed of the four provincial attorneys general. (Note: The four attorneys general were John A. Macdonald, Canada West; George-Étienne Cartier, Canada East; William Alexander Henry, Nova Scotia; and Charles Fisher, New Brunswick.)

A different approach was taken in the initial draft of the bill, in response to concerns raised by the Colonial Secretary, Lord Carnarvon. The initial draft did not use the concept of senate divisions, and simply allocated twenty-four seats each to Ontario and Quebec, and ten each to Nova Scotia and New Brunswick. Although provision was made for the eventual admission of Prince Edward Island and Newfoundland, there was no predetermination of the number of seats they would receive. Their representation would be left to the British Cabinet to determine at the time of admission. The initial draft also proposed that instead of appointments for life, senators would only hold their seats for ten years, with staggered retirement ages.

The third draft of the bill took yet another approach. It restored the concept of senate divisions, with the same numbers as in the rough draft, and the proposal for four seats for Prince Edward Island and Newfoundland in the event of admission. Life tenure was restored, instead of ten year terms. However, the third draft provided for a temporary expansion of the Senate, in case of a disagreement between the Commons and the Senate. The fourth draft took a similar approach. The provisions were finalised in the fifth and final draft.

== Purpose and interpretation ==
=== Regional allocation of Senate seats ===
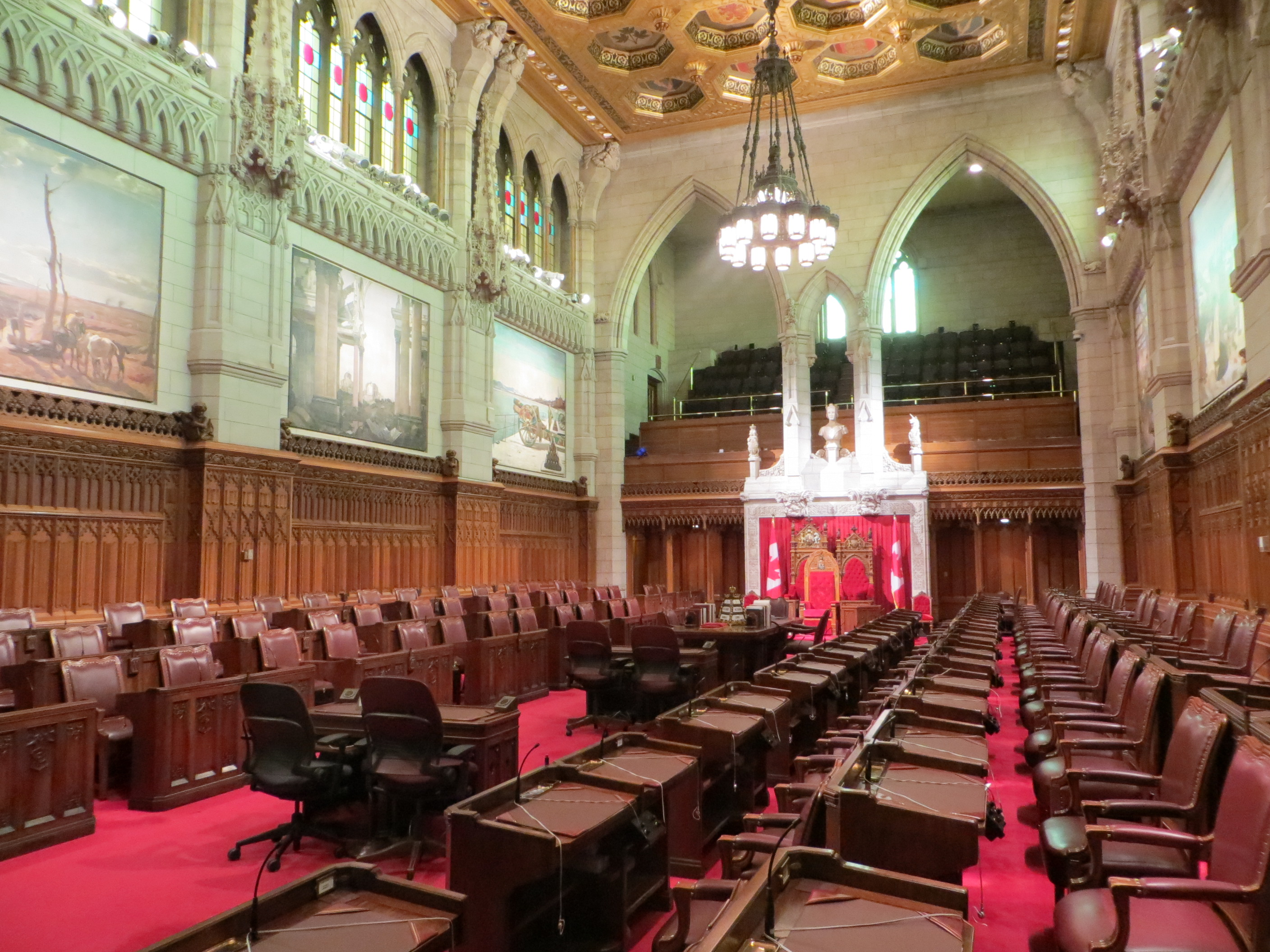
Permanent Senate chamber, Centre Block of Parliament buildings

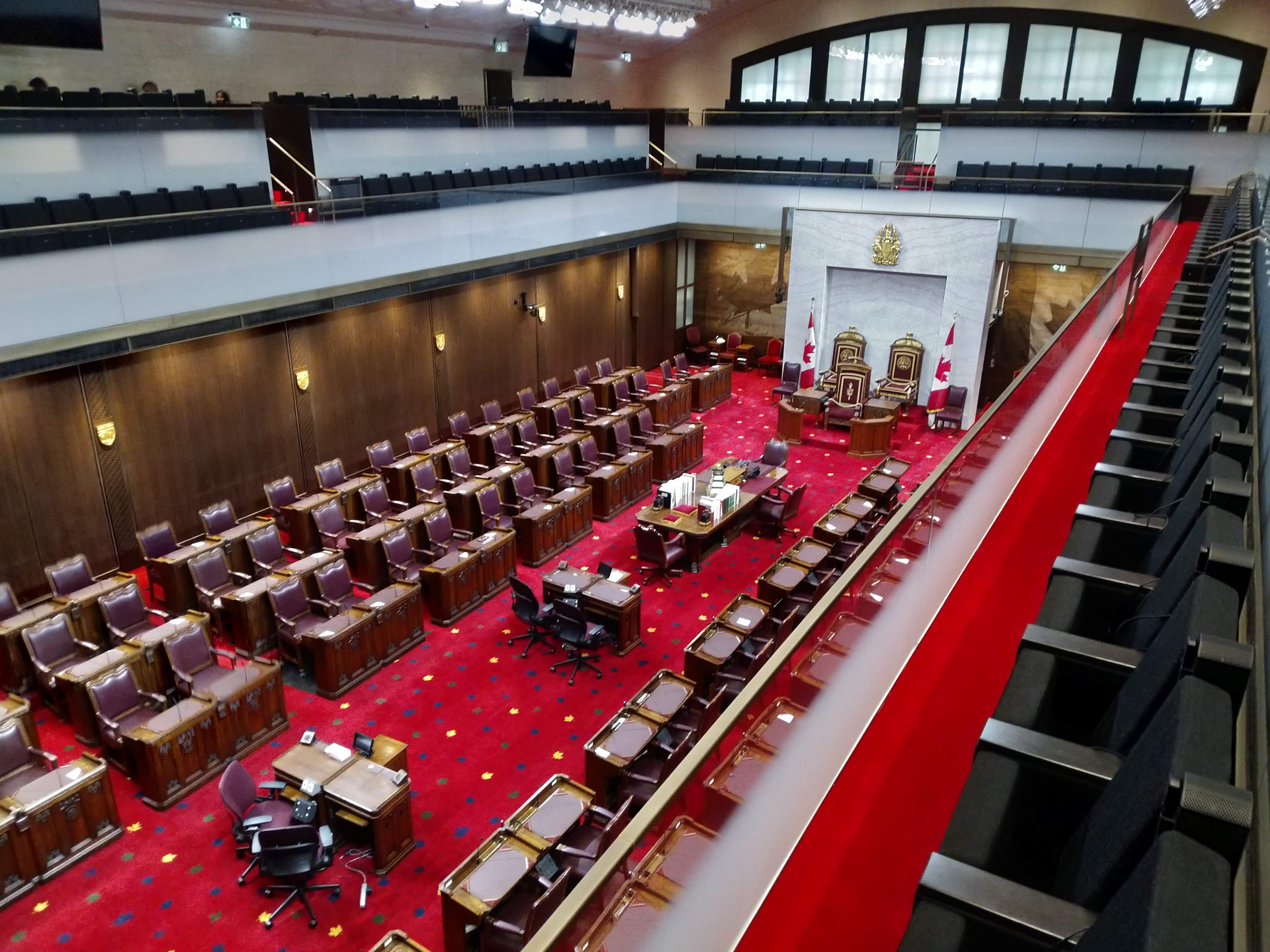
Temporary Senate chamber in the Senate of Canada Building (post-2019), pending renovations to the Centre Block

The structure of the Senate was one of the most heavily debated issues considered by the Fathers of Confederation. There was general agreement on some points. They agreed that the Senate would follow the model of the existing provincial bicameral parliaments. Their upper houses, called legislative councils, traditionally were appointed, not elected. The members of the new Senate (called the Legislative Council in some of the drafts) would similarly be appointed for life, not elected. This was seen as a return to British constitutional models, instead of the experiments with elected upper houses in the Province of Canada (Note: The Province of Canada had been formed in 1841 by the merger of Lower Canada and Upper Canada. Under Confederation, the Province of Canada was split into the two provinces of Quebec and Ontario.) and Prince Edward Island.

The major question was how the seats would be allocated. That issue was debated at length in all three of the conferences leading to Confederation: the Charlottetown Conference (September 1864); the Quebec Conference (October 1864); and the London Conference (December 1866). The issue also arose in the Confederation Debates in the Parliament of the Province of Canada. For many of the delegates, the Senate, as a counterbalance to the lower house based on population, was considered the heart of the proposed federation.

At the Charlottetown Conference, the Fathers of Confederation initially agreed that the Senate seats would be allocated by three regions, not by province. The new provinces of Ontario and Quebec would each be considered a region. The three Maritime provinces would be the third region. Each region would have the same number of seats, with the seats in the Maritime region divided between the three Maritime provinces: Nova Scotia, New Brunswick, and Prince Edward Island.

This approach rejected the idea of an upper house based on provincial equality, unlike the Senate of the United States, where each state had equal representation. The general feeling amongst the delegates was that state equality had been one of the factors contributing to the American Civil War, and should not be followed in the proposed new federation. John A. Macdonald, co-premier of the Province of Canada, was a particularly strong advocate of this position.

Another point favouring regional representation was that there was considerable population imbalance between the provinces. Even taken together, the three Maritime provinces had only a fifth of the population of either Ontario or Quebec, so there was a concern that provincial equality would give the Maritimes too much political weight in the upper house. The representatives from Canada East (previously Lower Canada; now Quebec) insisted on regional representation for this reason, with equality between Ontario and Quebec.

=== Quebec Conference ===
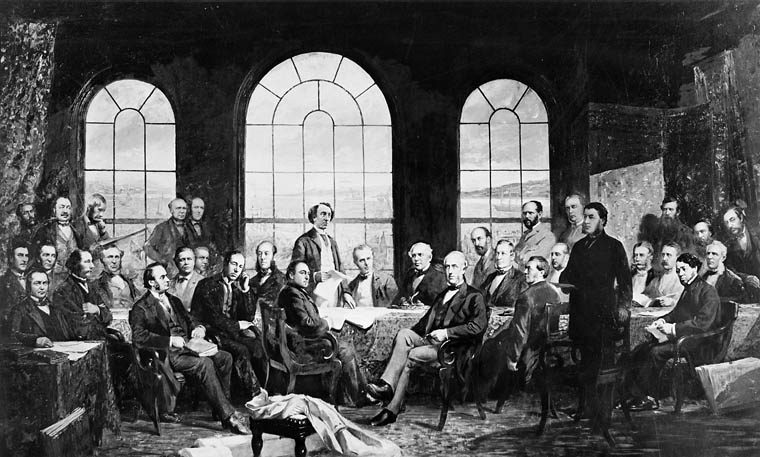
The Fathers of Confederation at the Quebec Conference, October 1864

The discussion on the Senate took a full week at the Quebec Conference and came close to breaking up the negotiations.

The delegates from the Province of Canada had already advanced the concept of regional representation at the Charlottetown Conference in September 1864. The Maritime delegates had accepted that approach in principle. However, when Macdonald introduced the proposed resolution for seat allocation at the Quebec Conference, he raised a new issue: the representation of Newfoundland in the Senate. Newfoundland had not sent any delegates to the Charlottetown Conference, but did send delegates to the Quebec Conference. Since Newfoundland had not been present at Charlottetown, no provision had been made at that time for its representation in the Senate.

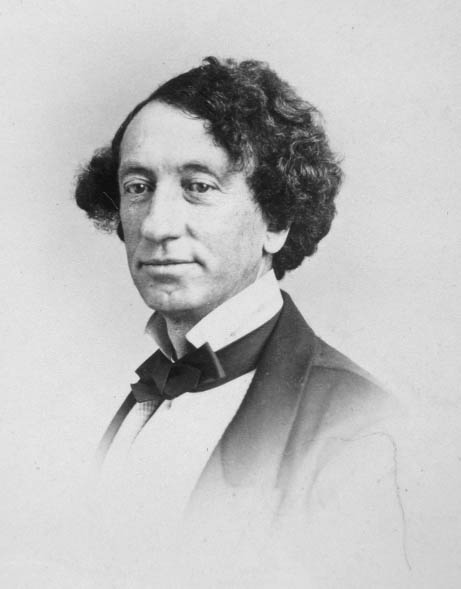
John A. Macdonald, co-premier of the Province of Canada, and leading figure in the conferences and debates over Confederation

To deal with this issue, Macdonald proposed that Newfoundland be included in the Maritime division. That approach would bring the Maritime division closer to the populations of Ontario and Quebec, but by dividing the seats between four provinces rather than three, would reduce the number of seats each Maritime province would receive. The Maritimers immediately protested that this was a substantive change, not what they had agreed upon at Charlottetown.

That response in turn reopened the concept of regional representation. The Maritimers knew that the Canadians would insist on representation by population in the lower house, and therefore they saw the upper house as a crucial guarantee of their interests. Maritime delegates, particularly those from Prince Edward Island, advanced a number of different options to increase their influence in the upper house, but they also shied away from the idea of equal provincial representation on the American model. Given the general consensus against equality of representation, they had no other alternative to put forward than regional representation.

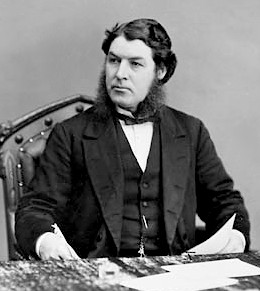
Premier Tupper of Nova Scotia, who proposed a separate seat allocation for Newfoundland

Eventually, the Canadians gave way on the proposal to include Newfoundland in the Maritime division. Instead, they gave their support to a motion from Charles Tupper, Premier of Nova Scotia, maintaining the Maritime division as only Nova Scotia, New Brunswick, and Prince Edward Island, with a similar seat allocation as discussed at Charlottetown. Newfoundland would not be included in any division, and would receive a separate seat allocation.

At Charlottetown, the Canadians had proposed that each division would receive twenty seats, for a Senate composed of sixty seats. At Quebec, the delegates instead settled on twenty-four seats for each region. That approach followed the example of the Legislative Council of the Province of Canada, where the two sections, Canada East and Canada West, each had twenty-four seats. In the new Senate, Ontario and Quebec would each receive twenty-four seats. The two larger Maritime provinces, Nova Scotia and New Brunswick, would receive ten seats, and Prince Edward Island would have four seats. Newfoundland would have four seats, but would not be part of the Maritime division. The Senate would therefore have a total of seventy-six seats.

=== Confederation Debates, 1865 ===
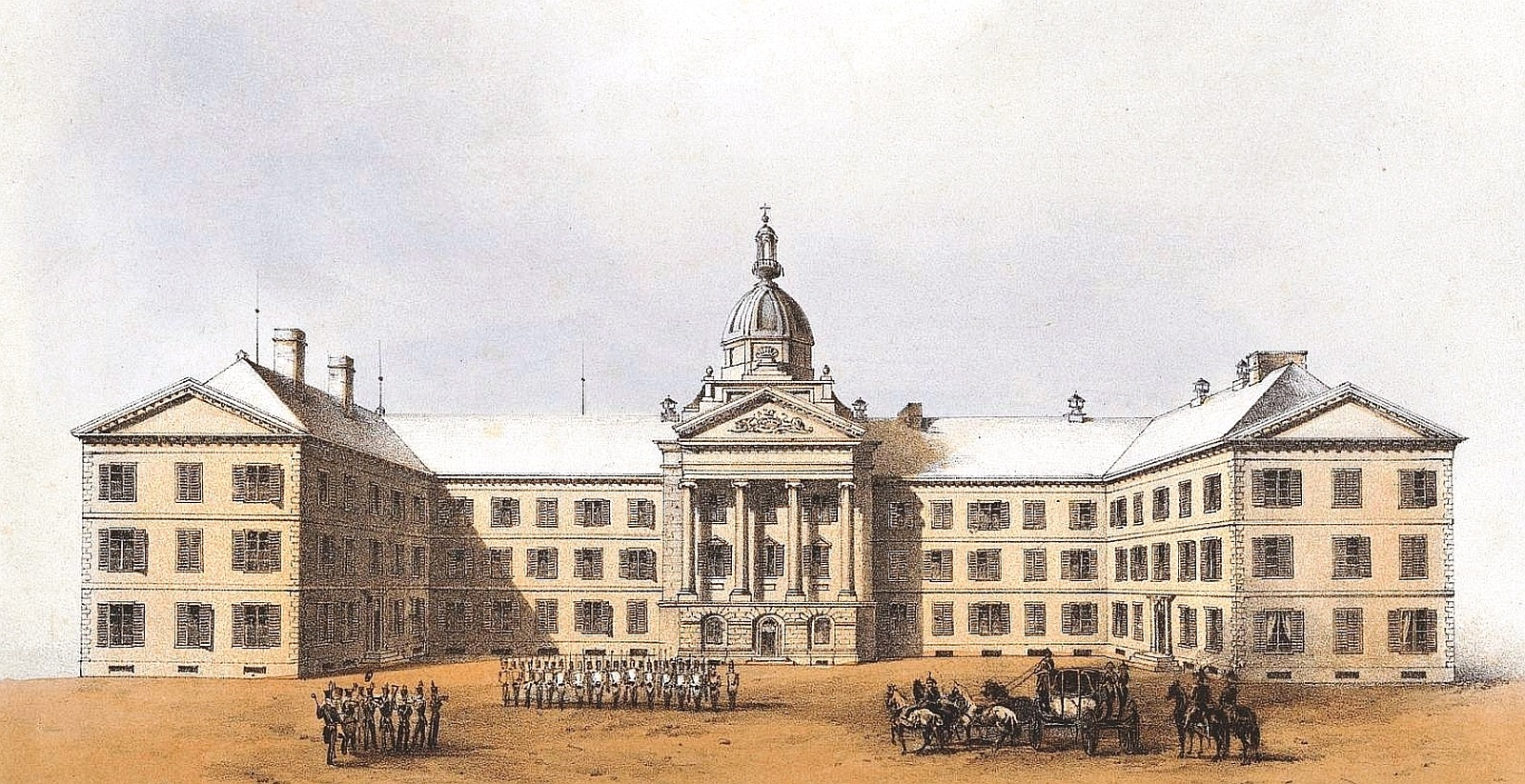
Old Parliament buildings, Quebec, site of the Confederation Debates in the Province of Canada

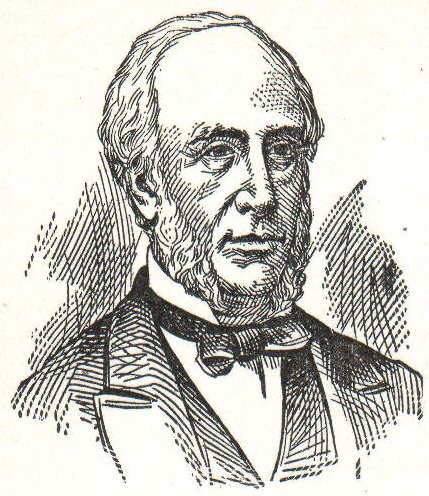
George Brown, who argued strongly for representation by population in the lower house, and regional representation in the upper house

In early 1865, the Parliament of the Province of Canada held a lengthy debate on the Quebec Resolutions, ultimately approving the proposed federation. Two of the leading members of the government, Macdonald and George Brown, explained the importance of the regional allocation of seats in the Senate. Macdonald stated:

In order to protect local interests and to prevent sectional jealousies, it was found requisite that the three great divisions into which British North America is separated, should be represented in the Upper House on the principle of equality. There are three great sections, having different interests, in this proposed Confederation.
...
To the Upper House is to be confided the protection of sectional interests: therefore is it that the three great divisions are there equally represented for the purpose of defending such interests against the combinations of majorities in the Assembly [i.e. the House of Commons].

Brown made the same point:

But the very essence of our compact is that the union shall be federal and not legislative. Our Lower Canada friends have agreed to give us representation by population in the Lower House, on the express condition that they shall have equality in the Upper House. On no other condition could we have advanced a step; and, for my part, I am quite willing they should have it. In maintaining the existing sectional boundaries and handing over the control of local matters to local bodies, we recognize, to a certain extent, a diversity of interests; and it is quite natural that the protection for those interests, by equality in the Upper Chamber, should be demanded by the less numerous provinces.

=== London Conference, 1866 ===
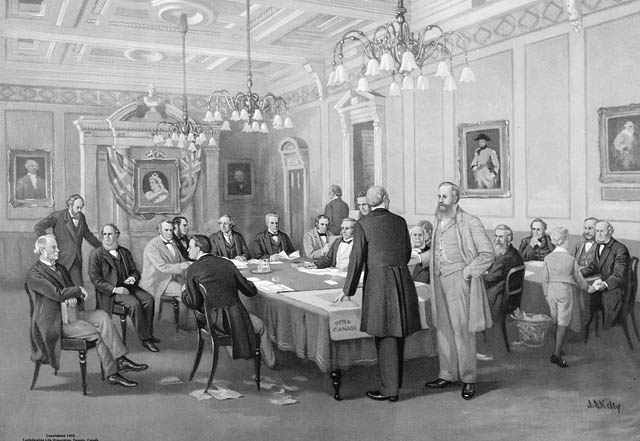
The Fathers of Confederation at the London Conference in the Westminster Palace Hotel, December 1866

The third and final conference on Confederation was held in London in December 1866, followed by discussions by the delegates with Lord Carnarvon, the colonial secretary, in the first three months of 1867. Two significant issues concerning the Senate came up in London: the absence of Prince Edward Island and Newfoundland, and the question of how to resolve deadlocks between the Senate and the House of Commons.

==== Absence of Prince Edward Island and Newfoundland ====
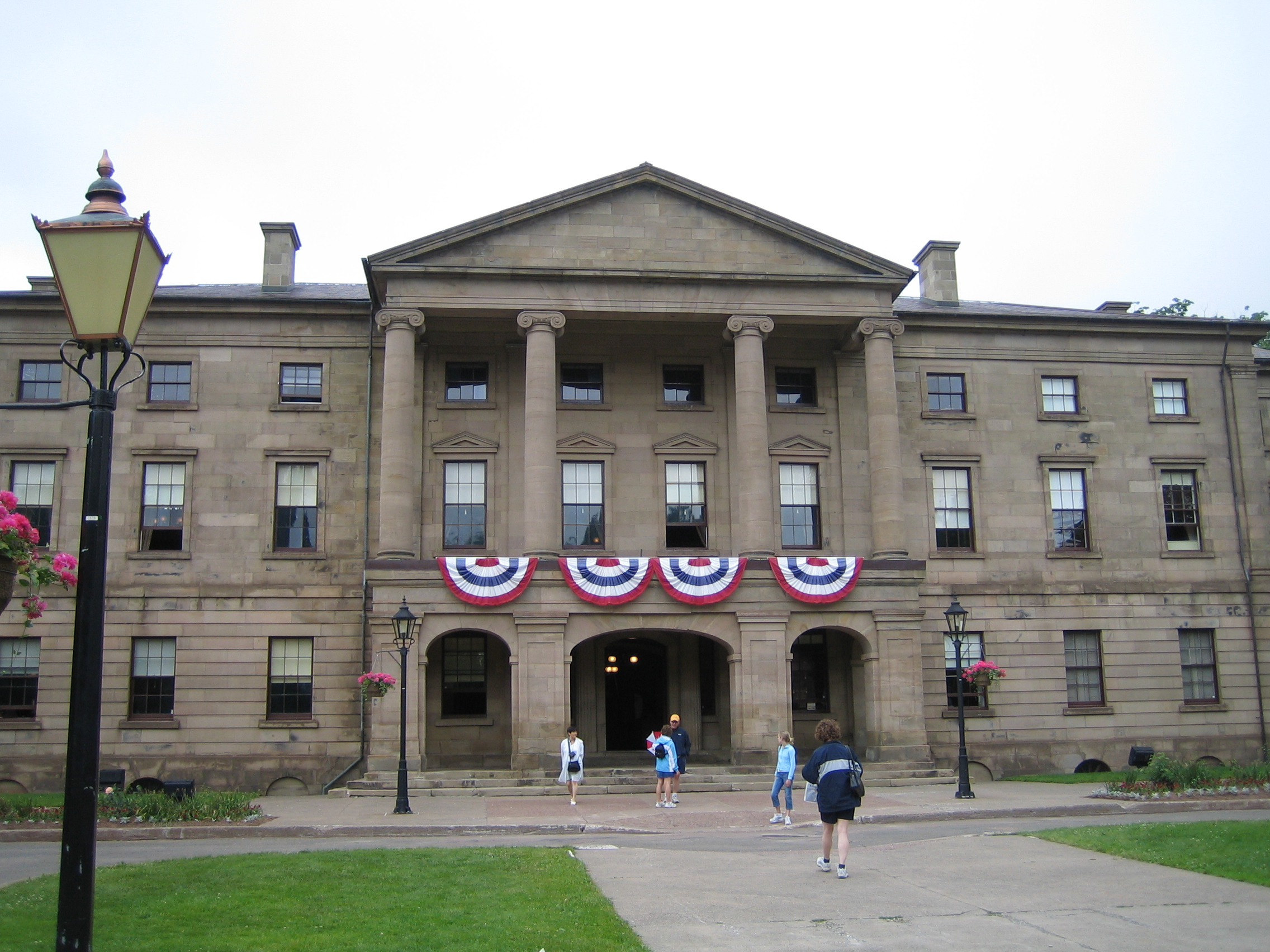
Province House, Prince Edward Island: Site of the Charlottetown Conference in 1864 and the rejection of Confederation in 1865 and 1866

After the Quebec Conference in October 1864, Prince Edward Island and Newfoundland both rejected Confederation. In Prince Edward Island, there were two separate votes held in the House of Assembly, one in 1865 and another in 1866; in both votes, the Assembly rejected Confederation. In the Newfoundland election in 1865, the voters returned a majority of members opposed to Confederation. In the new Assembly, Confederation was postponed indefinitely.

As a result, when the London Conference convened in December 1866 there were only delegates from the Province of Canada, New Brunswick and Nova Scotia. The numbers in the Senate were accordingly re-drawn. The Maritime division continued to have twenty-four seats, but the seats were now divided evenly between New Brunswick and Nova Scotia. Each was to receive twelve seats.

However, the delegates did not give up hope that Prince Edward Island and Newfoundland might be persuaded to join at some date in the future. They accordingly decided that if Prince Edward Island were to join, the Island would receive four senators immediately and the representation for Nova Scotia and New Brunswick would gradually decline to ten seats each, through attrition. Newfoundland would also be entitled to four seats if it decided to join. These contingencies were eventually set out in section 147 of the act.

==== Deadlocks between the House of Commons and the Senate ====
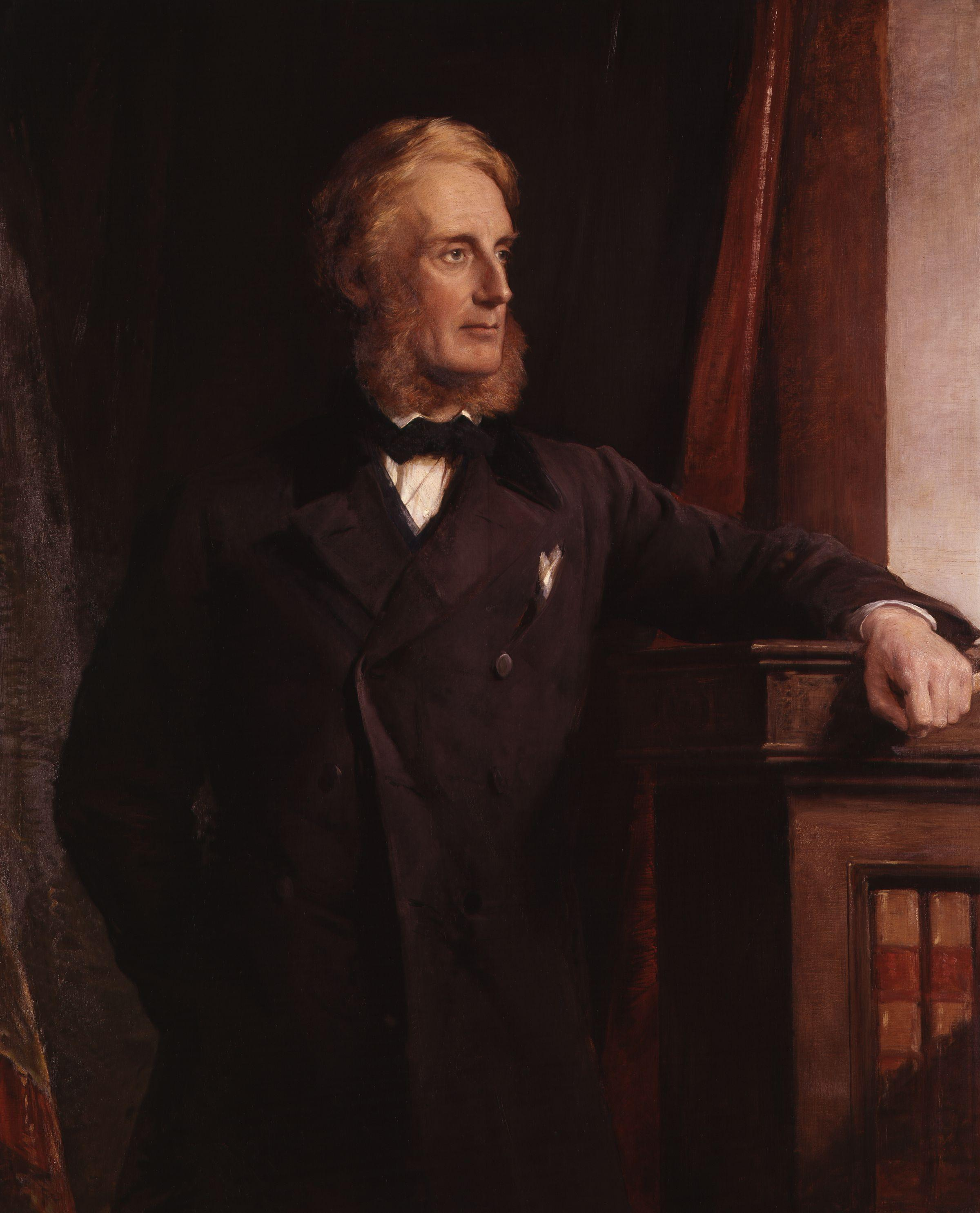
Edward Cardwell, the colonial secretary who raised the concern about deadlocks in 1864

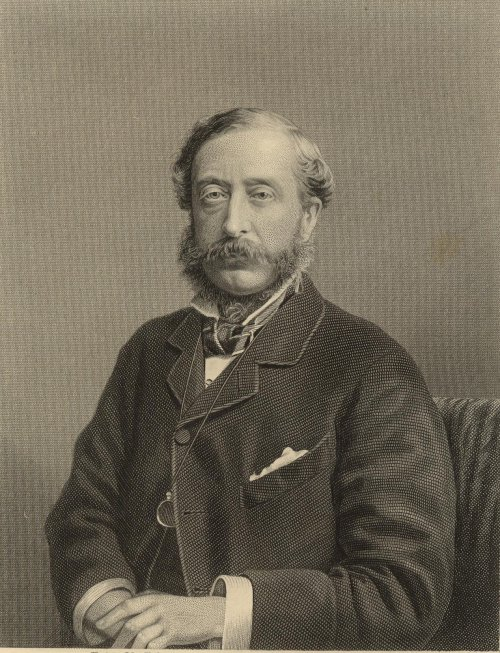
The Earl of Carnarvon, colonial secretary from 1866 onwards, who continued to raise the issue of deadlock

The second issue which came up in London was the problem of potential deadlocks between the House of Commons and the Senate. The combination of a set number of Senate seats and no provision for additional appointments meant there would be no obvious way to resolve a deadlock between the two houses. This issue had come up in discussions at the Quebec Conference, but had not been resolved. (Note: There was a recent precedent from the Province of Canada on this point. In 1849, Governor General Lord Elgin had appointed twelve additional legislative councillors to ensure the passage of the Rebellion Losses Bill, which had been a highly contentious legislative proposal. The effect was to drastically weaken the power of the Legislative Council: Robert A. MacKay, The Unreformed Senate of Canada, (McClelland and Stewart, 1963 (revised ed.) , p. 28.)) The colonial secretary, Edward Cardwell, had raised this issue in a letter to Governor General Lord Monck after the Quebec Conference, indicating that the British government generally approved of the Quebec Resolutions, but were concerned about the lack of a method to break a deadlock.

The issue came up again at the London Conference, but the delegates from the Maritimes and Lower Canada, fearful of being swamped in the Senate by a government dominated by Upper Canada, continued to view the rigid allocation of Senate seats as a key guarantee. In their view, a Senate based on three separate and equal divisions, and no general power in the Crown to appoint additional senators, was essential to the federal nature of the proposed constitution:

- Charles Tupper of Nova Scotia: "... this is not a Legislative Union, and we had sectional and local differences. Lower Canada and the Lower Provinces require some guarantee."
- Leonard Tilley of New Brunswick: "I agree with Dr Tupper. Our protection is as now settled. The objection was that Upper Canada would swamp the Lower Provinces. What is the Crown? The Government of the day."
- Hector Langevin of Lower Canada: "Lower Canada insists that each of its present divisions shall have a representative in the Council, that is the existing divisions".
- Adams Archibald of Nova Scotia: regional representation was "at the root of the whole scheme the spirit of which is that each Province shall be sectionally represented in the Legislative Council."

However, the new colonial secretary, Lord Carnarvon, (Note: Cardwell had been the colonial secretary from 1864 to 1866 in the Liberal governments of Viscount Palmerston and Earl Russell. Russell's government was defeated on a no confidence vote in June 1866, replaced by the Conservative government of the Earl of Derby. Carnarvon was the colonial secretary in the new government: Gilding,"The Silent Framers of British North American Union: The Colonial Office and Canadian Confederation, 1851–67", p. 377.) continued to be concerned about the rigidity of the proposed Senate, with no method to resolve a dispute between the Senate and the House of Commons. In Britain, that problem could be resolved by the appointment of additional members in the House of Lords, favourable to the government majority in the House of Commons. (Note: Appointment of additional peers had been seriously considered to resolve the dispute between the House of Lords and the House of Commons over the Great Reform Bill of 1832, but had not been necessary, as a political agreement was reached: J.R.M Butler, The Passing of the Great Reform Bill (1st ed., 1914; new impression: Frank Cass, 1964), pp. 402–415; Philip Ziegler, William IV (Fontana, 1973), pp. 205–222.) Carnarvon therefore proposed that there be greater flexibility, both by appointing the senators for terms of ten years, rather than life, and by permitting the appointment of additional senators in the event of a dispute between the Commons and the Senate. This issue caused friction between the Colonial Office and the delegates right to the end of the drafting process.

The structure of the Senate had been one of the most significant political accommodations at the Quebec Conference. Making major changes to the composition of the Senate, particularly by a general power to add new members in certain cases, threatened the entire political accord. However, the concerns raised by the British government, coupled with dissents by some of the delegates from Upper Canada (notably William McDougall and William Howland) meant that some compromise had to be found.

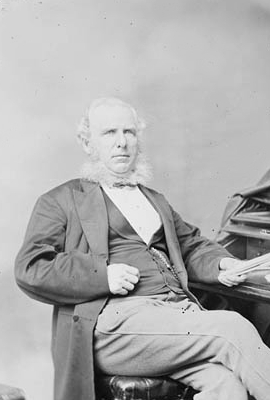
Jonathan McCully of Nova Scotia, who proposed the provision for temporary expansion of the Senate

In discussions between the delegates and Carnarvon, Macdonald took the lead on resolving the issue which threatened to break up the general agreement. Different approaches were considered. For example, on January 30, 1867, the delegates passed a motion supporting an expansion of the Senate if the upper house rejected bills from the House of Commons. However, just two days later a different approach was adopted. Early in the conference, a Nova Scotia delegate, Jonathan McCully, had proposed that there be a power to temporarily expand the Senate by a limited number of members. Now Macdonald and McCully put forward that proposal, suggesting that either three or six members, drawn equally from the three divisions could be appointed if necessary. The appointments would be made by the monarch, at the request of the Canadian government. No further appointments could be made to a division until the number of senators for that division reached its normal allotment, as senators died or retired. While the British government thought there should be provision for expansion by up to twelve additional senators, Macdonald was able to persuade the delegates and Carnarvon to accept his proposal, with a maximum of six new senators. After further discussion, that became the final form of the Senate.

In practice, the provision for temporary expansion has not proven to be as important as the British government had expected. The power to appoint additional senators has only been used once. In 1990, the Progressive Conservative government of Brian Mulroney used the provision to appoint additional senators, to ensure the passage of the goods and services tax.

=== Creation of the Western division, 1915 ===
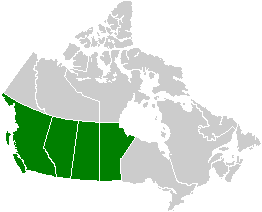
The four western provinces: British Columbia, Alberta, Saskatchewan, Manitoba (from left to right). Each province has six senators.

From 1870 to 1905, four new provinces joined Confederation in western Canada: Manitoba in 1870, British Columbia in 1871, and Saskatchewan and Alberta in 1905. There was variation in the number of senators each province received.

In 1915, the federal government decided to create a new Western division in the Senate, treating each of the four western provinces equally. Each of the western provinces would receive six senators, and the Western division would be added to the process for additional senators. The power for temporary expansion of the Senate would be amended to permit the appointment of either four or eight senators, drawn equally from the four divisions.

At that time, constitutional amendments could only be made by the British Parliament, on the request of the two houses of the Parliament of Canada. The Canadian House of Commons and the Senate passed an Address to the King, requesting that the British Parliament pass the necessary amendment to the Constitution Act, 1867, as set out in the Address. The British Parliament duly passed the amendment, as the British North America Act, 1915 (now the Constitution Act, 1915).

=== Representation of the territories in the Senate ===
The three northern territories: Yukon, Northwest Territories, and Nunavut (from left to right). Each territory has one senator.

In 1870, Canada acquired Rupert’s Land and the North-Western Territory from the Hudson's Bay Company. The federal Parliament created the North-West Territories to govern the expanded territory, but did not have the constitutional authority to provide for territorial representation in Parliament.

In 1886, the House of Commons and the Senate passed an Address to the Queen, requesting a constitutional amendment to authorize the federal Parliament to provide for territorial representation in the Senate. The British Parliament passed the British North America Act, 1886 (now the Constitution Act, 1886) to carry out that request.

Using this power, the federal Parliament passed legislation for territorial representation in the Senate: two seats in 1887, increased to four seats in 1903. However, with the creation of Saskatchewan and Alberta out of the southern portion of the North-West Territories in 1905, the territories lost their Senate representation. In 1975, Parliament provided that the Northwest Territories would receive two senators, and Yukon would receive one senator. In 1999, on the creation of Nunavut from the eastern portion of the Northwest Territories, Nunavut received one senator, and the Northwest Territories were reduced to one senator.

=== Maximum size of the Senate ===
In recognition of the power for temporary expansion of the Senate, the act sets an absolute maximum number of senators. Section 28 provides that the Senate shall have no more than 113 senators.

=== Summary of changes to the number of Senate seats ===
Since 1867, the number of Senate seats has increased, as new provinces and territories have joined Confederation. The increase in numbers is as follows:

Ontario and Quebec: each has always had twenty-four seats under section 22.

Nova Scotia and New Brunswick: each originally had twelve seats, but after the admission of Prince Edward Island in 1873, their seats were reduced to ten each by attrition, to maintain the Maritime division at a total of twenty-four seats.

Manitoba: originally had two seats on joining Confederation in 1870; increased to three, then four, as population grew; increased to six on the creation of the Western division in 1915.

British Columbia: originally had three seats on joining Confederation in 1871; increased to six seats on the creation of the Western division in 1915.

Prince Edward Island: received four seats on admission to Confederation in 1873.

Saskatchewan and Alberta: originally had four seats each on joining Confederation in 1905; increased to six seats each on the creation of the Western division in 1915.

Newfoundland: received six seats on joining Confederation in 1949.

Northwest Territories: received two seats in 1887, increased to four seats in 1903; lost them after Saskatchewan and Alberta joined Confederation in 1905; received two seats in 1975; reduced to one seat in 1999, when Nunavut was created from the eastern Northwest Territories.

Yukon: received one seat in 1975.

Nunavut: received one seat on creation in 1999.

== Related provisions of the Constitution Act, 1867 ==
Section 21 of the Act provides that the normal maximum size of the Senate is 105 members.

Section 26 provides for the temporary expansion of the Senate by four or eight senators, drawn equally from each of the four divisions.

Section 27 provides for the gradual reduction of the Senate after a temporary expansion.

Section 28 provides that the Senate shall not have more than 113 members.

Section 147 provided that Prince Edward Island would receive four Senate seats on admission to Confederation, and the Senate representation of Nova Scotia and New Brunswick would be reduced to ten each by attrition. It also provided that Newfoundland would receive four Senate seats on admission to Confederation.
