= British Columbia Terms of Union =

Part of the Constitution of Canada adding BC

British Columbia Terms of Union Conditions de l’adhésion de la Colombie-Britannique

Part of the Constitution of Canada
- Citation: SC 1872, p. lxxxiv; RSC 1985, App. II, No. 10
- Territorial extent: Canada
- Considered by: Negotiations between representatives of Canada and the Colony of British Columbia; Senate of Canada; House of Commons of Canada; Legislative Council of British Columbia
- Enacted by: Queen-in-Council (UK)
- Enacted: May 16, 1871
- Assented to by: Victoria
- Commenced: July 20, 1871
- Authorizing legislation: Constitution Act, 1867, s. 146

Text of statute as originally enacted
- Status: Current legislation

The British Columbia Terms of Union (French: Conditions de l’adhésion de la Colombie-Britannique) is one of the enactments which make up the Constitution of Canada. It united the Colony of British Columbia with Canada, and contains the terms and conditions of the union that had been negotiated between the governments of BC and Canada.

After the proposed terms of union were negotiated by the representatives of the governments of British Columbia and Canada, they were presented and debated in the Legislative Council of British Columbia and the Canadian House of Commons and Senate. Upon ratification by the legislative bodies, the terms of union were forwarded to the British government in London. The British Queen-in-Council adopted the terms of union, as a statutory order enacted under the authority of section 146 of the British North America Act, 1867 (now the Constitution Act, 1867). Once enacted by the order-in-council, the terms of union had the same constitutional force as if enacted as part of the Constitution Act, 1867 itself.

The Terms of Union came into force on July 20, 1871. On that date, British Columbia became the sixth province of Canada. The Terms of Union continue in force as the foundation for British Columbia's constitutional status within Canada.

== Negotiations and terms ==
The confederation agreement was negotiated in the Canadian capital of Ottawa between the Colony of British Columbia (on the west coast of North America, bordering the Pacific Ocean) and the new Dominion of Canada, extending its territory and reach continent-wide, coast to coast. The Terms of Union agreement document consists of 14 articles.

For British Columbia, financial concerns were at the top of the list in negotiating union with Canada. The Dominion assumed BC's debts and liabilities, provided BC with a generous subsidy and an annual per capita grant, based on an inflated population figure. Canada also agreed to pay salaries of supreme court and county court judges, and pensions of previous colonial civil servants whose positions might be affected by the union with the Canada. Other articles dealt with parliamentary representation, postal services, customs tariffs, interprovincial trade, lighthouses and facilities such as a quarantine medical station and a criminal penitentiary. The terms promised a transcontinental railway and a first-class graving dock for ship repair of a port on the Pacific Ocean coast at Esquimalt.

The Terms of Union also addressed Indian land policy in a manner that would effectively perpetuate BC's pre-Confederation practices, through "a policy as liberal as that hitherto pursued by the British Columbia Government shall be continued by the Dominion Government after the Union". Post union, Canada learned that the policies of British Columbia with regard to lands and Indigenous peoples were not at all "liberal". This foundational ambiguity related to the Indian Land Question, settlement and occupation of unceded lands, is a defining characteristic of BC in Confederation and has ongoing implications for society and economy.
