= Section 146 of the Constitution Act, 1867 =

Provision of the Constitution of Canada

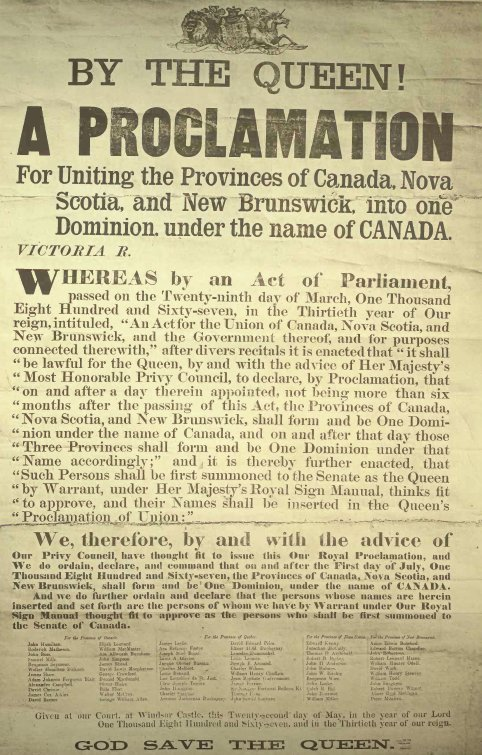

Section 146 of the Constitution Act, 1867 (French: article 146 de la Loi constitutionnelle de 1867) is a provision of the Constitution of Canada authorising the expansion of Canada by admitting British Columbia, Newfoundland, Prince Edward Island, Rupert's Land, and the North-Western Territory into Canada.

The Constitution Act, 1867 is the constitutional statute which established Canada. Originally named the British North America Act, 1867, the Act continues to be the foundational statute for the Constitution of Canada, although it has been amended many times since 1867. It is now recognised as part of the supreme law of Canada.

== Constitution Act, 1867 ==
The Constitution Act, 1867 is part of the Constitution of Canada and thus part of the supreme law of Canada. It was the product of extensive negotiations by the governments of the British North American provinces in the 1860s. The Act sets out the constitutional framework of Canada, including the structure of the federal government and the powers of the federal government and the provinces. Originally enacted in 1867 by the British Parliament under the name the British North America Act, 1867, in 1982 the Act was brought under full Canadian control through the Patriation of the Constitution, and was renamed the Constitution Act, 1867. Since Patriation the Act can only be amended in Canada, under the amending formula set out in the Constitution Act, 1982.

== Text of section 146 ==
Section 146 reads:

Power to admit Newfoundland, &c. into the Union
146 It shall be lawful for the Queen, by and with the Advice of Her Majesty's Most Honourable Privy Council, on Addresses from the Houses of the Parliament of Canada, and from the Houses of the respective Legislatures of the Colonies or Provinces of Newfoundland, Prince Edward Island, and British Columbia, to admit those Colonies or Provinces, or any of them, into the Union, and on Address from the Houses of the Parliament of Canada to admit Rupert's Land and the North-western Territory, or either of them, into the Union, on such Terms and Conditions in each Case as are in the Addresses expressed and as the Queen thinks fit to approve, subject to the Provisions of this Act; and the Provisions of any Order in Council in that Behalf shall have effect as if they had been enacted by the Parliament of the United Kingdom of Great Britain and Ireland.

Section 146 is found in Part XI of the Constitution Act, 1867, dealing with the admission of other colonies. It has not been amended since the Act was enacted in 1867.

== Purpose and interpretation ==
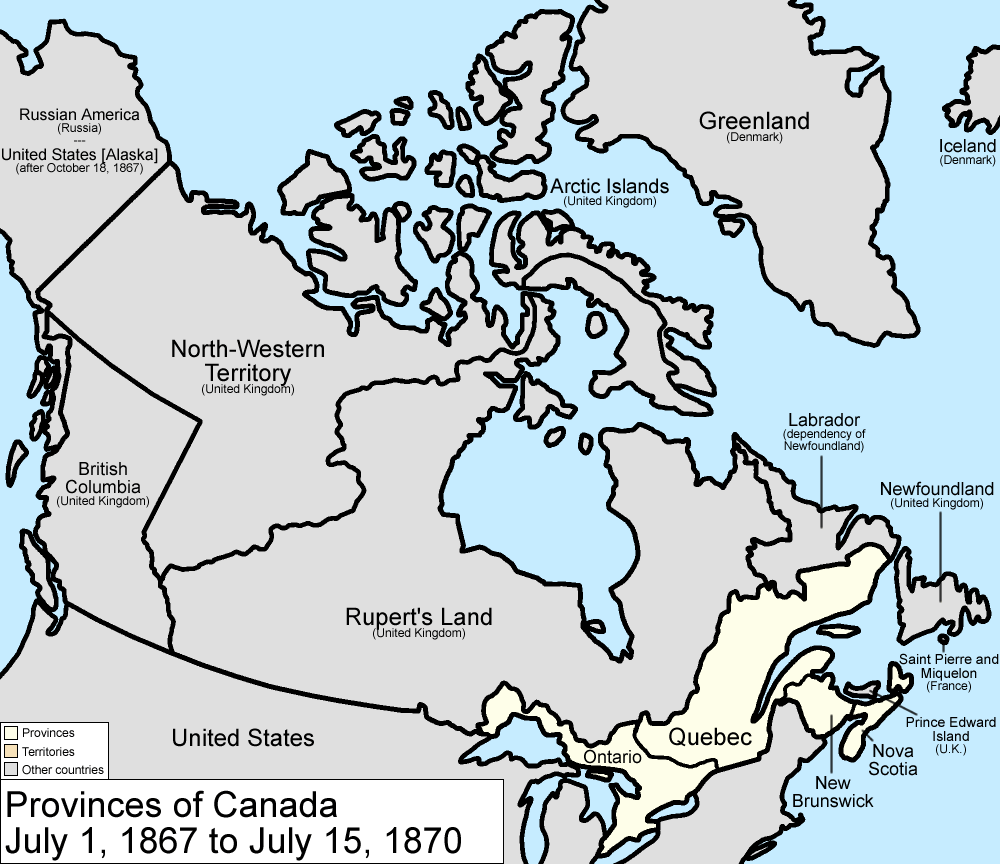
British North America at Confederation

The primary goal of Confederation in 1867 was to join the Province of Canada with the Maritime provinces of New Brunswick and Nova Scotia in a new federation. There had also been attempts to include Prince Edward Island and Newfoundland in Confederation, but at the time the Constitution Act, 1867 was drafted and passed, those attempts had not been successful.

Prince Edward Island had participated in the first two conferences on Confederation in 1864, the Charlottetown Conference and the Quebec Conference, but ultimately rejected Confederation following a change in government in 1865. Newfoundland had sent delegates to the Quebec Conference, but also rejected Confederation, after a provincial election in 1866. In December 1866, the delegates from the Province of Canada, New Brunswick and Nova Scotia met for a final conference, at the London Conference. Even at that late stage, there had been unsuccessful discussions in London with Premier J. C. Pope of Prince Edward Island about possible terms that could persuade the Island to join Confederation. The delegates to the London Conference wanted to provide for the eventual inclusion of Prince Edward Island and Newfoundland, in case the political situation changed.

Although the focus of Confederation was on the eastern British North American colonies, the delegates to the Quebec Conference also adopted a broader view of the potential for the new country, with the possibility of expansion all the way to the Pacific. They wanted to provide for a way to include the British possessions of Rupert's Land and the North-Western Territory, and also the colony of British Columbia.

Section 146 responded to all of these possibilities by setting out a procedure for other colonies to agree to join Confederation. Prince Edward Island, Newfoundland, and British Columbia all had local governments created by the British government. Section 146 provided that those provinces could join Canada if first approved by joint resolutions of the federal government and the provincial government, which then would be implemented by an order in council passed by the British government.

The situation in Rupert's Land and the North-Western Territory was different. Those areas were under the control of the Hudson's Bay Company, and lacked local governments created by the British government. Instead, there was the Council of Assiniboia, created by the Hudson's Bay Company. The Council had local representation, but was subject to the Company's authority. Section 146 did not create any requirement for local consent to joining Canada, unlike Prince Edward Island, Newfoundland and British Columbia. Instead, the British government could add those territories to Canada by an order in council, when requested by the government of Canada alone.

In 1868, the government of Canada began extensive negotiations with the Hudson's Bay Company, under the auspices of the British government, to determine the terms on which the Company would surrender all its claims under its Royal Charter of 1670. Canada and the Company eventually came to an agreement. In November 1869, the Company issued a deed of surrender, giving up its charter to the British government. In return, Canada agreed to make extensive land grants to the Company, and a payment of £300,000. The British government would then transfer Rupert's Land and the North-Western Territory to Canada. However, the government of Canada did not conduct any negotiations with the people of the Red River Colony, located in Rupert's Land. The Red River inhabitants opposed the transfer, resulting in the Red River Rebellion and the eventual creation of the province of Manitoba.

The Dominion of Newfoundland eventually joined Canada, in 1949. During the Great Depression, Newfoundland essentially went bankrupt. In exchange for British financial support, the Government of Newfoundland surrendered its right of self-government to the British Government, which created an unelected, appointed commission of government to govern Newfoundland. That arrangement lasted until after World War II, when the issue of Newfoundland's future was raised. In 1949, the people of Newfoundland voted to join Canada in a referendum. The British government implemented that decision by a British statute, the British North America Act, 1949, rather than by an order in council. The 1949 Act was subsequently renamed the Newfoundland Act in 1982.

== Related provisions ==
Section 147 of the Act provides for the representation of Newfoundland and Prince Edward Island in the Senate of Canada, in the event either of those colonies joined Confederation.

In 1870, the British government admitted Rupert's Land and the North-Western Territory to Confederation, by means of an order in council passed under this section.

In 1871, British Columbia joined Confederation, by means of an order in council passed by the British government under this section. The order in council set out the British Columbia Terms of Union which governed British Columbia's entry into Confederation.

In 1873, Prince Edward Island joined Confederation, by means of an order in council passed by the British government under this section. The order in council set out the Prince Edward Island Terms of Union which governed Prince Edward Island's entry into Confederation.

In 1949, the British Parliament passed the British North America Act, 1949 (renamed the Newfoundland Act in 1982) to implement the Terms of Union for Newfoundland to join Canada.
