= Section 21 of the Constitution Act, 1867 =

Provision of the Constitution of Canada

British North America Act, 1867

Section 21 of the Constitution Act, 1867 (French: article 21 de la Loi constitutionnelle de 1867) is a provision of the Constitution of Canada relating to the composition of the Senate of Canada, the upper house of the federal Parliament of Canada. The section provides that the total number of senators is 105. Section 21 originally provided that the Senate would be composed of 72 senators, but that number has gradually increased as new provinces and territories joined Confederation.

The Constitution Act, 1867 is the constitutional statute which established Canada. Originally named the British North America Act, 1867, the Act continues to be the foundational statute for the Constitution of Canada, although it has been amended many times since 1867. It is now recognised as part of the supreme law of Canada.

== Constitution Act, 1867 ==
The Constitution Act, 1867 is part of the Constitution of Canada and thus part of the supreme law of Canada. The Act sets out the constitutional framework of Canada, including the structure of the federal government and the powers of the federal government and the provinces. It was the product of extensive negotiations between the provinces of British North America at the Charlottetown Conference in 1864, the Quebec Conference in 1864, and the London Conference in 1866. Those conferences were followed by consultations with the British government in 1867. The Act was then enacted in 1867 by the British Parliament under the name the British North America Act, 1867. In 1982 the Act was brought under full Canadian control through the Patriation of the Constitution, and was renamed the Constitution Act, 1867. Since Patriation the Act can only be amended in Canada, under the amending formula set out in the Constitution Act, 1982.

== Text of section 21 ==
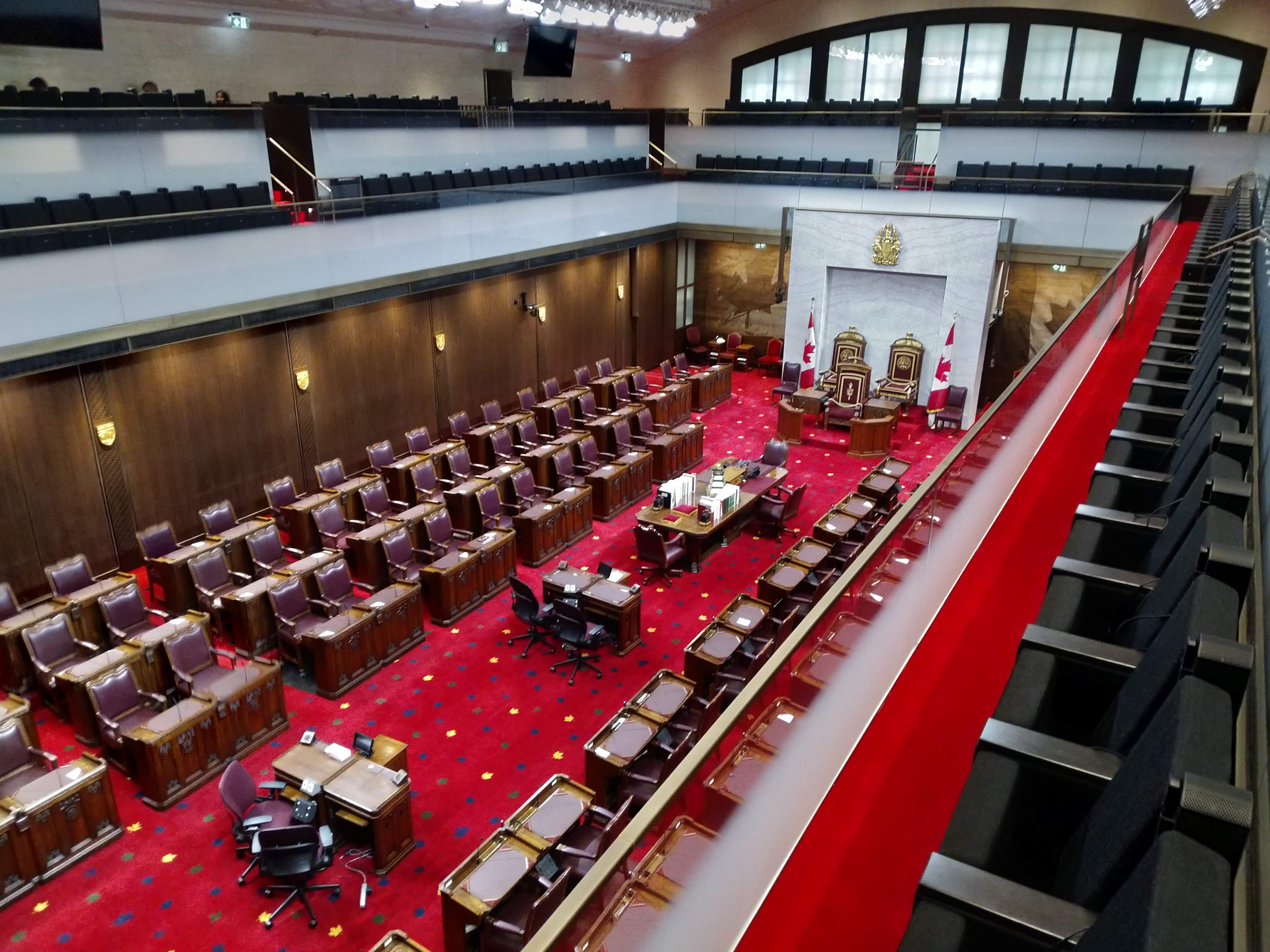
The Senate chamber

Section 21 reads:

Number of Senators
21 The Senate shall, subject to the Provisions of this Act, consist of One Hundred and Five Members, who shall be styled Senators.

Section 21 is found in Part IV of the Constitution Act, 1867, dealing with the legislative powers of the federal Parliament. It has been amended by implication several times since 1867. The wording of section 21 was not formally amended by those additions, but the amendments have been consolidated to the present number by the federal Department of Justice in the online version of the Constitution Act, 1867. (Note: This practice of consolidating implied amendments was implemented in 1956 by Elmer Driedger, QC, Assistant Deputy Minister of Justice and Parliamentary Counsel, in: A Consolidation of The British North America Acts, 1867 to 1952, (Ottawa: Queen's Printer, 1956), p. iii.)

== Legislative history ==
=== Original version ===
As originally enacted in 1867, section 21 read as follows:

Number of Senators
21 The Senate shall, subject to the Provisions of this Act, consist of Seventy-two Members, who shall be styled Senators.

Neither the Quebec Resolutions nor the London Resolutions had a provision equivalent to this wording of section 21. Instead, Resolutions 7 and 8 of the Quebec Resolutions provided the allocation of the seats for each of the provinces in the Senate (referred to in the resolutions as the Legislative Council), but without the total number of senators. Resolutions 7 and 8 of the London Resolutions did the same.

After finalising the London Resolutions in December 1866, the conference appointed a sub-committee, composed of the four provincial attorneys general, to prepare a rough draft of the bill. (Note: The four attorneys general were John A. Macdonald, Canada West; George-Étienne Cartier, Canada East; William Alexander Henry, Nova Scotia; and Charles Fisher, New Brunswick.) They followed the same approach as the resolutions, listing the number of senators for each province, but included the total number of senators.

However, the initial draft by the British parliamentary drafter removed the total number and simply gave the allocation of seats to each province. That wording was carried forward in the next two drafts, until the final draft in early February, which gave the total number of senators in clause 21, and the allocation of senators to each province in clause 22.

=== Subsequent amendments ===
Section 21 has been amended by implication several times since 1867. Each time a new province was added, the Senate was expanded, and eventually the federal territories also acquired Senate representation. Those amendments have not been formally amended the wording of section 21. Instead, the federal Department of Justice has updated section 21 in its consolidation of the Constitution Act, 1867, showing the total number of senators as 105.

== Purpose and interpretation ==
Section 21 sets out the basic number of senators. However, section 26 of the Act allows the appointment of an additional four or eight senators, in which case the absolute maximum number of senators is 113. No further appointments to a senate division can occur until the number of senators for that division has reverted to the normal number for that division, as senators retire. That process gradually restores the maximum number of senators to 105, as set out in section 21.

== Related provisions of the Constitution Act, 1867 ==
Section 22 of the Act allocates the Senate seats to the provinces and territories, primarily to the four Senate divisions of the Maritimes, Quebec, Ontario, and the West.

Section 26 of the Act provides for the appointment of additional senators, in exceptional cases.

Section 27 of the Act provides that if additional senators have been appointed, no further appointments to a Senate division can be made until the number of senators from that division is back to the normal number.

Section 28 of the Act provides that at no time will the number of senators exceed 113.
