= YNP =

YNP may refer to:

- Yosemite National Park, a national park in California, United States
- Yellowstone National Park, a national park in western United States
- Yanchep National Park, a national park in Western Australia
- Yoho National Park, a national park in British Columbia, Canada
- Yangmingshan National Park, a park in Taipei and New Taipei City, Taiwan
- Yukon Nominee Program, an immigration scheme in Yukon, Canada
- Natuashish Airport (IATA code YNP), an airport in Natuashish, Newfoundland and Labrador, Canada.
