= Immigration to Canada =

Migration origin

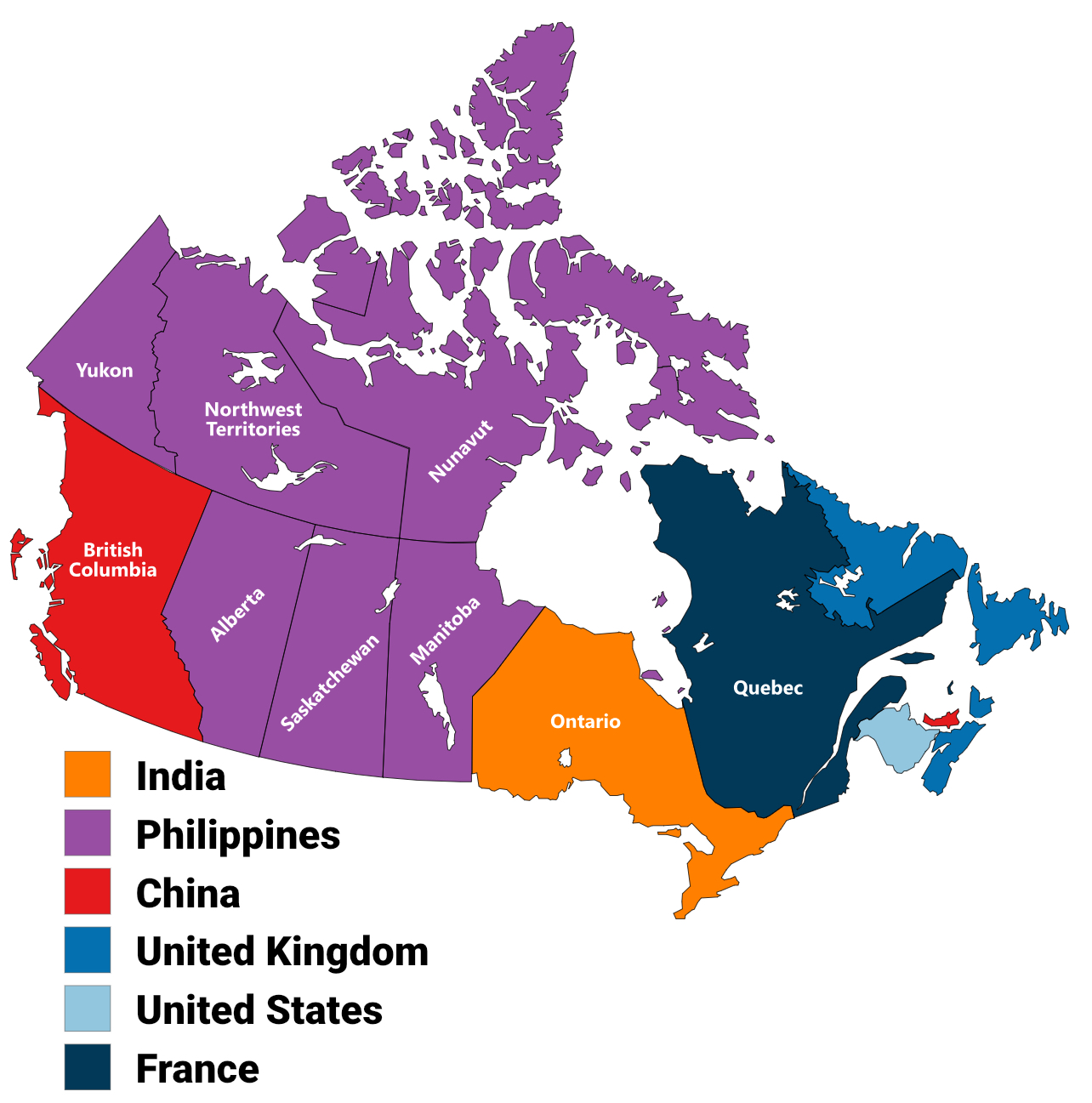
Largest nation of immigrants across Canadian provinces and territories (2021)

According to the 2021 Canadian census, immigrants in Canada number 8.3 million persons and make up approximately 23 percent of Canada's total population. This represents the eighth-largest immigrant population in the world, while the proportion represents one of the highest ratios for industrialized Western countries.

Following Canada's confederation in 1867, immigration played an integral role in helping develop vast tracts of land. During this era, the Canadian Government would sponsor information campaigns and recruiters to encourage settlement in rural areas; however, this would primarily be only towards those of European and religious Christian backgrounds, while others – "Buddhist, Shinto, Sikh, Muslim, and Jewish immigrants in particular" as well as the poor, ill, and disabled – would be less than welcome. Examples of this exclusion include the 1885 Chinese Immigration Act, the 1908 continuous journey regulation and ensuing 1914 Komagata Maru incident, and the 1940s internment of Japanese Canadians. Following 1947, in the post–World War II period, Canadian domestic immigration law and policy went through significant changes, most notably with the Immigration Act, 1976, and the current Immigration and Refugee Protection Act from 2002.

The main driver of Canadian population growth is immigration, driven mainly by economic policy and also family reunification. A record number of 405,000 immigrants were admitted to Canada in 2021, with plans to increase the annual intake of immigrants to 500,000 per year. New immigrants settle mostly in major urban areas in the country, such as Toronto, Montreal and Vancouver. Canada also accepts large numbers of refugees, accounting for over 10 percent of annual global refugee resettlements; it resettled more than 28,000 in 2018 and has spent $769 million in 2023 alone for free housing and meals.

== Statistics and sources of immigration ==
Canada receives its immigrant population from almost 200 countries. Statistics Canada projects that immigrants will represent between 29.1% and 34.0% of Canada's population in 2041, compared with 23.0% in 2021, while the Canadian population with at least one foreign born parent (first and second generation persons) could rise to between 49.8% and 54.3%, up from 44.0% in 2021. The number of people in the category "visible minorities" is by 2041 projected to double, making up the majority of the population of cities in Canada.

== Economic impact of immigration ==
Economic impact of Immigration on Canada is a divisive topic, with two main competing positions. Rhetoric on the right emphasizes “otherness” and “threat”, while parties on the left stress tolerance. On the left is the governing Liberal Party under Justin Trudeau (2015 to 2025) and Mark Carney (since 2025). Its position is based on the prediction that higher immigration rates will increase the size of the economy (GDP). The government in 2024 announced the optimal numbers would be 395,000 immigrants in 2025, 380,000 in 2026, and 365,000 in 2027. The Trudeau government stressed the need for controlled flows to allow adequate growth of healthcare, housing, and social services.

=== Conservative arguments for negative economic impact ===
The minority right-wing alternative has been associated with the Conservative Party and it leader Pierre Poilievre. It argues that immigration decreases living standards (GDP per capita) for the resident population. According to a 2011 report by the conservative Fraser Institute, immigrants to Canada cost the federal government up to $23 billion annually and was found to be a large fiscal burden on Canadian taxpayers. Many sources consider the reason for Canada's mass immigration is because of "dependency ratio," in Canada this ratio in total is rising hence the government wants mass immigration to increase the taxpayer base for Canada to be a total welfare state. Many consider this as a low-wage-low-productivity model of immigration that does not focus on creating wealth, and as a failed approach due to not having systems and settings in place for smoothly transitioning new immigrants into jobs in skill shortage sectors that they were invited to fill, and that can empower them for being highly productive and contributing citizens, and top rate tax payers. Among other factors, a major systemic impediment to this transition is the prevalent socioeconomic racialization of immigrants and its life-course altering impact on their quality of life. A popular narrative that exists for immigration is that mass immigration can provide a solution to an aging population. This narrative has been questioned by some and they state immigration alone "can do little" in addressing the issue. Many critics consider Canada has to systematically re-focus on legislating and promoting pro-family policies, and have to work actively in raising the living standard of Canadians. In 2023, Statistics Canada released a report indicating that the longstanding concern regarding labor shortages has ceased to be a predicament, a major objective of the immigration policy. The report recommends accommodating workers at all levels for employment by easing unnecessary hiring requirements, prioritizing on-the-job training, and establishing sustainable workplace practices. Economists at banking institutions assert that the implications of rapid population growth for Canada are unmistakably disruptive. They contend that the labor market cannot feasibly accommodate the continued influx of newcomers. This expansion of the labor force lacks prudent planning and increases the risk of unemployment, posing a significant threat to the national economy. Critics of mass immigration state that Canada does not have the infrastructure and public services to accommodate immigrants and temporary residents in large numbers. Added to this they observe Canada's moral responsibility (Duty of care) to the welcomed refugees is as bad as its responsibility to the bulging homelessness issue.

== History of immigration ==
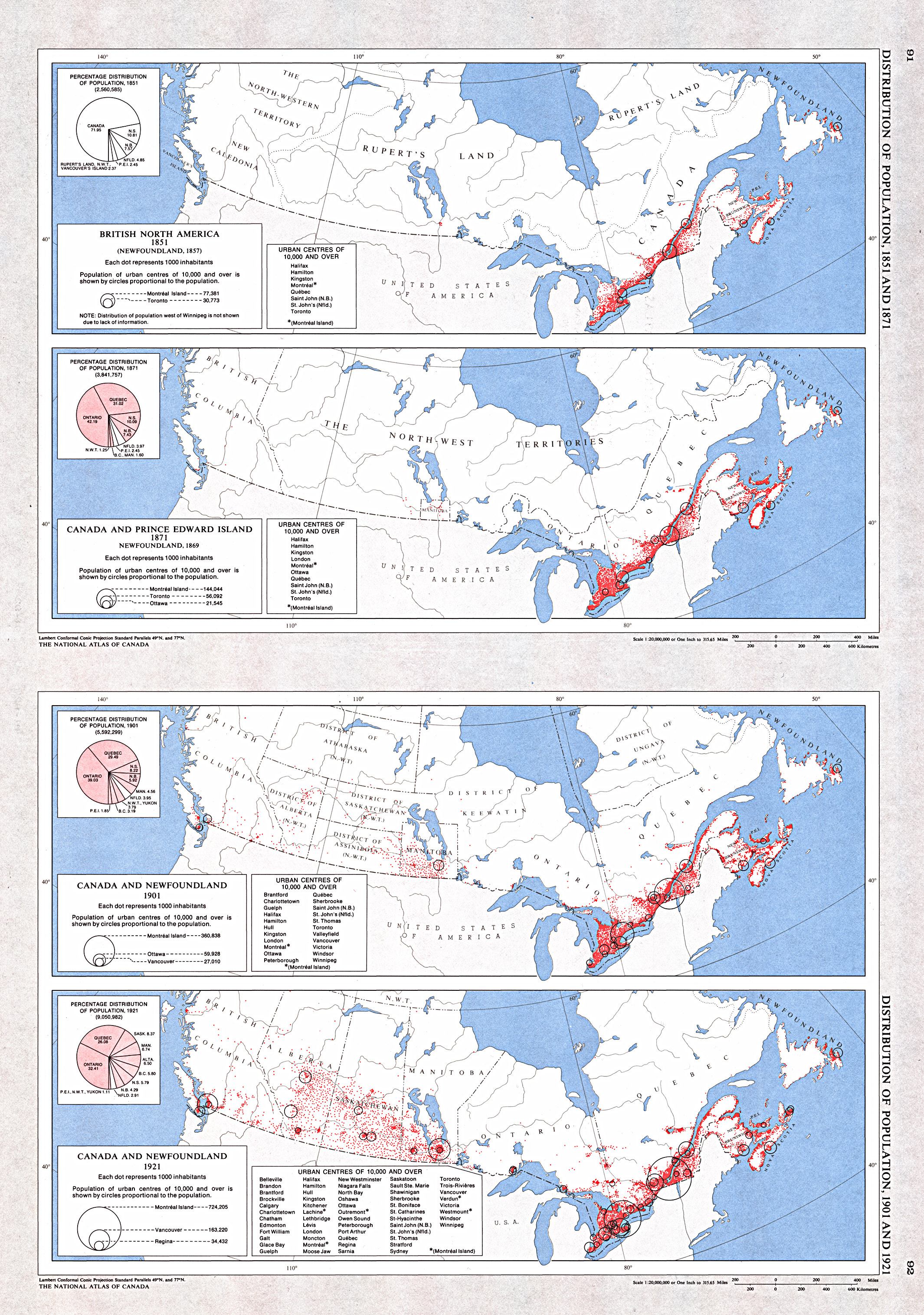
A collection of four maps showing the distribution of the Canadian population for 1851 (Newfoundland 1857), 1871 (Newfoundland 1869), 1901 and 1921 by historical region.

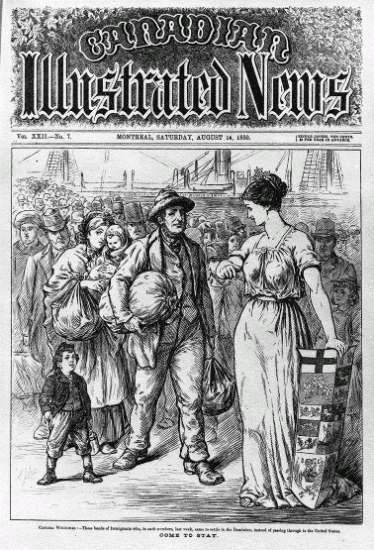
Come to Stay, printed in 1880 in the Canadian Illustrated News, which refers to immigration to the "Dominion".

Following initial British and French colonization, what is now Canada has seen four major waves (or peaks) of immigration and settlement of non-Aboriginal Peoples take place over a span of nearly two centuries. Canada is currently undergoing its fifth wave.

Periods of low immigration in Canada have also occurred: international movement was very difficult during the world wars, and there was a lack of jobs "pulling" workers to Canada during the Great Depression in Canada. Statistics Canada has tabulated the effect of immigration on population growth in Canada from 1851 to 2001.

=== First wave, pre-1815 ===
The first significant wave of non-Aboriginal immigration to Canada occurred over almost two centuries with slow, but progressive, French settlement in Quebec and Acadia, along with smaller numbers of American and European entrepreneurs in addition to British military personnel. This wave culminated with the influx of 46–50,000 British Loyalists fleeing the American Revolution, chiefly from the Mid-Atlantic States, mostly into what are now Southern Ontario, the Eastern Townships of Quebec, New Brunswick, and Nova Scotia. 36,000 of these migrants went to the Maritimes, and some would later make their way to Ontario.

Another wave of 30,000 Americans settled in Ontario and the Eastern Townships between the late 1780s and 1812 with promises of land. From forcibly having cleared land in Scotland, several thousands of Gaelic-speaking Scottish Highlanders migrated to Cape Breton, Nova Scotia and parts of Eastern Ontario during this period, marking a new age for Canada and its people.

=== Second wave (The Great Migration), 1815–1850 ===
The second wave of immigrants, known as the Great Migration of Canada, saw the arrival of at least 800,000 people between 1815 and 1850, 60% of whom were British (English and Scottish), while the remainder was mostly Irish.

The Great Migration encouraged immigrants to settle in Canada after the War of 1812, including British army regulars who had served in that war. In 1815, 80% of the 250,000 English-speaking people in Canada were either American colonists or their descendants. Worried about another American attempt at invasion—and to counter the French-speaking influence of Quebec—colonial governors of Canada rushed to promote settlement in backcountry areas along newly constructed plank roads within organized land tracts, mostly in Upper Canada (present-day Ontario). Much of the settlements were organized by large companies to promote clearing, and thus farming of land lots. By 1851, the percentage of Americans had dropped to 30% or 500k. By the 1820s Irish immigration to Canada had increased in small numbers to organize land settlements, mostly to work on canals, timber, railroads but also established themselves in the cities in the Maritimes, Québec, and Ontario. Irish immigration would peak from 1846 to 1849 due to the Great Famine of Ireland, which resulted in hundreds of thousands more Irish migrants arriving on Canada's shores, with a portion migrating to the United States, either in the short-term or over the subsequent decades.

This movement of people boosted Canada's population from approximately 500,000 in 1812 to 2.5 million by 1851. The Francophones were 300,000 of the population in 1812, increasing to approx. 700,000 by the 1851 census, however, demographically Canada had swung to a majority Anglophone country. Canada's 1851 population by region would look as follows:

- Upper Canada (Ontario): 952,000;
- Lower Canada (Quebec): 890,000—about a quarter of whom spoke English as a first language;
- The Maritimes: 550,000.

==== Canada-US ====
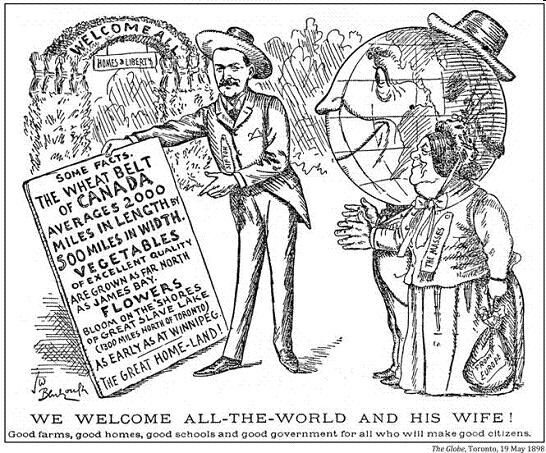
The government promoted cheap wheat lands in the Prairies. 1898

The Dominion Lands Act of 1872 copied the American system by offering ownership of 160 acres (65 ha) of land free (with a small registration fee) to any man over the age of 18, or any woman heading a household. They did not need to be citizens but had to live on the plot and improve it.

Also during this period, Canada became a port of entry for many Europeans seeking to gain entry into the United States. Canadian transportation companies advertised Canadian ports as a hassle-free way to enter the US, especially as the States began barring entry to certain ethnicities. Both the US and Canada mitigated this situation in 1894 with the Canadian Agreement which allowed for U.S. immigration officials to inspect ships landing at Canadian ports for immigrants excluded from the US. If found, the transporting companies were responsible for shipping the persons back.

View chart definition.
Annual immigration to Canada 1890–1920

Clifford Sifton, Ottawa's Minister of the Interior (1896–1905), argued that the free western lands were ideal for growing wheat and would attract large numbers of hard-working farmers. He removed obstacles that included control of the lands by companies or organizations that did little to encourage settlement. Land companies, the Hudson's Bay Company, and school lands all accounted for large tracts of excellent property. The railways kept closed even larger tracts because they were reluctant to take legal title to the even-numbered lands they were due, thus blocking the sale of odd-numbered tracts. With the goal of maximizing immigration from Britain, eastern Canada and the US, Sifton broke the legal log jam, and set up aggressive advertising campaigns in the U.S. and Europe, with a host of agents promoting the Canadian West. He would also broker deals with ethnic groups who wanted large tracts for homogeneous settlement. Attempts to form permanent settlement colonies west of the Great Lakes were beset by difficulty and isolation until the building of the Canadian Pacific Railway and the second of the two Riel Rebellions. Despite the railway making the region more accessible, there were fears that a tide of settlers from the United States might overrun the British territory.

=== Third wave, 1890–1920 ===
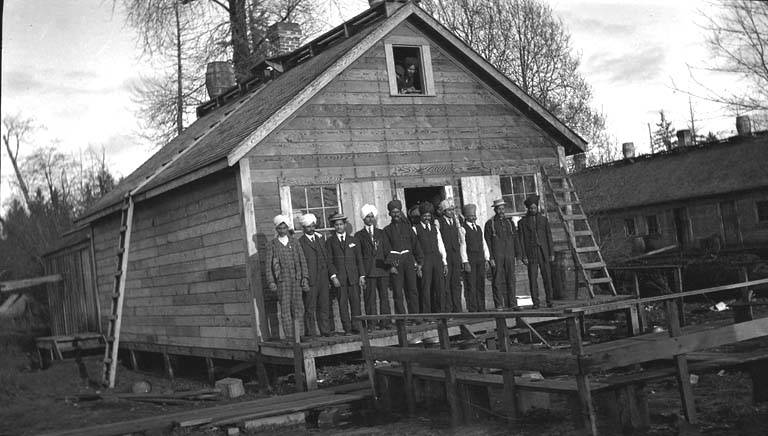
Punjabi Sikh settlers at a lumber camp in British Columbia, circa 1914

In 1896, Interior Minister Clifford Sifton launched a program of settlement with offices and advertising in the United Kingdom and continental Europe, leading to Canada's third wave of immigration. This wave peaked before World War I from 1911 to 1913, with over 400,000 migrants in 1912—many of whom were from Eastern and Southern Europe; primarily railway-based, the immigration wave created farms, towns, and cities across the Prairie Provinces.

==== Chinese immigration ====
Prior to 1885, restrictions on immigration were imposed mostly in response to large waves of migrants rather than planned policy decisions. Such restrictions, at least as official policy, would not explicitly target any specific group or ethnicity of people until 1885, with the passing of the first Chinese Head Tax legislation by the MacDonald government in response to a growing number of Chinese migrants working on the Canadian Pacific Railway.

Subsequent increases in the head tax in 1900 and 1903 limited Chinese entrants to Canada, and it was followed by 1907 major riots against 'Oriental' people (i.e. Asians) in Vancouver, BC by Asiatic Exclusion League. In 1923, the government passed the Chinese Immigration Act which excluded Chinese people from entering Canada altogether between 1923 and 1947. In recognizing Canada's historical discrimination against Chinese immigrants, an official government apology and compensations were announced on 22 June 2006.

=== Fourth wave, 1940s–1960s ===
View chart definition.
Annual immigration to Canada 1940–1969

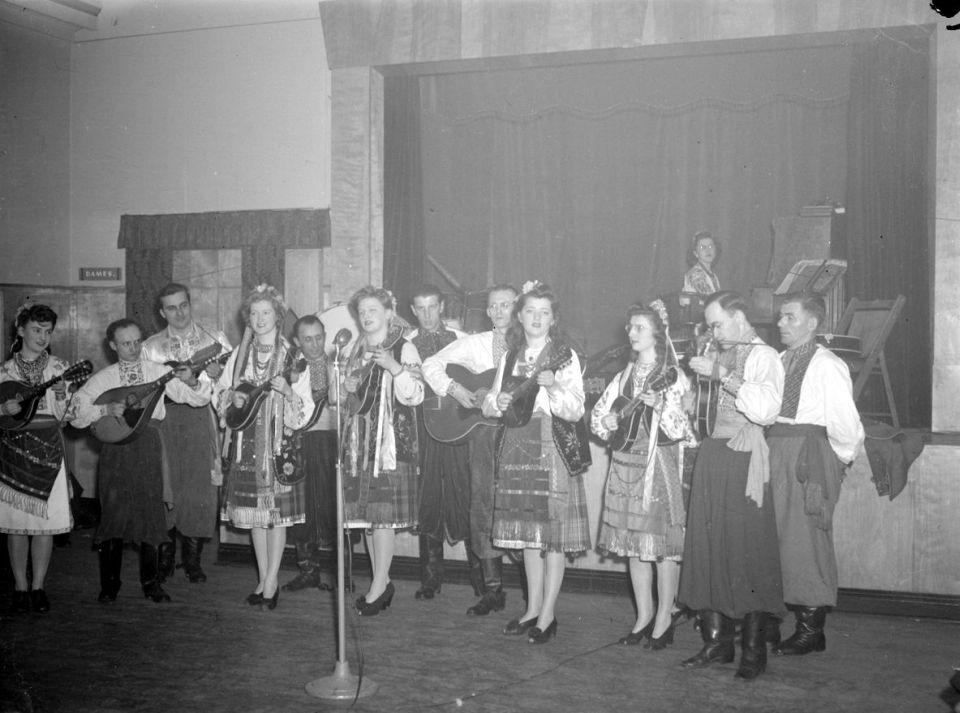
Ukrainian Mandolin Orchestra in May 1945

The fourth wave came from Europe following World War II, and peaked at 282,000 in 1957. With many of these migrants coming from Italy and Portugal, Pier 21 in Halifax, Nova Scotia proved to be an influential port for European immigration. From 1928 until ceasing operations in 1971, the Pier would receive 471,940 Italians, becoming the third-largest ethnic group to immigrate to Canada during that time period.

Immigrants from Britain, however, were still given the highest priority, and 'Canadianization' would become of great importance for new arrivals who lacked a British cultural background. There would be no such effort to attract Francophone immigrants. In regard to economic opportunity, Canada was most attractive to farmers headed to the Prairies, who typically came from Eastern and Central Europe, as immigrants from Britain preferred urban life. As such, the Church of England took up the role of introducing British values to farmers newly arrived in the Prairie provinces, although, in practice, they clung to their traditional religious affiliations. Nonetheless, around the 1960s, Indo-Canadians would establish themselves in Canada's exurban and rural agriculture and become a dominant feature in British Columbia's farming sector, having already primarily been established in the provincial forestry industry since the turn of the 20th century. Hispanic immigrants would follow similar lines, particularly in regions that were linked with strong farming settlements immediately south of the border.

Historically, Canadian immigration policy openly favored immigrants of Caucasian ancestry from the United States, Britain, and Europe. The Liberal government of the 1960s was responsible for dismantling this racially biased system. With the economy still expanding, Canadians did not always demonstrate sufficient mobility to fill the hiring needs of some regions, nor to fill some economic niches (particularly "entry-level jobs"). Due to these circumstances, in 1967, the Canadian Government would introduce a points-based system, under which applicants were given preference if they knew either French, English, or both; were non-dependent adults (i.e., not too old to work); already had prospective employment lined up in Canada; had relatives in the country (who could support them if necessary); were interested in settling in the parts of Canada with the greatest need for workers; and were trained or educated in fields that were in demand. The new legislation would prove to be an integral element in attracting large numbers of immigrants from sources that were considered "non-traditional."

From then on, Canada would start to become a more multi-ethnic country with substantial non-British or non-French European elements. Ukrainian Canadians, for instance, accounted for the largest Ukrainian population outside of the Soviet Union. Also in the 1960s, young American men fled to Canada in order to avoid the U.S. draft for the Vietnam War. Especially large numbers were established in BC's Kootenays, Gulf Islands, and Sunshine Coast, followed by others, including counterculture, back-to-the-land advocates who were more drawn to Canada.

== Contemporary immigration, 1970s–present ==
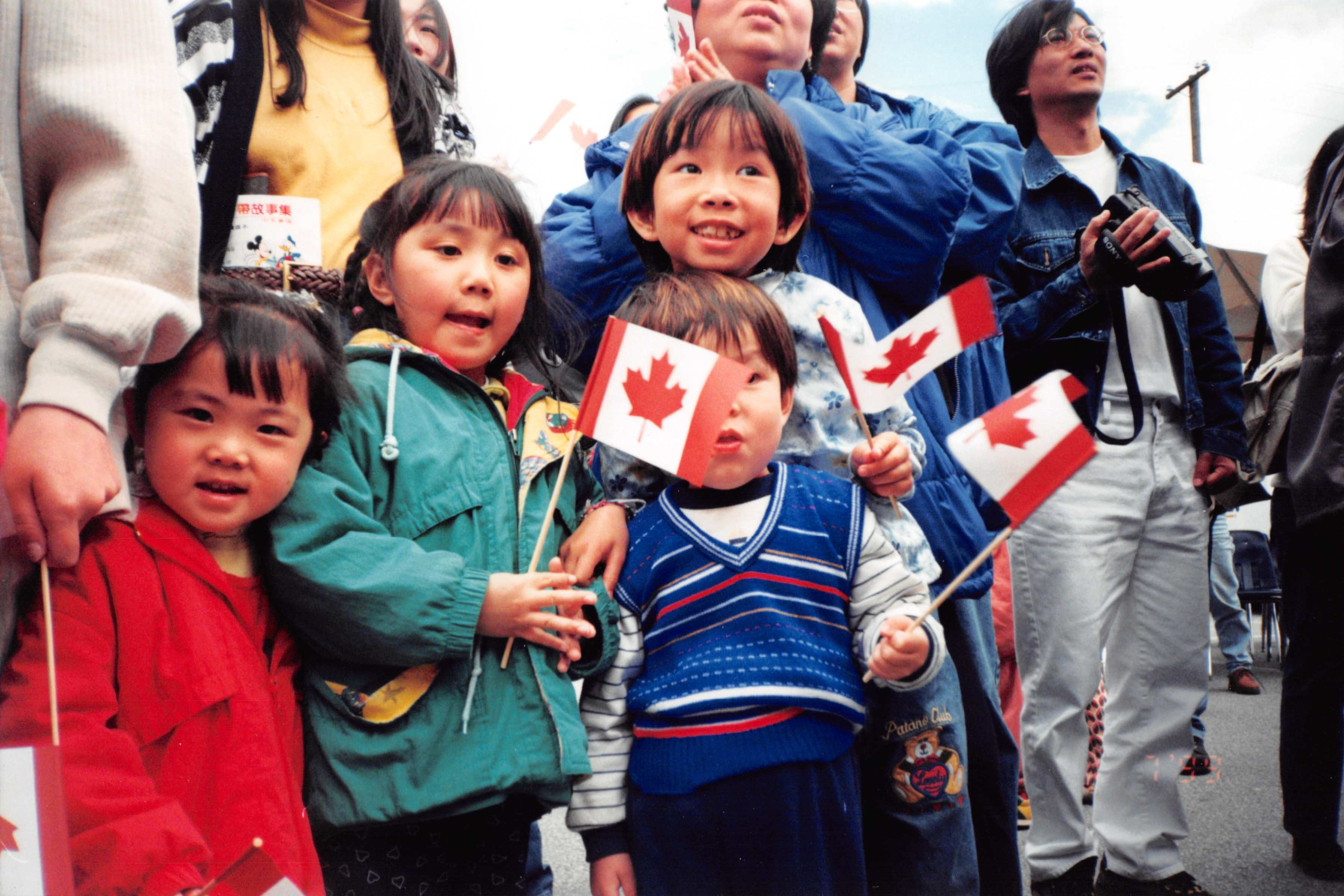
Fifth-wave Canadian children celebrating Canada Day in Vancouver, 1 July 1999

Immigration to Canada since the 1970s, or the fifth wave, has been mostly from Asia. This was largely influenced in 1976, when the Immigration Act was revised, and maintained as official government policy. The regulations introduced in 1976 consisted of 9 categories: education, occupation, professional skills, age, arranged employment, knowledge of English and/or French, relatives in Canada, and "personal characteristics." To qualify for immigration, 50 points out of 100 were necessary in 1976.

During Pierre Trudeau's time as prime minister, Canada's immigration levels were much lower and more stable, with total arrivals often in the tens of thousands annually, contrasting sharply with current figures. The period between 1968 and 1975 averaged over 165,000 newcomers annually, with a peak of 218,500 immigrants in 1974. Due to a weakening economy, the numbers declined, averaging around 114,000 newcomers from 1976 to 1984. The government introduced official immigration quotas in the mid-1970s, with a target of 100,000 in 1979.

On 20 February 1978, Canada and Quebec signed an immigration agreement allowing Quebec decision-making power in independently choosing its immigrants, who would then still have to be approved by Ottawa.

During the Mulroney administration, immigration levels were increased. Brian Mulroney's government significantly boosted Canada's annual immigration targets, moving them up from around 84,000 to over 250,000 by the early 1990s, a major policy shift focusing on economic class via the points system, reflecting a broader strategy to grow the population and labor force. From the late 1980s, the "fifth wave" of immigration has been maintained, with slight fluctuations (225,000–275,000 annually). In the early 1990s, as noted by The Globe and Mail, Canada's Reform Party "was branded 'racist' for suggesting that immigration levels be lowered from 250,000 to 150,000".

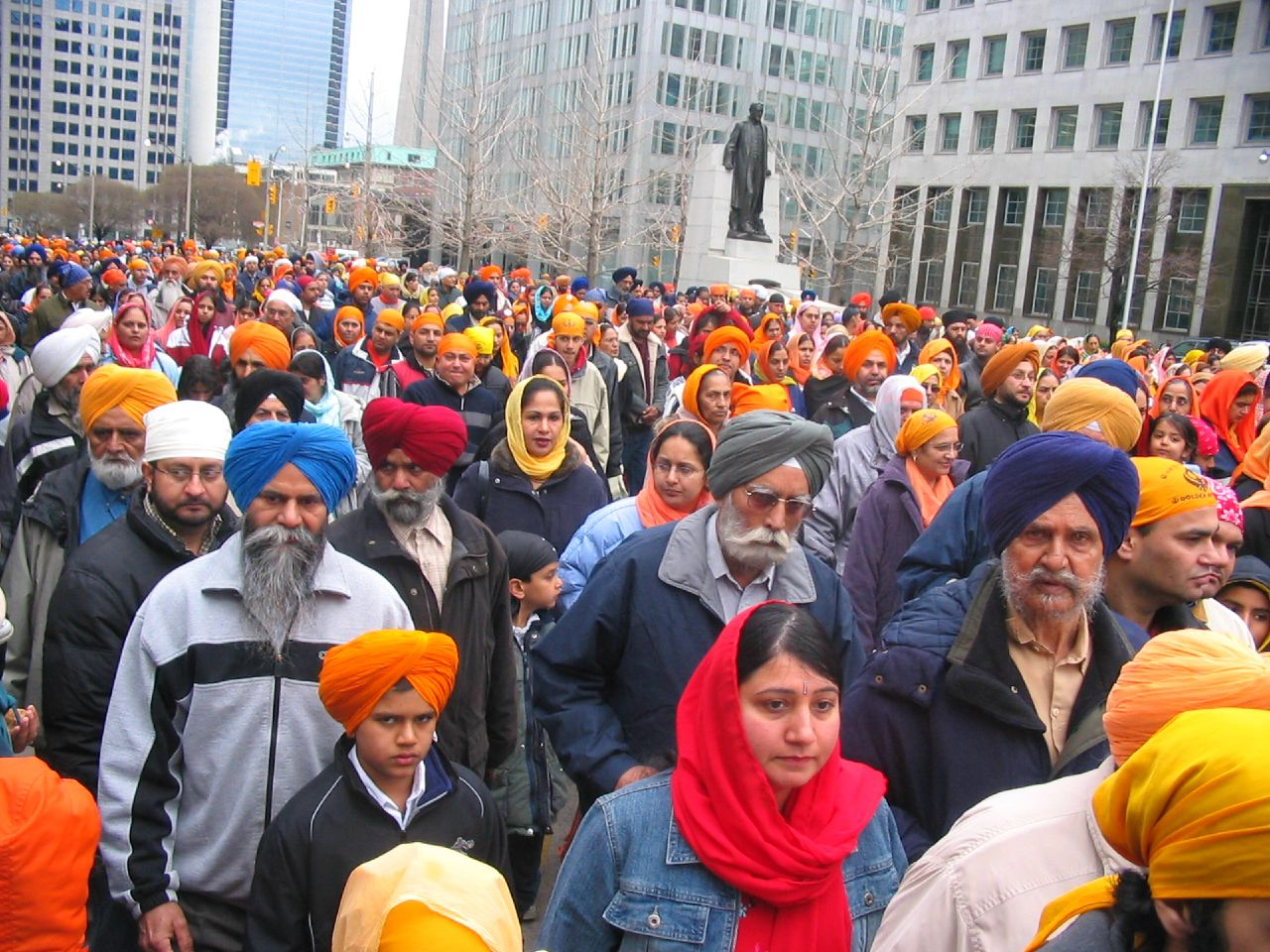
Sikhs celebrating the Sikh new year in Toronto

In 2008, Stephen Harper gave then-parliamentary secretary and Minister of Multiculturalism and Citizenship Jason Kenney a mandate to integrate immigrants while improving relationships between the government to communities to gain votes. In same year, Citizenship and Immigration Canada (now Immigration, Refugees and Citizenship Canada [IRCC]) made changes to immigration policy, such as reducing professional categories for skilled immigration and eliminating caps for immigrants in various categories. Likewise, in 2015, Canada introduced the "Express Entry" system, providing a streamlined application process for many economic immigrants.

In 2012, a moratorium was set on applications for the Skilled Worker Program and the Immigrant Investor Program due to a backlog of over 300,000 applications made before February 2008. The 300,000 applications in the backlog were cancelled, and new applications were reopened in 2013.

From 2013–2014, most of the Canadian public, as well as the country's major political parties, supported either sustaining or increasing the current level of immigration. A sociological study conducted in 2014 concluded that "Australia and Canada are the most receptive to immigration among western nations." In 2017, an Angus Reid poll indicated that a majority of respondents believed that Canada should accept fewer immigrants and refugees.

According to 2016 Canadian Census data from Statistics Canada, over one in five Canadians were born abroad, while 22.3% of the Canadian population were visible minorities, of whom three in ten were born in Canada. Moreover, 21.9% of the Canadian population reported themselves as being or having been a landed immigrant or permanent resident in Canada—close to the 1921 Census record of 22.3%, the highest level Canada has seen since Confederation in 1867. In November 2017, Minister of Immigration, Refugees and Citizenship Ahmed Hussen announced that Canada would admit nearly 1 million permanent residents over the following three years, rising from 0.7% to 1% of its population by 2020. This increase was motivated by the economic needs of the country caused by an aging population.

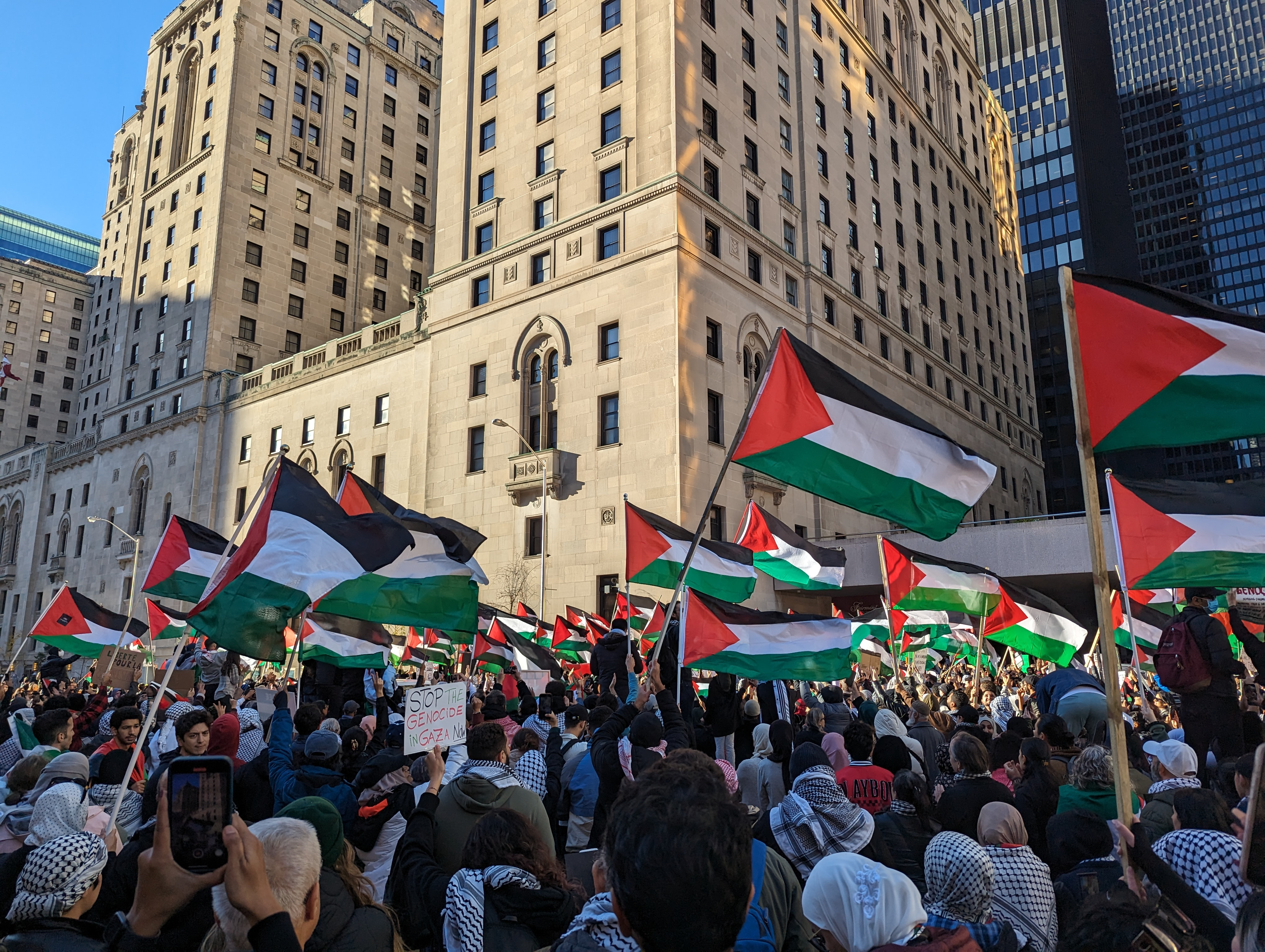
A majority of Muslims in Canada are of immigrant backgrounds, consisting of a diverse range of ethnic groups

In 2019, Canada admitted 341,180 permanent residents, compared to 321,055 the previous year. Among those admitted, 58% were economic immigrants and their accompanying immediate families; 27% were family class; 15% were either resettled refugees or protected persons or were in the humanitarian and other category. India, Philippines and China are the top three countries of origin for immigrants moving to Canada. A record number of 405,000 immigrants were admitted to Canada in 2021, surpassing the previous annual record of 400,900 set in 1913.

In 2022, the Government of Canada stated plans to increase immigration to 500,000 people per year by 2025. However, following issues regarding temporary residents of Canada, the number of permanent residents in 2025 decreased from a previous target of 500,000 to 395,000, and is to set a smaller target for by 2027.

As of January 2025, more than three million temporary residents were living in Canada, and an estimated 600,000 undocumented migrants were present in 2024. The 2025 federal budget stated that the Liberal government intended to reinstate the pandemic-period Temporary Resident to Permanent Resident (TR to PR) lower-threshold immigration pathway, which transitioned temporary foreign workers to permanent residents without regard for their competency or whether they were addressing genuine workforce shortages. Through this program, the government aimed to approve approximately 33,000 such transitions each year through 2027.

=== Immigration rate ===
Since the confederation in 1867, the highest annual immigration rate in Canada occurred during the early 20th century, including 1913 (new immigrants accounted for 5.3 percent of the total population), 1912 (5.1 percent), 1911 (4.6 percent), 1907 (4.3 percent), and 1910 (4.1 percent). At this time, immigration from the British Isles increased, supplemented by a rapid increase in immigration flows from continental Europe, especially Germany, Scandinavia, Austria-Hungary and the Russian Empire.

Per the 1991 Canada–Québec Accord relating to Immigration and Temporary Admission of Aliens, Quebec has sole responsibility for selecting most immigrants destined for the province. However, once immigrants are granted permanent residency or citizenship, they are free to move to and reside in any province under Section Six of the Canadian Charter of Rights and Freedoms.

In 2001, 250,640 people immigrated to Canada, relative to a total population of 30,007,094 people per the 2001 Census. Since 2001, immigration has ranged between 221,352 and 262,236 immigrants per annum. In 2017, the Liberal government announced Canada would welcome nearly one million immigrants over the next three years. The number of migrants would climb to 310,000 in 2018, up from 300,000 in 2017. That number was projected to rise to 330,000 in 2019 and then to 340,000 in 2020. Accordingly, between 2017 and 2018, net immigration accounted for 80% of Canada's population increase.

India is the largest source country for immigrants to Canada, particularly for permanent residents, temporary foreign workers, and international students. In 2023, Canada admitted 139,715 new permanent residents from India. In 2021, the Indo-Canadian population numbered approximately 1.86 million. Sikhism is the fourth-largest religion in Canada, with nearly 800,000 adherents, or 2.1% of Canada's population, as of 2021.

The three main official reasons given for the level of immigration were:

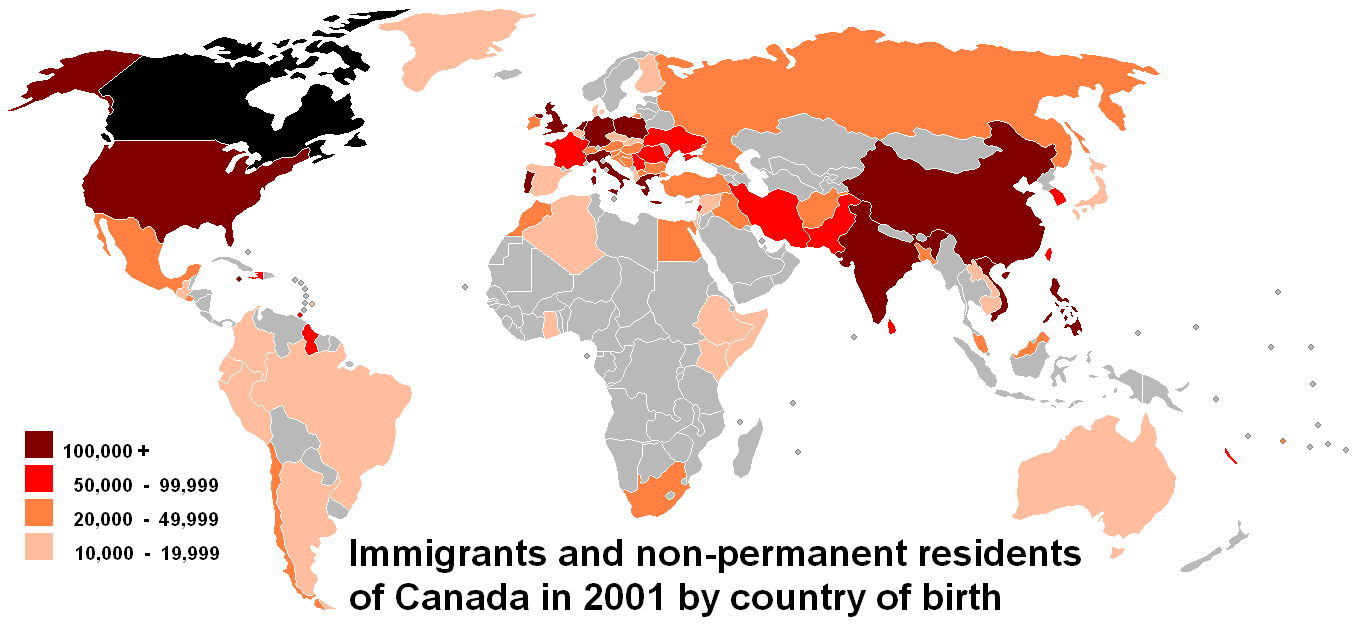
100,000+ / 50,000–99,999 / 20,000–49,999 / 10,000–19,999

- The social component – Canada facilitates family reunification.
- The humanitarian component – Relating to refugees.
- The economic component – Attracting immigrants who will contribute economically and fill labour market needs.

Canada's level of immigration peaked in 1993, the last year of the Progressive Conservative government, and was maintained by the Liberal Party of Canada. Ambitious targets of an annual 1% per capita immigration rate were hampered by financial constraints. The Liberals committed to raising actual immigration levels further in 2005.

As Canadian political parties have been cautious about criticizing high levels of immigration, immigration levels to Canada (approx. 0.7% per year) are considerably higher per capita than to the United States (approx. 0.3% per year).

Furthermore, much of the immigration to the US is from Latin America and relatively less from Asia, though admitting about twice as many immigrants from Asian countries (e.g., China, India, the Philippines, and Pakistan) as Canada. As such, the Hispanic/Latin American population is the largest minority group in the United States, whereas the Asian population is the largest minority group in Canada.

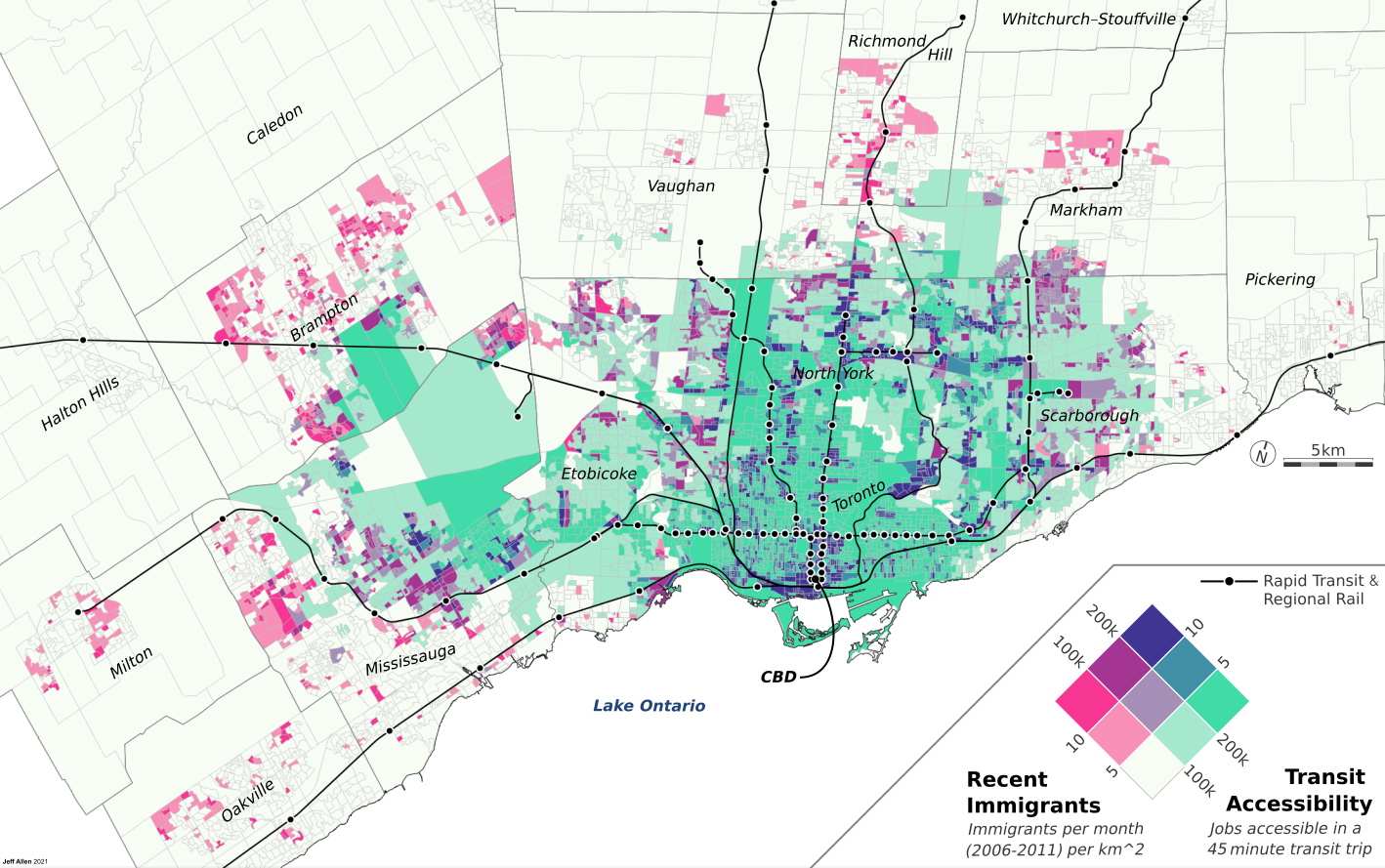
Immigrant settlement patterns and public transit in Toronto, 2016

Immigrant population growth is concentrated in or around large cities (particularly Vancouver, Toronto, and Montreal). These cities have experienced increased service demands accompanying strong population growth, raising concerns about the infrastructure's ability to handle influxes in such places. For example, as noted in a Toronto Star article from 14 July 2006, 43% of Canada's immigrants move to the Greater Toronto Area, and that, "unless Canada cuts immigrant numbers, our major cities will not be able to maintain their social and physical infrastructures." Most of the provinces that do not have one of those destination cities have implemented strategies to try to boost their share of immigration. Within cities, immigrants are more likely to settle in areas with better public transit service compared to non-immigrants, and are more likely to use public transit for travelling to work, partly because of costs and barriers to car ownership. While cities are a popular destination for new immigrants, some small towns have seen an influx of immigration due to economic reasons and accessibility of schools excelling in both academic and vocational training. This dynamic presents a challenge for these regional districts/municipalities to adapt and grow with the changes.

Canada's plan to increase immigration aims to address labor shortages and demographic changes that threaten the country's future. While experts acknowledge the benefits of increased immigration, they emphasize the need for comprehensive solutions that extend beyond simply raising immigration levels. Matching newcomers' skills with available job opportunities, mandating enhanced acceptance of recognized foreign credentials across regulatory bodies, and expanding the focus to encompass a wider range of job sectors are crucial steps. Additionally, they express concerns regarding the strain on essential services and the potential for stakeholder influence on policy-making, which requires careful consideration. The experts concur that achieving a balance between the country's economic needs and the well-being of both newcomers and existing residents will be key to effectively addressing labor market challenges and ensuring successful immigration integration.

=== Illegal migration ===
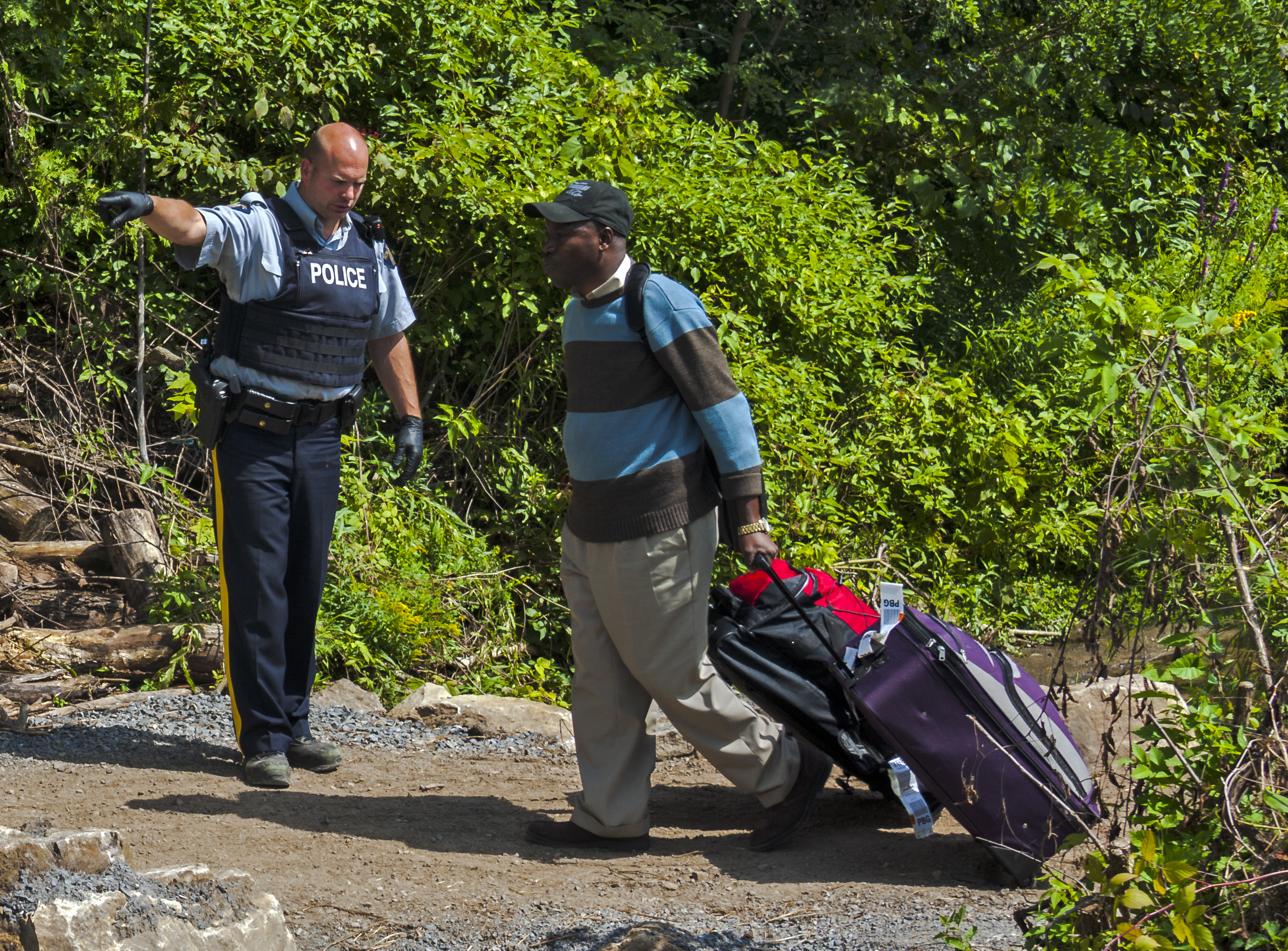
A Royal Canadian Mounted Police in the Quebec-New York border in Lacolle directs a man entering Canada outside of a port of entry to a nearby tent for processing.

Estimates of undocumented immigrant in Canada ranged between 35,000 and 120,000 in 2007, with 2024 estimates generally of 500,000 to 700,000. James Bissett, a former head of the Canadian Immigration Service, has suggested that the lack of any credible refugee screening process, combined with a high likelihood of ignoring any deportation orders, has resulted in tens of thousands of outstanding warrants for the arrest of rejected refugee claimants, with little attempt at enforcement. A 2008 report by the Auditor General Sheila Fraser stated that Canada has lost track of as many as 41,000 illegal immigrants.

In August 2017, the border between Quebec and New York, most notably the former Roxham Road port of entry, saw an influx of up to 500 crossings each day outside of official ports of entry by people seeking asylum in Canada. Entering Canada outside of a port of entry is not an offence under either the Criminal Code or Immigration and Refugee Protection Act, and regulations under the latter act require only that a person seeking to enter Canada outside a point of entry to "appear without delay" at the nearest port of entry. While entering Canada outside of a port of entry may represent an unlawful act, section 133 of the Immigration and Refugee Protection Act requires that charges related to any offences associated with entering Canada are stayed while an entrant's claim is being processed in accordance with the Convention Relating to the Status of Refugees.

As result, Canada increased border patrol and immigration staffing in the area, reiterating that crossing the border outside ports of entry (referred to as 'irregular migration') had no effect on one's asylum status. It is reported that over 38,000 'irregular migrants' arrived in Canada since early 2017.

For the same reason, both Ontario and Quebec requested that the Government of Canada provide CA$200 million or more to cover the cost of housing and providing services to asylum seekers. Related to asylum seekers, Canada joined 164 countries in signing the UN Global Compact for Migration in 2018. The 2017 government claims it is to follow careful measures and meet international obligations in accommodating irregular migrants.

While it is impossible to determine, it is generally accepted that there are tens of thousands of illegal immigrants living in Canada. There were 2,560 removal orders issued against illegal immigrants in 2018, according to a report by the Immigration and Refugee Board of Canada. An internal audit report surfaced in 2023 from the Canada Border Security Agency (CBSA) revealing that nearly half of the flagged foreign nationals with serious offences, including war crimes, espionage, and terrorism, were allowed to gain residency in Canada from 2014 to 2019. Immigration officials granted residency in 46% of the more than 7,000 cases where the CBSA recommended against entry. The audit evaluated the Immigration National Security Screening Program, which is responsible for preventing inadmissible individuals from entering or staying in the country.

=== Settlement workers ===
Settlement workers help immigrants to Canada understand their rights and responsibilities and find the programs and services they need to integrate into the new culture and pursue livelihood opportunities. They motivate organizations to hire immigrants and support immigration by recruiting new members/employees. They work with government agencies, school boards, libraries, and other community organizations that have networks of resources. These working relationships also help to provide families with the tools necessary to manage the changing identities of new immigrant families to Canada. Non-profit organizations such as Mennonite New Life Centre of Toronto were founded as early as 1983 to help with immigrant settlement.

=== Dual intent migration: International students ===
Canada is an educational haven for international students seeking a North American education. According to Project Atlas, Canada is the world's fourth most popular destination for international students. The government, by opening its doors to international students nationwide, has given the education sector an economic boost. In 2019 alone, it is estimated that $21 billion in revenue was generated from tuition. In a given year it is estimated that around 600,000 international students reside in the country as temporary residents.

In 2019, it was reported that there was a new trend of exploiting the Canadian visa process, in which immigrant consultants/lawyers with food franchises, motels, gas stations, and family-run businesses collect substantial cash from students and foreign nationals in exchange for supporting them through their permanent resident applications.

Also in 2019, many international students advocated for receiving permanent residence status at the time of their arrival in Canada, and commented that "migrant students should have the same rights, and that means full labour rights, the same fees, and permanent resident status from day one and that's just fair for the money they spend in Canada." One of their objectives are to equalize their tuition fees to the subsidized fees of domestic students. In 2020, international student bodies across Canada once more pleaded for the same rights being faced with the COVID-19 pandemic.

Top 10 Countries of Origin – International Students (All Levels) in 2023
Country	Number
India	427,085
China	102,150
Philippines	48,870
Nigeria	45,595
France	26,980
Iran	24,460
Nepal	20,465
Vietnam	17,175
Mexico	16,980
South Korea	15,930

International v Canadian students in higher education
Province	International students (%)	Canadian students (%)
British Columbia	16	12
Quebec	15	27
Ontario	53	39
Manitoba	2	3
Saskatchewan	2	3
Alberta	6	10
Atlantic provinces	5	6

== Attitudes towards immigration ==
Public opinion regarding immigration has evolved significantly since the mid-20th century, reflecting the country's changing demographics, economic needs and political climate. Historically shaped by multiculturalism policies in 1970s, Canadian attitude towards have generally been more favorable than in many Western regions, though levels of concern have fluctuated with economic and social conditions.

In 2014, a large majority of the Canadian public as well as the major political parties supported immigration. However, in later years this support declined as public sentiment towards immigration has shifted, with many citizens expressing that the immigration levels are too high. Surveys such as from Environics Institute (2024) found that 58% of Canadians believe the country accepts too many immigrants, up from 14% from 2023. Similarly, some polls such as the Ledger has shown that 75% of Canadians think that higher immigration is exacerbating the housing crisis and putting further pressure on public services such as healthcare and education.

Another prominent issue in public disclosure is concern about the integration of immigrants, with various surveys indicating the problem of integration with the general population and the lack of "Canadian values". This has sparked an unjust rhetoric against immigrants, alongside the increase in hate crimes, racism and has caused anxiety among various segments of the population. At the fringe opinion, ultranationalist, anti-immigration and neo-nazi groups have become more vocal sensing the public unrest. For example, the Storm Alliance has staged various protests against asylum seekers at border crossing points, primarily in Quebec.

Although, most analysts and civil society voices argue that immigrants are being made scapegoats for deeper structural issues. Critics say the blaming newcomers for housing shortages, healthcare strain, or inflation often overlooks factors like insufficient housing supply, zoning laws, underinvestment in public services and the overall inefficiency and incompetency of the government's policies.

The following are public opinion statistics compiled by the Environics Institute between 2022 and 2024:

Canadian public opinion about immigration and refugees by Environics Institute (2024) Question: Is there too much immigration to Canada?
Year	Agree (%)	Disagree (%)
1977	61	35
1980	63	32
1990	57	34
1996	48	46
2000	35	54
2004	33	57
2010	38	53
2014	36	55
2019	30	60
2022	27	69
2024	36	58

Canadian public opinion about immigration and refugees by Environics Institute (2024) Question: Immigration has a positive impact on the economy of Canada
Year	Agree (%)	Disagree (%)
1993	56	39
2022	83	13
2023	74	21
2024	68	26

Reasons why Canadians say there is too much immigration (2022–2024) – Environics Institute
Reason	2022 (%)	2023 (%)	2024 (%)
Housing prices / supply	15	38	33
Weak economy / take jobs from other Canadians	21	25	29
Over-population	19	19	25
Lack of screening and regulation	13	10	21
Drain on public finances	23	25	20
Threat to Canadian or Quebec culture	24	8	10
Public health risk	1	1	4
Too many foreign students	0	4	3
Security and terrorism risk	3	4	3
Other reasons	5	3	5

=== 2016 ===
In October 2016, the Angus Reid Institute partnered with the Canadian Broadcasting Corporation (CBC) to conduct a study of 'Canadian values.' Survey results would indicate that about 68% of those polled said that they wanted minorities to do more to fit into the mainstream. However, the same number also said that they were nonetheless happy with how immigrants have integrated themselves into the community. Moreover, 79% of Canadians believe immigration policy should be based on the country's economic and labour needs, rather than on the needs of foreigners to escape crises in their home countries.

Canada's finance minister Bill Morneau established the Advisory Council on Economic Growth, which called for a gradual increase in permanent immigration to Canada to 450,000 people a year.

In an analysis of the survey, Angus Reid, himself, wrote that Canadians' commitment to multiculturalism is not increasing and that Canadian attitudes have been affected by the wake of North American and European nationalist movements, due to which certain provinces have even begun to develop colourist preferences. Reid also expressed his discomfort in the effect that an increase in illiterate refugees may have on Canadian society. Nonetheless, he found that the majority of newcomers and refugees feel that they are treated fairly and welcomed as a "Canadian."

=== 2017–2018 ===
According to a 2017 poll, 32% of Canadians—up from 30% in 2016—believed that too many refugees were coming to Canada. The poll also asked respondents about their comfortability with surface-level diversity (e.g. around people of a different race), to which 89% said they were comfortable—a number that dropped from 94% in 2005–06.

In 2018, an Angus Reid poll found that two-thirds (67%) of Canadians agreed that the situation of illegal immigration to Canada constitutes a "crisis" and that Canada's "ability to handle the situation is at a limit." Among respondents who voted in the 2015 election, 56% of those who voted Liberal and 55% of those who voted NDP agreed that the matter had reached a crisis level—agreed upon with 87% of respondents who voted Conservative in the 2015 election. Six out of ten respondents also told the pollster that Canada is "too generous" towards would-be refugees, a spike of five percentage points since the question was asked the previous year.

The Coalition Avenir Québec who were elected in the 2018 Quebec election advocated for a reduction to the number of immigrants, to 40,000 for the province of Quebec, a reduction of 20%.

=== 2019 ===
EKOS Research Associates, in a 2019 poll, found that about 40% of Canadians feel that there are too many non-white immigrants coming to the country. EKOS expressed this number as demonstrating an increase from those who opposed immigration in previous years, and as an evidence for resurgence of colonial depictions that can lead to racialization of new non-white immigrants.

In a 2019 poll by Léger Marketing, 63% of respondents wanted limits to be set on immigration, while 37% said immigration should be expanded. The results would show a split along party lines, as Green and Conservative Party supporters favoured a reduction, while Liberal and NDP supporters favoured the opposite. Minister of Immigration, Refugees and Citizenship, Ahmed Hussen felt that the poll results may be indicative of the concerns of some Canadians about housing shortages and the ability of communities to absorb more people.

A Qualtrics poll conducted between 14 August and 12 September 2019 specifically asked about Canadian attitudes towards refugees. The survey found that 36% of respondents thought most people who claim to be refugees were not real refugees, with 34% disagreeing. It also revealed that 32% of respondents believed that Canada should do more to help refugees, with 36% disagreeing. Additionally, the survey indicated that 25% of respondents thought people coming to Canada claiming to be refugees were imposing a severe strain on the welfare system, but most people (50%) disagreed with that statement. Finally, the survey showed that only 21% of respondents believed that being a refugee is a choice and a person's circumstances aren't to blame, with a majority of 54% disagreeing. A subsequent analysis found that anti-refugee sentiments persisted more strongly among people with populist attitudes - on both sides of the political spectrum, i.e. left and right.

=== 2020 ===
In a 2020 poll conducted by Nanos Research Group, 17 percent of respondents said an increase to the number of immigrants accepted into the country (compared to 2019) was acceptable, 36 percent said there should be no change, and 40 percent wanted a reduction. Rima Wilkes, a University of British Columbia professor raised a question about why consultation with First Nations is not made for shaping immigration policies while in almost every aspect there is one when it comes to sharing of unceded land and water resources. Canada Border Services Agency (CBSA) data in 2020 shows that there were 12,122 deportations and out of them 1,657 were administrative removals.

=== 2022 ===
Federal public servants warned the government that high immigration is putting pressure "on health care and affordable housing."

Ukrainian refugees fleeing the Russian invasion of Ukraine approved under the CUAET were allowed to travel to Canada until 31 March 2024. Afterward, they were subject to the standard immigration measures available to others around the world. In 2024, Canada admitted only 6,780 new permanent residents from Ukraine. People coming to Canada from Ukraine under the CUAET scheme were legally considered to be temporary residents rather than refugees. They were granted the right to work or study in Canada for three years but do not get the right to automatic permanent residency like refugees from Syria or Afghanistan.

=== 2023 ===
Polls showed that Canadians are increasingly concerned about the pressure high immigration is putting on housing, services and infrastructure. In a 2023 poll by Léger Marketing, of the 1,529 respondents 9% said immigration should be expanded, 43% said it should not change, and 39% that it should be contracted.

=== 2024 ===
In 2024, Canada admitted a record 483,390 new permanent residents, including 127,320 from India. In March 2024, Canada announced its plans to reduce the number of temporary immigrants by 20% over the next three years, decreasing their population from the current 6.2% to 5%. Canada's plans to cut the number of temporary residents will likely slow down inflation and economic growth and is expected to cut the country's population growth rate in half.

In October 2024, as Canadians endured a cost of living and housing crisis, and Trudeau's unpopularity grew, he announced cuts to immigration targets. The Liberal Party has pledged to reduce the number of permanent residents admitted to Canada to less than 1% of the Canadian population per year, or less than 410,000 by 2025. As per Trudeau's Immigration Levels Plan 2025-2027, Canada's overall planned permanent resident admission targets were 395,000 in 2025, 380,000 in 2026, and 365,000 in 2027. The Conservative Party has promised to reduce the number of permanent residents admitted to Canada to 250,000 per year. The government set levels for temporary migrants in the 2025-27 Levels Plan at 673,650 in 2025, 516,600 in 2026, and 543,600 in 2027.

Anti-immigration sentiment is reported as rising and the immigration rate is viewed as problematic. However, proponents of Century Initiative claim it is lower than in any other country of the Group of Seven and the actual immigration rate is higher.

=== 2025 ===
In March 2025, Canadian prime minister Mark Carney promised to reduce the total number of temporary migrants and international students to less than 5% of the Canadian population by the end of 2027, saying" "It's a sharp drop from the recent high of 7.3 per cent. This will help ease strains on housing, on public infrastructure and social services." Moreover, a significant uptick in hostility toward immigrants has been observed in 2025, as noted by the chief program officer at Calgary's Centre for Newcomers, and has been attributed to policy-induced surges, with blame falling on those arriving rather than those enabling or authoring the strain. Sam Blackett, Alberta premier's press secretary, alluded to entry volumes exceeding opportunity bandwidth and misaligned employment realities, cautioning that overlooked vetting is yielding increasingly recognizable shared frictions.

== History of citizenship and emigration ==
=== Citizenship ===
The word 'Canadian' as a term of nationality or citizenship was first used under the Immigration Act, 1910, to designate those British subjects who were domiciled in Canada, whereas all other British subjects required permission to land. A separate status of "Canadian national" was created under the Canadian Nationals Act, 1921, which would broaden the definition of 'Canadian' to include such citizen's wife and children (fathered by the citizen) who had not yet landed in Canada. After the passage of the Statute of Westminster in 1931, the monarchy ceased to be an exclusively British institution. Thus, Canadians—as well as all others living among what is known today as the Commonwealth realms—were regarded as subjects of the Crown. However, in legal documents, the term 'British subject' continued to be used, hence 'Canadians' were still, officially, British subjects born or regularly domiciled in Canada.

In 1946 Canada was the first nation in the then-British Commonwealth to establish its own nationality law, with the enactment of the Canadian Citizenship Act, 1946, taking effect on 1 January 1947. In order to be deemed a Canadian citizen, one generally had to be a British subject on the date that the Act took effect, or had been admitted to Canada as landed immigrants before that date. First Nations people were later included by amendment in 1956. The phrase 'British subject' referred generally to anyone from the United Kingdom, its colonies at the time, or a Commonwealth country. Acquisition and loss of British-subject status before 1947 was determined by British law.

Many of the provisions to acquire or lose Canadian citizenship that existed under the 1946 legislation were repealed, whereby Canadian citizens generally would no longer be subject to involuntary loss of citizenship, barring revocation on the grounds of immigration fraud. On 15 February 1977, Canada removed restrictions on dual citizenship.

==== Present ====
Canada offers Canadian citizenship through naturalization. In 2006, the Canadian government reduced the landing fee per immigrant by 50%. In June 2017, the implementation of the first of a series of important reforms to the Citizenship Act took effect. These reforms restored many of the previous requirements that were in place for over 3 decades in Canada before they were removed and replaced with more stringent criteria by the former Conservative government in 2015. The most important of these changes include:

- The requirement of permanent residence for 3 out of 5 years during the period immediately prior to filing the application.
- Removal of a physical presence rule.
- Persons aged 14 to 54 years must pass a Canadian knowledge test and demonstrate a basic ability in either of English or French, Canada's official languages.
- Revocation of citizenship must follow a more formal and balanced process.

=== Emigration ===
Migration destination

While emigration from Canada to the United States has historically exceeded immigration, there have been short periods in which the reverse was true, such as:

- during the American Revolution, with the migration of Loyalist refugees;
- during the various gold rushes of British Columbia, and the later Klondike Gold Rush, which saw many American prospectors inhabiting B.C. and the Yukon;
- in the early 20th century, when land settlers moved from the Northern Plains to the Prairies

Immigration has always been offset by emigration: at times this was of great concerns of governments intent on filling up the country, particularly the western provinces. The United States was overall the primary destination followed by reverse migration. As a result, the population of Canada at Confederation (1867) was 3.75 million, or 10% of the US population, an average that maintained from about 1830 to 1870. This number would drop to 6% by 1900 due to large emigration to the US, despite large-scale immigration to Canada. Emigration to the US was only 370,000 in the 1870s; averaged a million a decade from 1880 to 1910; almost 750,000 from 1911 to 1920 and 1.25 million from 1921 to 1930. They consisted of both native-born Canadians and recent immigrants from various, mostly European nations. Between 1945 and 1965, emigration to the US averaged 40–45,000 annually. It was not until 1960 that the population of Canada reached the 10% mark again, or 18 million.

As of 2017, with over 35 million people, Canada has 10.8% of the population of its southern neighbour. In times of economic difficulty, especially during the Great Depression, Canadian governments resorted to deportation and coerced "voluntary" deportation due to the burden that many unemployed workers contributed to the public expense. However, by the time of the administration of Mackenzie King, it was realized that this was an improvident short-term solution that would result in future labour shortages (that immigration was initially intended to overcome).

According to a study conducted by the Conference Board of Canada, each year, about 1% of permanent residents leave Canada. The number of immigrants leaving the country has been rising since the 1990s. Over 25 years, more than 20% of an arrival cohort of immigrants has left Canada. The main reasons to leave are housing affordability, a strained health-care system and underemployment. The share of permanent residents who become citizens within 10 years of arrival dropped by 40% between 2001 and 2021.

== Immigration categories ==
In current Canadian law, immigrants are distinguished by four categories:

1. Family: persons closely related to one or more Canadian residents who live in Canada. (Note: The "family" category can be subdivided into (a) spouse, partner, and children; (b) parents and grandparents; and (c) other (includes "orphaned – brother, sister, nephew, niece and grandchild, and other relatives").)
2. Economic: skilled workers, caregivers, or business persons.
3. Protected person or Refugee: persons who are escaping persecution, torture, and/or cruel and unusual punishment. (Note: The "Protected Persons and Refugees" category can be subdivided into: (a) Protected Persons in Canada and Dependants Abroad; (b) Government-Assisted Refugees (Archived 21 April 2020 at the Wayback Machine) (GARs); (c) Blended Visa Office-Referred Refugees (Archived 21 April 2020 at the Wayback Machine); and (d) Privately Sponsored Refugees.)
4. Humanitarian or other: persons accepted as immigrants for humanitarian or compassionate reasons.

In March 2019, the Canadian Government announced its Francophone Immigration Strategy as an initiative to increase immigration outside of Quebec for French-speaking individuals in all admission categories.

In 2010, Canada accepted 280,681 immigrants (permanent and temporary) of which 186,913 (67%) were Economic immigrants; 60,220 (22%) were Family class; 24,696 (9%) were Refugees; and 8,845 (2%) were others through working holidays, internships, and studies. In 2019, with 341,180 admissions, Canada achieved its highest level of permanent resident admissions in recent history. In 2024, 483,640 permanent residents were admitted to Canada, which is a 2.5% increase from the 471,808 admitted in 2023.

=== Economic immigrants ===
The Economic Immigration Class is the largest source of permanent resident admissions in Canada. In 2019, 196,658 individuals were admitted to Canada under the Economic Class, making up approximately 58% of all admissions that year, and a 5.5% increase from 2018. This represents a record-high number of admissions under this category. In 2024, 281,615 of admissions were economic ones, accounting for 58% that year.

Year	2015	2016	2017	2018	2019	2020	2021	2022	2023	2024
Number of economic immigrants permitted	170,390	156,028	159,289	186,366	196,658	106,422	252,971	255,685	272,744	281,615

IRCC uses several sub-categories of economic immigrants, including skilled workers, under the following classes:

The basic immigration programs that offer permanent admission to Canada to those who are skilled include:

- Quebec skilled worker;
- Federal skilled trades
- Federal skilled worker
- Provincial Nominee Program/class (PNP)

The immigration programs that offer permanent admission to onshore, temporary residents (or who once were) include:

- Canadian experience class: the process is applicable to only those who have a Canadian Experience, they are eligible to apply to any immigration programs through submitting an online profile to the Express Entry pool. The highest ranked candidates are then invited to apply for permanent residence
- Rural and Northern Immigration Program (RNIP)
- Regional Immigration Pilot Program (RIPP)
- Municipal Nominee Immigration Program (MNIP)
- Atlantic Immigration Pilot Program (AIPP)
- Yukon Community Pilot

The refugee immigration programs that offer permanent admission to Canada include:

- Economic Mobility Pathways Pilot (EMPP): for displaced persons

The business immigration programs that offer permanent admission to Canada include:

- Quebec Immigrant Investor Program (QIIP)
- Quebec Entrepreneur Program
- Quebec Self-Employed
- Federal Start-Up Visa program

On 1 May 2014, the Federal Skilled Worker Class accepted 25,000 applicants with intake caps at 1,000 per category. A New Economic Action Plan 2015 took effect in January 2015, in which the skilled worker program shifted away from the more need-based program per labor market demands. The list of accepted occupations for 2014 included occupations such as senior managers, accountants, physicians and medical professionals, professionals in marketing and advertising, real estate professionals and others.

A candidate's eligibility for Federal Skilled Worker category was assessed based on six selection factor points and scored on a scale of 100. The required pass mark was 67 points. Six Selection Factor Points:

- Language skill points based on English and French language proficiency test results
- Education points based on credential evaluation assessment
- Work experience points
- Age points
- Arranged employment in Canada points
- Adaptability points

The changes in 2015 moved permanent residency in Canada away from the "first come, first served" model, which prioritized meeting economic needs. The new reforms aimed to attract permanent residents to increase Canada's tax revenue. This new system, known as "Express Entry," allows individuals from any background to immigrate or obtain permanent residency, regardless of Canada's occupations in demand. Applicants need only meet a lottery-like score range, which varies widely depending on the revenue and partisan-driven policy requirements of the period.

Alberta's Immigrant Nominee Program, in particular, allows skilled workers, along with their families, to make application for permanent residency, and several large Alberta employers with operations in rural areas actively recruit employees from abroad and support them and their families in seeking permanent residency.

Canada announced a new immigration quota of 1.2 million for 2021-2023, with targets of 401,000 new permanent residents in year 2021, 411,000 in 2022 and 421,000 in 2023.

In an effort to meet the 2021 target of required immigrants, on 14 April 2021 Canada created a new immigration pathway to permanent residency for essential workers and international graduates already in Canada. Temporary workers with at least one year of Canadian work experience in a health-care profession or another pre-approved "essential worker" occupation, and international students who graduated from a Canadian institution in 2017 or later were eligible. The maximum numbers of immigrants under this program are 20,000 temporary workers in health care, 30,000 temporary workers in other selected essential occupations, and 40,000 international students.

Permanent Residence wait times for Economic applicants (as of March 2026):

Program	Processing Time
Atlantic Immigration Program	33 months
Canadian Experience Class (CEC)	7 months
Caregivers (all programs)	86 months (as of Jan, 2026)
Provincial Nominee Program: Express Entry	7 months
Provincial Nominee Program	13 months
Self-employed persons (federal)	More than 10 years (as of Jan, 2026)
Quebec Business Class	80 months
Skilled Workers (Federal)	7 months
Skilled Trades (Federal)	N/A
Skilled Workers (Quebec)	11 months
Start-up Visa	More than 10 years

=== Federal Start-Up Visa program ===
This program grants Canadian permanent residence to qualified entrepreneurs wishing to establish their start-up business in Canada. Successful candidates must get the support of one or more of the designated organizations: Venture capital funds, Angel investor groups, Business incubators.

Applicants must also supply proof of sufficient settlement funds to apply for the program. Individuals with a certain net worth can also apply for permanent residence via certain programs. For business owners and investor immigrants who do not fit into the Start-Up business class or Quebec Provincial programs, there is a Federal Owner Operator LMIA pathway that if executed correctly can lead to permanent admission to Canada.

Canada revoked most of the poorly monitored business-class programs, like the VIP Business Immigration Program which allowed immigrants with sufficient business experience or management experience to receive the Permanent Residency to start businesses in a shorter period than other types of immigration in 2014 and replaced the program with start-up visa. Daniel Hiebert, a former professor at the University of British Columbia (UBC), discovered that many entrepreneurs who initiated businesses through the old start-up program ceased operations after two years. These individuals met the minimum criteria for obtaining permanent resident status and subsequently let go of their businesses without having their status revoked. Hiebert revealed that they entered business-class programs with the primary goal of retiring and enjoying a comfortable lifestyle. They purchased expensive homes in urban areas to benefit from low mortgage rates and reduced income taxes that Canada offers. An added advantage for many was their children were able to attend at top-tier Canadian Universities at domestic tuition rates.

The government has increased the number of participants in the Start-Up Visa program annually since 2022. In that year, it provided 1,000 spots. In 2023, the program expanded to accommodate 3,500 individuals. The projected intake for 2024 is 5,000 participants, followed by an increase to 6,000 in 2025.

As of March 2026, the Start-Up Visa program is paused and not accepting any new applicants, although individuals with valid 2025 commitment certificates are able until June, 30, 2026 to submit an application. The current processing time for recent applicants is more than 10 years.

=== Family class ===
Both citizens and permanent residents may sponsor family members to immigrate to Canada as permanent residents, under the requirement that the sponsor is able to accept financial responsibility for the individual for a given period of time.

In 2019, 91,311 individuals were admitted under the Family Reunification category, which is a 7.2% increase from 2018 and a record high. Also that year, 80% of parent and grandparent applications were processed within 19 months, an improvement from 72 months in 2017.

As of 2026, the Parents and Grandparents Program (PGP) is closed to new applicants, meaning that Canadians and permanent residents wishing to sponsor a parent or grandparent, will now only be able to apply for them to come to Canada through the non-permanent Super Visa Program.

The estimated wait time for new or recent applicants in March 2026 varies by the individual being sponsored:

- Spouse/partner currently in Canada, expecting to live outside Quebec - 21 months
- Spouse/partner currently in Canada, expecting to live in Quebec - 35 months
- Spouse/partner currently NOT in Canada, expecting to live outside Quebec - 15 months
- Spouse/partner currently NOT in Canada, expecting to live in Quebec - 35 months
- Dependant child currently in Canada - 20 months
- Dependant child currently NOT in Canada - *Varies* (Places like India are 8 months, while the Philippines is at 12 months, and Cameroon is at 28 months)
- Parents and grandparents expecting to live outside Quebec - 35 months
- Parents and grandparents expecting to live in Quebec - 47 months
- Adoptive child/other relative currently in Canada - 19 months
- Adoptive child/other relative currently NOT in Canada - *Varies* (Places like Ethiopia have processing times of 22 months, while places like Haiti have expected wait times of 47 months)

Year	2015	2016	2017	2018	2019	Projected		
Year	2015	2016	2017	2018	2019	2021	2022	2023
Spouse, partners and children	49,997	60,955	61,973	67,140	69,298			
Parent and grandparent	15,489	17,043	20,495	18,030	22,011			
Total family reunification	65,485	77,998	82,468	85,170	91,311	76,000–105,000	74,000–105,000	74,000–106,000

=== Humanitarian and compassionate immigration ===
Canada also grants permanent residency based on humanitarian and compassionate grounds on a case-by-case basis, or certain public policy considerations under exceptional circumstances. In 2019, there were 4,681 permanent residents admitted through these streams.

In 2026, the processing time for new and recent applicants is more than 10 years, with some sources reporting a potential wait of up to 50 years.

Year	2019	2020	2021	2022	2023	2024
People admitted under humanitarian and compassionate grounds	4,681	4,500	5,775	10,199	14,355	19,355

=== Refugees and protected persons ===
Each year, IRCC facilitates the admission of a targeted number of permanent residents under the refugee resettlement category. Under Canadian nationality law, an immigrant can apply for citizenship after living in Canada for 1095 days (3 years) in any five-year period provided that they lived in Canada as a permanent resident for at least two of those years. Opposition parties have advocated for providing one-year free residency permits for refugees as an opportunity to increase their living standards until they are ready to migrate back to their home countries, rather than uprooting them from their heritage and culture in forms of relief.

The CBSA is responsible for administering persons who enter Canada through its designated ports of entry; the Royal Canadian Mounted Police (RCMP) are responsible for those who enter Canada unlawfully, i.e., enter between designated ports of entry.

A person who is seeking asylum in Canada must be first considered eligible by the Immigration and Refugee Board of Canada. The Immigration and Refugee Board classifies eligible refugees into two separate categories:

- Convention Refugees: Someone who is outside and unable to return to their home country due to a fear of persecution based on several factors including race, religion, and political opinion. (This is outlined by the United Nations' multilateral treaty, Convention Relating to the Status of Refugees.)
- Protected Persons: Claims for asylum under this category are usually made at a point of entry into Canada. Those claiming to be a person in need of protection must be unable to return to their home country safely because they would be subjected to a danger of torture, risk for their life, or risk of cruel and unusual treatment.

Refugee statistics, by sponsorship
Year	2015	2016	2017	2018	2019
Blended Sponsorship Refugee	811	4,435	1,285	1,149	993
Government-Assisted Refugee	9,488	23,628	8,638	8,093	9,951
Privately Sponsored Refugee	9,747	18,642	16,699	18,568	19,143
Total	20,046	46,705	26,622	27,810	30,087

==== Claiming asylum in Canada ====
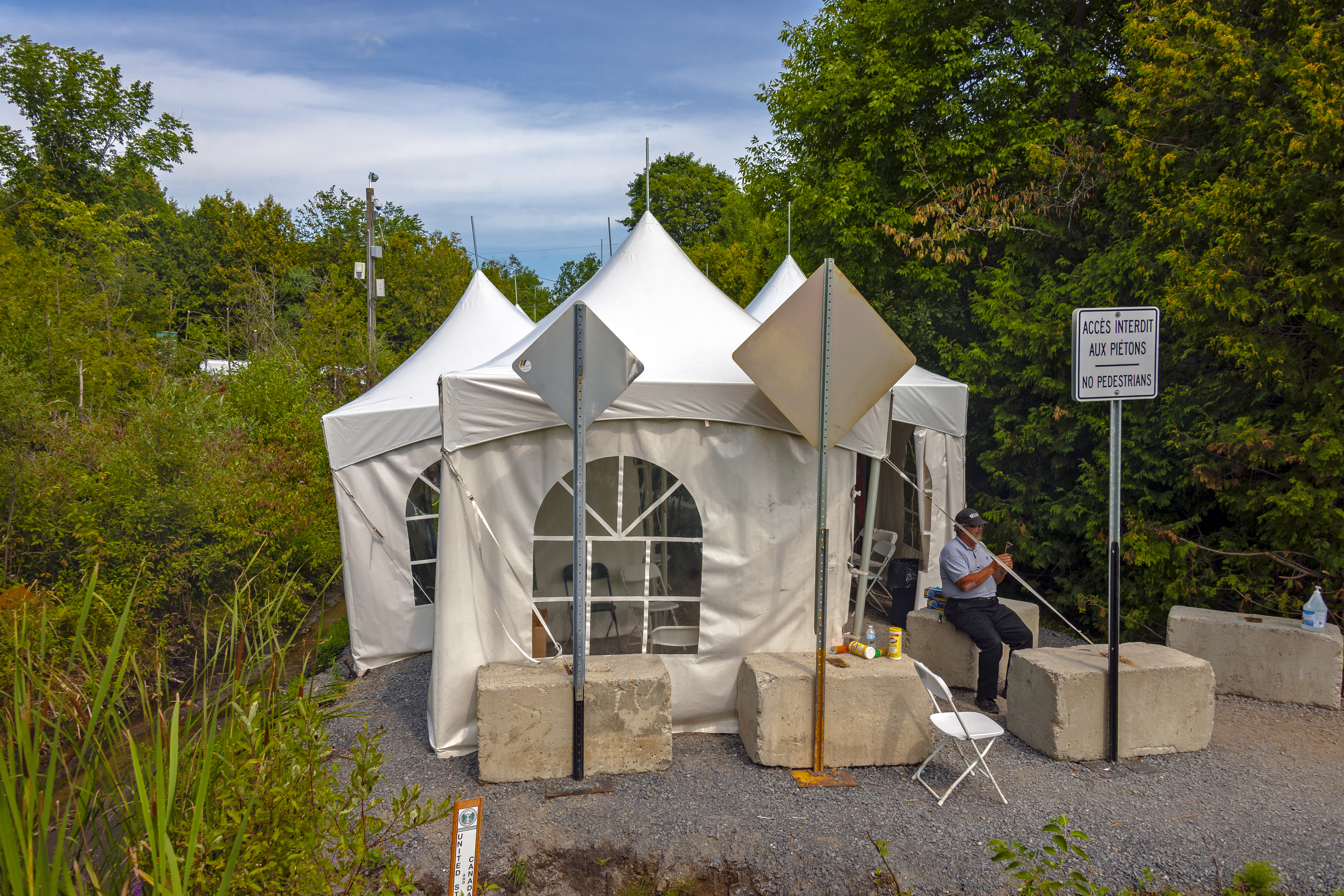
Tents set up on the Canadian side of border between Quebec and New York in 2017 to process asylum applicants entering Canada irregularly.

Individuals can make an asylum claim in Canada at a port of entry, at a CBSA inland office or an IRCC inland office. CBSA or IRCC officials will then determine if an individual is eligible to make an asylum claim.

After entry, an interview for eligibility is conducted to deem whether the asylum seeker is allowed or declined admission into Canada. Those who are admitted submit their reasons for admissibility, in writing. The Immigration and Refugee Board hears their case after 60 days; in favourable terms, the claimants are accepted as refugees. If the claims are not deemed appropriate by the interviewer, the asylum seeker may be deported.

According to the Canadian government, anyone can make a claim for refugee protection once they are physically present in Canada, regardless of how they arrived in the country. This includes those who have entered Canada without proper documentation or who have overstayed their visas. Asylum seekers can make a claim at a port of entry, such as an airport or border crossing, or at an inland office of Immigration, Refugees and Citizenship Canada (IRCC). Claiming asylum in Canada can be a complex and lengthy process, and there are many factors that can affect an individual's chances of success. For example, the availability of evidence to support the individual's claim, the individual's ability to communicate effectively in English or French, and the political climate in their home country can all have an impact on the outcome of the asylum claim.

There are many instances in which claims have been deemed ineligible for referral to the Immigration and Refugee Board, notably those by migrants who seek entry into Canada through the United States, where the Safe Third Country Agreement is applied. The agreement dictates persons seeking asylum must make their claim in the first country in which they arrive—either the US or Canada—unless they qualify for an exception. Therefore, if an asylum seeker were to enter the US (as a non-U.S. citizen), make their way to the Canada–U.S. land border, and then attempt to enter Canada with a claim for asylum, they would be denied entry under the agreement. The agreement is also responsible for limiting refugee eligibility to enter Canada and the rejection of several hundred claims a year since its implementation. The CBSA reported that 6,000–14,000 claims were made before the implementation of the agreement, and dropped to an average of 4,000 claims per year after its implementation.

In 2026, the Strengthening Canada’s Immigration System and Borders Act received royal assent and introduced new restrictions on eligibility requirements for asylum claims to be referred to the Immigration and Refugee Board, notably a one-year limit starting from a claimant's first entry into Canada after June 24, 2020, regardless of whether the claimant has since left the country and later returned. Further restrictions were set on claimants entering Canada through Canada-US land borders, who must file claims within 14 days to be referred to the Immigration and Refugee Board.

Asylum claimants have been subjected to "indirect refoulment", a consequence of a person's claim in Canada being refused under the Safe Third Country Agreement, subjecting them to deportation to the destination in which the person was originally seeking asylum from, due to more conservative immigration and refugee policies in the U.S.

==== Protected persons ====
The IRCC provides support for protected persons and their dependants, whereby protected persons are defined as asylum claimants who are granted protected status by Canada. In 2019, 18,443 individuals obtained permanent residence under the protected persons in Canada and dependents abroad category.

Year	2015	2016	2017	2018	2019
People admitted as protected persons and dependents	12,068	12,209	14,499	17,683	18,443

==== Refugees in detention ====
As part of the passing of Bill C-31 in December 2012, asylum seekers arriving at a point of entry on the Canada–United States border have been subject to incarceration and detention. Claimants are subject to detention for failing to provide sufficient identification documents, which is in violation with the United Nations Refugee Convention, to which Canada is a signatory. In 2010–2011, Canada detained 8,838 people, of which 4,151 of them were asylum seekers or rejected refugee claimants. There is a requirement to the maximum time limit spent in detention upon being released, a situation which has been subject to criticism held in contrast to areas in Europe: Ireland (30 days), France (32 days), Spain (40 days), and Italy (60 days).

==== Refugees programs ====
The IRCC funds several programs that provide supports and services to resettled refugees.

The Private Sponsorship of Refugees Program is an initiative whereby refugees may resettle in Canada with support and funding from private or joint government-private sponsorship. Established under Operation Lifeline in 1978, the program has since resettled and provided support for over 200,000 refugees under various initiatives and with fluctuating annual intakes.

Pre-departure services backed by IRCC include Canadian Orientation Abroad training and coverage for certain medical services received prior to arriving in Canada. All resettled refugees in Canada receive temporary health care coverage; the IRCC, along with civil-society and sponsorship organizations, also provide:

- income support
- immediate and essential supports and services upon arrival (e.g., housing)
  - assistance in securing housing
- settlement services, including language training
- Other refugee-support programs

==== Asylum statistics ====
Individuals can make an asylum claim in Canada at a port of entry, at a CBSA inland office or an IRCC inland office. CBSA or IRCC officials will then determine if an individual is eligible to make an asylum claim.

Asylum claimants processed by the IRCC and CBSA, Jan–Nov 2020
Province / Territory	CBSA ports of entry	CBSA inland office	CBSA total	IRCC total	CBSA and IRCC total
Alberta	85	— (Note: All values between 0 and 5 are shown as "—" in order to prevent individuals from being identified when data is compiled and compared to other publicly available statistics. All other values are rounded to the closest multiple of 5 for the same reason; as a result of rounding, data may not sum to the totals indicated.)	85	760	845
British Columbia	225	140	365	1,705	2,070
Manitoba	30	—	30	135	165
New Brunswick	5	0	5	30	35
Newfoundland and Labrador	0	—	—	5	5
Nunavut	0	0	0	0	0
Northwest Territories	0	0	0	0	0
Nova Scotia	—	—	—	55	55
Ontario	2,070	95	2165	7,875	10,040
Prince Edward Island	0	0	0	10	10
Quebec	4,730	80	4810	4,575	9,385
Saskatchewan	5	—	5	30	35
Yukon	0	0	0	—	0
Total	7,150	315	7,465	15,180	22,645

RCMP interceptions, Jan–Nov 2020
Province / Territory	Total
Alberta	0
British Columbia	76
Manitoba	26
New Brunswick	0
Newfoundland and Labrador	1
Nunavut	0
Northwest Territories	0
Nova Scotia	0
Ontario	0
Prince Edward Island	0
Quebec	3,163
Saskatchewan	0
Yukon	0
Total	3,266

=== Francophone Immigration Strategy ===
In March 2019, the Canadian Government announced its Francophone Immigration Strategy purposed to achieve a target of 4.4% of French-speaking immigrants of all admissions, outside of Quebec, by 2023.

The strategy's Welcoming Francophone Communities Initiative provides $12.6 million to 14 selected communities (2020 to 2023) for projects to support and welcome French-speaking newcomers. In 2019, IRCC's Settlement Program launched new official-language training services for French-speaking newcomers who settle in Francophone communities outside of Quebec. Seven organizations were selected to receive up to $7.6 million over 4 years.

French-speaking permanent residents admitted outside Quebec in 2019
Immigration categories	Total	Percentage
Economic class	5,523	65%
Family-sponsored	1,420	17%
Resettled refugees and protected persons (Note: Resettled refugees and protected persons in-Canada and dependants abroad)	1,445	17%
Other immigrants	81	1%
Total	8,469	100%

=== Types of immigration ===
Every year IRCC announces new targets for the amount of permanent residents expected to be admitted the following three years.

Pie chart of new permanent residents to be admitted from 2026-2028
1. Economic 729,200 (64.0%)
2. Family 246,000 (21.6%)
3. Refugees and Protected Persons 147,900 (13.0%)
4. Humanitarian & Compassionate and Other 16,900 (1.48%)

=== Immigration eligibility and admissions ===
Permanent Residents planned to be admitted (2026–2028)
Category	Sub-category	Information	2026	2027	2028
Combined	Total (All)	Those who are granted permanent residency each year.	380,000^{a}	380,000^{a}	380,000^{a}
Economic based	Federal High Skilled	Those accepted through the Federal Skilled Worker Program, the Federal Skilled Trades Program, and Canadian Experience Class.	109,000	111,000	111,000
Economic based	Federal Business	Those accepted through the Start-up Visa Program and the Self-employed Persons Program.	500	500	500
Economic based	Federal Economic Pilots	Those accepted through multiple different immigration pilot programs.	8,175	8,775	8,775
Economic based	Atlantic Immigration Program	Skilled workers or international graduates who are accepted, through the Atlantic Immigration Program, to settle in one of the Atlantic provinces.	4,000	4,000	4,000
Economic based	Provincial Nomination Program	Workers, students, or business people who applied through a specific PNP program, and have been approved to settle in a specific province (except Nunavut and Quebec).	91,500	92,500	92,500
Economic based	Quebec (Skilled Worker and Business)	Individuals selected by Quebec to settle in the province. Government of Quebec has yet to announce potential targets. See the Canada-Quebec Accord.	TBD	TBD	TBD
Economic based	Total	Economic immigrants admitted to Canada through all related pathways.	239,800	244,700	244,700
Family based	Spouses, Partners, Children	Individuals who have been successfully sponsored by Canadian citizens or permanent residents. Those sponsored as children must be under 22 years of age, unless they have a mental or physical condition thats makes it impossible to financially support themself.	69,000	66,000	66,000
Family based	Parents and Grandparents	Those who are successfully sponsored as parents or grandparents of Canadian citizens or permanent residents.	15,000	15,000	15,000
Family based	Total	Family sponsored immigrants who have been admitted to Canada through all related pathways.	84,000	81,000	81,000
Refugees and Protected Persons	Protected Persons in Canada and Dependants Abroad	Those with protected person status that have been approved for permanent residence, both for themselves and their dependants abroad.	20,000	20,000	20,000
Refugees and Protected Persons	Resettled Refugees - Government Assisted	Individuals who have been accepted, that have been financially supported by the Government of Canada. Could also include human rights defenders.	13,250	13,250	13,250
Refugees and Protected Persons	Resettled Refugees - Blended Visa Office Referred	Those granted permanent residence, that came to Canada receiving financial support from both the Canadian government and a private sponsor (who is usually a Canadian citizen or permanent resident).	50	50	50
Refugees and Protected Persons	Resettled Refugees - Privately Sponsored	Individuals who were approved for permanent residence, that had been exclusively sponsored by ordinary individuals, organizations, or religious groups.	16,000	16,000	16,000
Refugees and Protected Persons	Total	Those granted PR as refugees and protected persons through all related pathways.	49,300	49,300	49,300
Humanitarian & Compassionate and all Other Cases	Humanitarian and Compassionate	Those approved, because the Government had deemed them to be of public interest.	1,100	1,000	1,000
Humanitarian & Compassionate and all Other Cases	Other	Those who have applied and been granted permanent residence in response to Canada's current response in Sudan, Ukraine, and Hong Kong. Other potential situations fit into this category.	5,800	4,000	4,000
Humanitarian & Compassionate and all Other Cases	Total	Individuals given PR status under Humanitarian & Compassionate circumstances, as well as all other situations not accounted for.	6,900	5,000	5,000
^{a} 350,000–420,000 individuals to be admitted.

== Accommodations and inclusivity ==
=== Social contract ===
In the Canadian context, Augie Fleras, a sociology professor at the University of Waterloo, explains that immigration is predicated on the social contract Canada offers to address the fears and desires of immigrants regarding social mobility, stability, and self-worth in exchange for their talent and time. The Canadian standard route for immigration assesses their abilities through a point system to issue an invitation letter seeking their services, identified as an extension of the social contract with immigrants that is assumed to take effect upon their arrival in Canada. Fleras notes that for Canada to honor this social contract, it must genuinely require immigrants' services, have established systems of fairness and opportunity, enacted policies and laws to dismantle discriminatory and gatekeeping barriers, and removed obstacles hindering productive participation in the economy and community, among others. However, Fleras also observes that Canada has historically failed to deliver on these expectations, with some critics of the Harper government noting that even protocols were established to "foster a citizenship of fear" during the period, rather than fostering a reciprocal relationship of citizenship. In 2023, a study revealed that economic immigrants who have chosen Canada as their home are increasingly opting not to stay, largely due to Canada's failure to fulfill its promises. The study labeled the immigration system a "leaky bucket" and identified this as a serious threat to Canada's prosperity. It also highlighted that part of the problem stems from an obsolete perception that welcoming new Canadians is an act of generosity rather than a strategic ambition—a viewpoint that has significantly shaped many systemic structures and immigrant touchpoints. A 2024 consultation on immigration levels revealed that 69% of respondents believe the federal government should actively address barriers to the labor market integration of foreign-educated workers. For instance, Newfoundland and Labrador have faced a shortage of social work staff since 2023 but have been unable to recruit enough social workers. Despite this growing demand, their approach to integrating foreign-educated social workers remains unchanged. Following the example of some other provinces, they continue to use the controversial U.S. examination ASWB rather than adopting supervised support and integration pathways to fill social work vacancies. Many categories selected for welcoming foreign-educated workers as permanent residents face similar challenges related to provincial labor market integration, with foreign individuals being welcomed for national needs without any federal government interventions to ensure their integration. Additionally, the social contract with the existing Canadian population is fraught with challenges. In 2024, an Angus Reid survey found that 42% of native-born young Canadians are considering moving to another country due to the complex economic and sociopolitical climate in Canada.

=== Disabilities ===
In 2011 and 2012, several families were denied immigration to Canada because members of their family have an autism spectrum diagnosis and Citizenship and Immigration Canada (now IRCC) felt the potential cost of care for those family members would place an excessive demand on health or social services. People with autism disorders can be accepted if they are able to depend on themselves. According to the Canadian Human Rights Act, discrimination based on disability is prohibited in all areas of society, including housing. Therefore, it is essential for the accommodation industry in Canada to provide accessible accommodations for disabled people. There are various types of accommodations available in Canada for disabled people, including hotels, motels, bed and breakfasts, resorts, and other types of lodging. The housing and support services for individuals with disabilities are the focus of several non-profit organizations in Canada. The Canadian Association for Community Living (CACL) is one such group that promotes the rights of those with disabilities and offers housing and other services to both individuals and families. Several housing initiatives, including group homes and supportive housing, are run by the CACL around the nation.

=== Job market and education ===
The federal government was requested by businesses to expand programs aimed at helping professional immigrants gain Canadian-specific occupational knowledge and professional insights in their respective fields. In response, the Canadian Council on Learning was created to promote best practices in workplace learning. Immigrant workers' qualifications or credentials are assessed by Canadian agencies through the IRCC for immigration. Ideally, this credential equalization assessment reduces the gap between education and suitable jobs. However, strains of discrimination, i.e. statistical discrimination lead to a systemic process of rejecting and discouraging immigrants (racialization), which is an antithesis for an anti-oppressive culture. In 2023, discrimination against immigrants in Canada based on their origin and color was reported to be at a high 22 percent. In 2022, a significant portion (43 - 47%) of late Millennials and early Generation Z, the working population in Canada, finds that their country and societal systems have a racial bias. In response, PC Premier Doug Ford introduced Bill 149 to attempt to counter this, banning the requirement of Canadian work experience. A 2021 study reveals that 71 percent of the Canadian workforce experienced workplace harassment and violence, and workplace prevention policies for penalizing harassers were mostly just paper tigers and remained only on paper.

Across Canada, businesses have proposed to allow unpaid or basic-pay internships as part of a rewards system, which were considered illegal (both in government and private) in many provinces at the time, which posed a major obstacle to integrate immigrants into the job market. The lack of collective ethnic bargaining and active citizenship from minority immigrants, and the lack of policy leadership in this sector from the government has resulted in a "catch-22" situation in which employers want job experience, but potential employees cannot get Canadian experience without first working in Canadian jobs/internships. The Ontario Human Rights Commission has acknowledged the racist effects of Canadian work experience requirement for jobs, and has declared it to be "prima facie discrimination," and an inadmissible criterion for exclusion of applicants. However, this and the employment equity act has not translated into a nationwide inclusive policy.

An article points out that simply increasing immigration levels without considering the underlying issues in the labor market may not effectively address skills shortages or unemployment rates. Experts emphasize the importance of aligning immigration policies with targeted skills training programs to ensure that incoming immigrants possess the skills needed in the labor market. Furthermore, they stress the significance of investing in education and upskilling programs for both newcomers and the existing workforce to bridge the skills gap. The 1966 White Paper on Immigration advocated for the selection of skilled immigrants, as an influx of unskilled immigrants during a strong economy could exacerbate poverty issues during economic downturns. In 1994, the Chretien Liberals prioritized immigrants with skills and abilities conducive to higher incomes and economic growth, reducing reliance on social welfare. However, despite the White Paper on Immigration's anti-discriminatory stance, achieving full economic and social inclusion for immigrants remained elusive. They often encounter explicit and implicit oppression due to the absence of policies aimed at preventing and penalizing it. This policy of inaction and wanton disregard echoes historical Canadian policies that marginalized Chinese immigrants following the completion of the railway in 1885. Many observe Canada faces the same "soft trade barriers" that it has been facing for more than half a century with regards to helping immigrants transition into careers they were trained for or to better careers even with Canada's modern educational capacity and political opportunity that can fix them.

==== Quebec ====
In 2017, the Province of Quebec stated that they will prohibit offering or receiving public services for individuals who cover their face, such as those who wear chadors, niqabs or burqas. The reasoning behind the bill was to ensure protection of Quebecois, but the discriminatory strain of the political ideology was reported to be aimed at articles of certain religious faiths. The bill would come under question of in regards to Canadian policy on religious tolerance and accommodation. A qualitative study found that taste-based discrimination is more prevalent in cities than semi-urban areas, as major factors that contribute to less hostility seem to be regional differences in industrial composition and attendant labour demand. There have been demands for the province to charge additional fees from immigrants before landing in Quebec. Quebecois have also urged the province to impose French language training in order for newcomers to become better integrated with the language and culture of their communities. As a result the government initiated a subsidized linguistic integration program in 2019.

Recently, the province saw a 20% gap in earnings between immigrants and Canadian-born individuals in Quebec, largely due to the discrepancy between their respective literacy rates. In 2008, the Canadian Council on Learning reported that almost half of Canadian adults fall below the internationally-accepted literacy standard for coping in a modern society.

In late 2019, under Coalition Avenir Québec (CAQ) government they introduced a Quebec values test where immigrants would have to pass.

During the 2022 Quebec general election, the Coalition Avenir Québec (CAQ) government of François Legault, which increased its majority, ran on getting more immigration powers from Canada to the Province of Quebec. Legault has raised the idea of even having referendum on immigration powers.

After their election win they repeated their pledge for Quebec getting more immigration powers.

== See also ==
- Canada immigration statistics
  - Annual immigration statistics of Canada
- Canada (Citizenship and Immigration) v. Khosa
- Century Initiative—a lobby group pushing for increased immigration to Canada
- History of Chinese immigration to Canada
- Immigrant benefits urban legend—a hoax regarding benefits comparison
- Ministry of Immigration, Diversity and Inclusion—government of Quebec's immigration department
- Opposition to immigration
  - Immigration Watch Canada—a lobby group pushing for reducing immigration into Canada
- Racism in Canada
- Remigration
- Dominion Society of Canada
- Visa policy of Canada
