= SINP =

SINP may refer to:

- Saha Institute of Nuclear Physics, a research institute in Bidhannagar, Kolkata, India
- Saskatchewan Immigrant Nominee Program, an immigration scheme of Saskatchewan, Canada
