= Maple Match =

- Website type: Online dating service
- Available in: English
- Founded: May 2016
- Owner: Joe Goldman
- Website: www.maplematch.com
- Launched: 2016; 10 years ago

Maple Match was a proposed online dating service with the stated goal of matching Americans with Canadian citizens for romantic partnerships that would also allow these Americans to immigrate to Canada. The company was founded by Joe Goldman in Austin, Texas.

The site first launched in May 2016 after Donald Trump became the presumptive nominee of the Republican Party and in its first week, approximately 13,000 people had requested to join, a quarter of whom were Canadian - even though the app was still unreleased. The company reported that its user base "almost doubled" when Trump's victory was announced on the night of the 2016 United States presidential election. Goldman has responded to claims that the site is satirical by maintaining that it is a completely serious dating service.

As of September 2020, the application has not been launched and the website has expired.
