= Provincial Nomination Program =

Immigration programs by the Government of Canada

The Provincial Nominee Program (PNP) is a set of Canadian immigration programs operated by the Government of Canada in partnership with individual provinces, each of which having its own requirements and 'streams' (i.e., target groups). In a program stream, provinces and territories may, for example, target: business people, students, skilled workers, or semi-skilled workers.

While provincial governments manage PNPs according to their individual objectives, the federal government's immigration department, Immigration, Refugees and Citizenship Canada, ultimately administers and decides on permanent residence applications. Examples of these programs include the Alberta Immigrant Nominee Program, the Atlantic Immigration Pilot Program, and the BC Provincial Nominee Program.

== Alberta Immigrant Nominee Program ==
The Alberta Immigrant Nominee Program (AINP) is an economic immigration program that nominates people for permanent residence (PR) in Alberta.

To be eligible, nominees must either have skills that satisfy job shortages in Alberta or be preparing to buy or begin a business in the province. Those nominated through the program may apply for PR status together with their spouse or common-law partner, and dependent children, but must also be able to provide for their families.

The AINP has 2 streams for foreign workers who are living and working—or plan to live and work—in Alberta:

1. Alberta Opportunity Stream: For eligible candidates who live and work in Alberta and have a job offer from an Alberta employer
2. Alberta Express Entry Stream: Eligible candidates with an Express Entry profile may be invited by AINP to apply for a PR nomination.

The AINP has 2 streams for entrepreneurs who plan to live in Alberta and buy or begin a business in the province:

1. International Graduate Entrepreneur Immigration Stream: Beginning on 26 October 2020, International graduates from approved Alberta post-secondary institutions who wish to launch a business or buy an existing business in Alberta can submit an Expression of Interest (EOI).
2. Self-Employed Farmer Stream: Experienced farmers who plan to buy or start a farm in Alberta can apply for PR.
3. Foreign Graduate Start-up Visa Stream: Beginning January 2021, this stream will be used to attract "talented international graduates" from top American universities and colleges to begin businesses and settle in Alberta.

== Atlantic Immigration Pilot Program ==
The Atlantic Immigration Pilot Program (AIPP) began as a pilot program in 2017, but IRCC plans to make it permanent. Nova Scotia, New Brunswick, Newfoundland and Labrador, and Prince Edward Island are the four Atlantic provinces where the AIPP operates.

Employers are not required to obtain a Labour Market Impact Assessment under the AIPP. The quota for the Atlantic Provinces Program was 2,000 people in 2017; it was increased to 6,000 people in 2021.

AIPP offers 2 categories for people who qualify for a nomination:

1. Skilled Worker Stream:
  - Atlantic High-Skilled Program (AHSP). This subcategory is for high-skilled workers who have received a permanent job offer of at least one year.
  - Atlantic Intermediate-Skilled Program (AISP). This subcategory is for mid-level skilled workers, including truck drivers.
2. International Education Stream:
  - Atlantic International Graduate Program (AIGP). This subcategory is for Graduate Masters in which applicants are required to hold a degree from an eligible university in the Atlantic region.

== BC Provincial Nominee Program ==
The BC Provincial Nominee Program (BC PNP) is an immigration program for British Columbia that gives "high-demand foreign workers and experienced entrepreneurs" the opportunity to become a permanent resident in BC.

The BC PNP offers 2 pathways to obtain a permanent residence in BC, each containing different streams one can apply under, depending on their National Occupational Classification skill level, job, or international-student status:

1. Skills Immigration: This stream, primarily using a points-based invitation system, is for skilled and semi-skilled workers in high-demand occupations in BC. Candidates may not need prior work experience for some categories; however, Entry-Level and Semi-Skilled category applicants require B.C. work experience. Candidates may have work experience from abroad; and recent international graduates of a Canadian post-secondary institution may not need any work experience, depending on the job being offered.
  - BC PNP Tech: Those in specific tech occupations may qualify for invitation at a lower points threshold and receive priority assignment for processing.
  - Express Entry: International Student and Skilled Worker candidates can select either the Express Entry or Standard version of the BC PNP streams. Express Entry streams offer shorter timelines for federal permanent residence application processing.
  - Priority Occupations: Since 2022, the BC PNP has also provided occupation specific invitations to apply at lower point thresholds based on specific occupations in education, healthcare and veterinary care.
  - Health Authority and International Post-Graduate Streams - Qualifying candidates, such a those with a job offer from a public health authority or those who've graduated from selected programs at BC post-secondary institutions, can apply directly to the program without registering, obtaining a score and being invited to apply.
2. Entrepreneur Immigration: This stream, using a points-based invitation system, is for experienced entrepreneurs who wish to actively manage a business in BC. Applicants must create a minimum number of jobs, have the required personal net worth, and make a minimum level of eligible investment.
  - Entrepreneur Immigration – Regional Pilot: an option for entrepreneurs who wish to start a new business in participating regional communities across BC.
  - Entrepreneur Immigration – Base: an option for entrepreneurs who wish to acquire or start a new business in the province.
  - Strategic Projects: an option for international companies seeking to expand into BC, and who require permanent residency for key employees.

== Manitoba Provincial Nominee Program ==
The Manitoba Provincial Nominee Program (MPNP) is the immigration program for the province of Manitoba. The MPNP allows Manitoba to nominate qualified applicants for Canadian permanent resident status, and is primarily divided into 3 streams with each stream subdivided into categories for different types of candidates: the Skilled Worker Stream, the International Education Stream, and the Business Investor Stream.

The program accounts for more than three-quarters of all new immigrants arriving in Manitoba, and is seen as the main driver for the increased population growth. The program has enabled a resurrection of immigration from Ukraine to Manitoba, which had almost stopped in the early 1990s. An estimated 250 people a year have emigrated from Ukraine in the last 12 years.

=== Qualification parameters ===
The program is primarily divided for different types of candidates into 3 streams, with each stream subdivided into categories, each with their own sets of eligibility criteria:

1. Skilled Worker Stream
  - Skilled Workers in Manitoba: Targets foreign nationals who have work experience in Manitoba or a job offer from a Manitoba employer, and who demonstrate they have the necessary qualifications to succeed in Manitoba's workforce. The MPNP calculator helps assess eligibility for skilled worker immigration to Manitoba. It considers factors like age, education, work experience, language proficiency, and Manitoba ties to generate a points score."
  - Skilled Workers Overseas: Targets foreign nationals who have work experience in one of Manitoba's in-demand occupations and can demonstrate that they have the work experience needed to succeed in the Manitoba's workforce.
2. International Education Stream: Targets foreign nationals who have recently completed higher education at an institution in Manitoba.
  - Career Employment Pathway
  - Graduate Internship Pathway
  - International Student Entrepreneur Pilot
3. Business Investor Stream: Targets foreign nationals with entrepreneurial experience who wish to undertake an entrepreneurial investment in Manitoba.
  - Entrepreneur Pathway
  - Farm Investor Pathway

In addition, there are federal standards for immigration that can make a person inadmissible for reasons such as posing a security threat, having a history of criminal behaviour, or having a medical condition that poses a threat to public safety.

=== Procedure ===
Application procedure for the Manitoba Provincial Nominee Program varies depending on the stream and program to which a person is applying. Generally, all streams follow a 3-step application process:

1. Expression of Interest: Interested candidates must express interest in applying to their program of choice. This varies from program to program. Certain programs allow candidates to submit an Expression of Interest (EOI) online, while other programs require candidates to attend an information session or conduct an exploratory visit before submitting their EOI.
2. Provincial Application: If an EOI is approved, the candidate receives a Letter of Advice to Apply (LAA) from the province. This LAA authorizes the candidate to submit an official application to Manitoba for provincial nomination.
3. Federal Application: All Canadian permanent residency applications must be approved by the federal government, so after receiving a provincial nomination, an applicant must submit another application at the federal level for permanent residency.

If an applicant's federal application is approved, they are granted Canadian permanent resident status for themselves and any accompanying family members included on their application.

Manitoba regularly conducts Expression of Interest (EOI) draws to issue Letter of Advice to Apply (LOAA) to eligible candidates.

Manitoba EIO draws, 2020
Draw #	Date	LOAA issued
96	August 13, 2020	253
95	July 30, 2020	199
94	July 16, 2020	174
93	July 2, 2020	125
92	June 19, 2020	181
91	June 4, 2020	124
90	May 21, 2020	99
89	May 7, 2020	123
88	April 23, 2020	123
87	April 9, 2020	153
86	March 26, 2020	226
85	March 12, 2020	222
84	February 27, 2020	217
83	February 13, 2020	242
82	January 30, 2020	181
81	January 17, 2020	249
80	January 2, 2020	186

== Northwest Territories Nominee Program ==
The Northwest Territories Nominee Program (NTNP) provides opportunities to immigrate to the Northwest Territories through the following two streams:

1. Business Stream: This stream, delivered by the Department of Industry, Tourism and Investment, is for those who wish to open a business in the NWT, or purchase—or invest in and operate—an existing business based in the NWT.
2. Employer-Driven Stream: This stream, delivered by the Department of Education, Culture and Employment, is for employers who wish to hire and nominate foreign nationals when there are no Canadians or Canadian Permanent Residents available. Workers—who must have a job offer from an employer in the NWT—may achieve Permanent Residency through 3 categories in this stream:
  1. Entry Level/Semi-Skilled Occupations
  2. Skilled Worker
  3. NWT Express Entry

== Ontario Immigrant Nominee Program ==
The Ontario Immigrant Nominee Program (OINP) provides opportunities for foreign workers, international students, business owners, and entrepreneurs to apply for permanent residency in Ontario, as well as enabling Ontario businesses to recruit international talent. It is facilitated by the provincial government's Ministry of Labour, Training and Skills Development, and is regulated by: Ontario Immigration Act, 2015, Ontario Regulation 421/17, and Ontario Regulation 422/17.

The OINP offers 3 categories for people to qualify for a nomination:

1. Employer job offer: This category is for workers who already have a full-time permanent job offer from an Ontario employer. There are 3 streams for this category
  - Foreign Worker: workers in skilled positions
  - International Student: recent graduates in Ontario
  - In-Demand Skills: intermediate skilled workers in specific sectors, such as agriculture, construction, trucking, and personal support workers
2. Human capital: This category includes 2 subcategories, each with their own streams.
  1. International graduates: This subcategory is for the Masters Graduate or PhD Graduate streams, wherein applicants must have a graduate degree from an eligible Ontario university and apply within 2 years of getting that degree.
  2. Ontario's Express Entry: This subcategory is for those who have received a notification of interest from Ontario and have an up-to-date profile with their most current work experience, language tests and education in the federal government's Express Entry system. There are 3 streams in this category:
    - French-Speaking Skilled Worker: French-Speaking skilled workers who have the required work experience, education, and language proficiency in French and English.
    - Human Capital Priorities: Skilled workers who have the required work experience, education, and language proficiency in French or English
    - Skilled Trades: Workers who have work experience in Ontario in an eligible trade occupation.
3. Business: This category is for entrepreneurs seeking to open a new business or buy an existing business in Ontario. This category only has one stream: Entrepreneur.

== Saskatchewan Immigrant Nominee Program ==
The Saskatchewan Immigrant Nominee Program (SINP) has 4 categories for immigrating to Saskatchewan:

1. International Skilled Worker
2. Worker with Saskatchewan Work Experience
3. Entrepreneur
4. Farm Owner and Operator
5. Lodge owner and operator

== Yukon Nominee Program ==
The Yukon Nominee Program (YNP) is an economic-based immigration program for the Yukon, administered by the territorial government’s Department of Economic Development (Immigration Unit) in partnership with IRCC under the Agreement for Canada-Yukon Co-operation on Immigration.

The YNP offers three streams for foreign workers:

- Yukon Express Entry
- Skilled Worker
- Critical Impact Worker
