= Immigrant benefits urban legend =

Conspiracy theory originating in Canada

An urban legend falsely stating that government-sponsored refugees receive more monetary support from the government than a country's own pensioners originated in Canada in 2004 and has since spread to other countries, including the United Kingdom, the United States, and Australia.

== Canada ==
=== Origin ===
This urban myth has its origins in a 2004 Toronto Star article. On 11 March 2004, the Toronto Star published an article about the resettlement of a group of refugees from Somalia to Hamilton, Ontario. The article focused on the Canadian government's new strategy to divert immigrant and refugee settlement away from the most popular destinations of Montreal, Toronto, and Vancouver. The article also described the support that the Somalian refugees would receive from the Government of Canada:

A single person receives $1,890 from the federal government as start-up allowance, along with $580 monthly social assistance, depending on how soon the person is able to find employment. They also each receive a night lamp, table, a chair and a single bed from the government.

On March 12, the day following the publication of the article, Nicholas Keung, the reporter who wrote the original article, received a "polemic" e-mail from a reader. The author of the e-mail mistakenly concluded that refugees receive a monthly allowance from the federal government greater than the monthly allowance received by pensioners. This e-mail was also copied to 100 other recipients. When the reporter tried to respond to the e-mail to correct the mistake, he found that the address no longer existed.

On the same day, in response to Keung's article, Toronto Star published a letter to the editor without fact checking or revisiting the original article for clarification. The letter stated:

I think the effort to resettle refugees in smaller communities is an excellent effort. These refugees may find it easier to integrate into a smaller community especially if accompanied by some of their compatriots. I also find it interesting that the federal government provides a single refugee with a monthly allowance of $1,890 and each can also get an additional $580 in social assistance for a total of $2,470. This compares very well to a single pensioner who after contributing to the growth and development of Canada for 40 years can only receive a monthly maximum of $1,012 in old age pension and Guaranteed Income Supplement. Maybe our pensioners should apply as refugees?

Following the publication of the letter and the distribution of the forwarded e-mail, the Toronto Star was bombarded with e-mails from readers who felt that something should be done to ensure that pensioners received their fair due by the government. After investigating the matter and realizing that a mistake had been made, the ombudsman of the paper published an article on 27 November 2004 correcting the conclusion that refugees received more than pensioners. "In hindsight, the ombud now wishes he'd issued a speedy clarification to help set the record straight," he wrote. "But with information (and misinformation) moving at a warp speed on the Internet, I doubt there was a silver bullet for the problem."

This apology and correction of the mistake had little impact on the circulation of the newly born urban myth. The same letter to the editor appeared with minor alterations in over 50 newspapers, online newsletters, blogs, and discussion forums in the next 3 years. Six newspapers printed the same letter with slight alterations more than once on different dates and from different authors.

=== Government response ===
In November 2006, Citizenship and Immigration Canada (CIC) published an online fact sheet on the issue in order to try to counter the spread of the false information. CIC dismissed the rumor, stating:

Refugees don't receive more financial assistance from the federal government than Canadian pensioners. A letter to the editor of a Canadian newspaper contained this incorrect information. In it, a one-time, start-up payment provided to some refugees in Canada was mistaken for an ongoing, monthly payment. Unfortunately, although the newspaper published a clarification, the misleading information had already spread widely over e-mail and the internet.

== Outside of Canada ==
The letter has continued to appear on the Internet and the original email has been altered in some cases, replacing the Canadian context with an American one. Many American conservative politicians and commentators, however, have embraced this urban legend in a general sense.

In 2012, a UK version of the letter started circulating on Facebook, in the form of an open letter to "Prime Minister the RT HON. David Cameron MP".

=== Australia ===
In 2008, the ABC program Media Watch documented several appearances of the urban legend in Australia's mainstream media, beginning with The Cairns Post which published letters to the editor containing the claims, and using the same figures as the original Canadian email, in August 2007 and February 2008. Despite the Media Watch story, the same letters appeared two months later in The Courier-Mail in Brisbane and The West Australian in Perth. On 21 April 2008, 2GB talkback radio host Alan Jones read the email on air, and was critical of Media Watch when the program contacted him to advise him of the hoax.

The Australian government's Department of Immigration and Citizenship responded to a letter in the Sunraysia Daily, drawing attention to the email's Canadian origins, and stating that benefits paid to refugees were on the same basis and at the same rate as those to any Australian resident.

== See also ==
- Immigration to Canada
- Economic impact of immigration to Canada
- Welfare chauvinism
