= Points-based immigration system =

Migration and entry system

A points-based immigration system or merit-based immigration system is an immigration system where a noncitizen's eligibility to immigrate is (partly or wholly) determined by whether that noncitizen is able to score above a threshold number of points in a scoring system that might include such factors as education level, wealth, connection with the country, language fluency, existing job offer, or others.

Countries that use points-based immigration systems may have other pathways for potential immigrants (such as immediate family, refugees, etc.), so that meeting the points threshold is not necessary for all immigrants. They may also have additional criteria that points-based immigrants need to satisfy, such as no criminal record or no involvement with terrorist organizations. Some countries that use points-based immigration systems are the United Kingdom (see main article), Canada, Australia, New Zealand, Singapore and Germany. Canada and Australia are the two countries with the most experience with the points-based system, and are often used as the comparison points when judging whether a country's immigration system is points-based.

== Points-based systems by country ==
=== Canada ===
Canada was the first country to introduce a points-based immigration system, doing so in 1967. The change came as Canada was moving past an immigration system that distinguished based on race and country of origin. The new system favoured youth, education, experience and fluency in English or French, i.e., broad human capital as opposed to a specific job offer or job-specific skills. The points-based immigration system has been identified as one of the factors in the change in Canada's immigrant distribution from 85% European to 15% European and levelled the field of immigration.The minimum points necessary to enter the country is 67 points, however, the number of points vary among countries. More efficient immigration and hiring is done because of this system.There is some evidence that immigrants entering under the points system have experienced better outcomes in Canada. In response to lower and declining labour force participation among people admitted through the points-based system relative to native Canadian workers, two reasons were identified: lack of recognition by Canadian employers of foreign educational degrees, and poor language fluency. As a result, the government changed its points-based system to weigh English and French language fluency more heavily. The system was also changed so that any skilled applicant with a job offer scores higher than any applicant without. The application process was again revamped due to the gap between a foreign candidate and an employer and reduced the points for job offer, they also changed the system to an invitation to immigrate method that allows an open expression of interest with the option the pool of candidates can remain a year or two in the system to meet the frequently published "lottery point" and get invited. The lack of visibility of qualified immigrant candidate profiles in the job bank for the employers and hiring agencies in reaching out with a job offer was observed to lag the process.

The last major change to Canada's points-based system took place in January 2015 upon the federal government's launch of Express Entry. Up until Express Entry's introduction, Canada struggled to manage its intake of applications since it received more applications than its available immigration spots. The backlogs were due to Canada processing applications in the order in which they received. In other words, Canada reviewed each application, which was a time-consuming process. Canada formally moved away from this approach when it launched Express Entry. Express Entry is a more dynamic application management system, since it enables the Canadian government to only process the applications of the highest-scoring candidates. This system has eliminated backlogs and reduced the application processing standard to six months or less.

=== Australia ===
In 1972, the Labor Government elected in Australia decided migrants would be granted a visa based on personal attributes and ability to contribute to Australian society. In 1989, Australia formalized a points-based immigration system similar to Canada's (The Economist gives a date of 1979 for initial rollout of the policy). Like Canada, Australia switched to the points-based system as it was transitioning out of its history of race-based (Briton-focused, white-only) immigration policy. Australia's experience of the system is unique with smaller changes in regulations and diverse options through provincial programs. Australia shifted to an application process where people were invited to express interest if they meet a required-straight forward score and the applicants would be invited per labour market requirements within a year or two after being in the pool.

In 2017, Australia's points-based system was cited as an inspiration and was raised as an elegant point during discussions of immigration policy in the United Kingdom in the context of Brexit. It has also been cited in the context of Donald Trump's interest in making the United States immigration system more merit-based and reducing its focus on extended family migration after the Australian prime minister Malcolm Turnbull announced putting "Australians first" through a Facebook video.

=== New Zealand ===
Prior to 1987 New Zealand almost entirely focused immigration on ethnicity. A rudimentary system of skills based immigration was legislated for in 1987 and a simplified points system came into being later in 1991.

=== Singapore ===
In 2022, the Singaporean government announced a points-based immigration system for skilled applicants who wish to work and live in Singapore. Known as the Complementarity Assessment Framework (COMPASS), it was put into effect from September 2023 for foreigners intending to work in Singapore under an Employment Pass (EP).

=== United Kingdom ===
Between 2008 and 2010, the United Kingdom phased in a points-based immigration system for regulating immigration from outside the European Economic Area. The Economist reports that the system did not evolve into a points-based system like that of Australia or Canada due to the numerous special exemptions carved out by various interest groups, and subsequent slashing of immigration under the Tory government. However, specialty based immigration is open in the United Kingdom. Upon exiting the European Union in 2021, the UK implemented a single points based immigration system for all applicants.

=== Germany ===
In 2023, the German government approved a points-based immigration system to be implemented in stages by 2024.

== Initial assumptions of points-based systems ==
=== Job offers and language fluency ===
Both Canada and Australia began with points-based systems focused more on human capital than on specific job offers, but both found through experience that this resulted in lower immigrant employment rates compared with natives or with immigrants in certain states and provinces. This led Madeleine Sumption of the Migration Observatory at Oxford University to claim that "pure" point systems "don't work." Both countries modified their points-based systems to take job offers into account. This did not open window for job opportunities or an open channel for immigrant candidates and employers; additional paperwork and lack of channels have been observed resulting in low rates of immigration and many have reverted or reduced points required in these factors.

=== Frequency of adjustment ===
Demetrios Papademetriou of the Migration Policy Institute argued, based on the frequent tweaking of criteria used by Canada and Australia, that points-based systems require frequent tweaking in order to be successful. Given the slow pace of United States immigration legislation, he argued that this required a greater level of planning for the bureaucracy than seen in the United States immigration system, so to gain autonomy for the implementation of a points-based system would be a challenge for the United States.

== Proposals in the United States ==
The Border Security, Economic Opportunity, and Immigration Modernization Act of 2013, which passed the U.S. Senate but not the House of Representatives, would have instituted a points-based immigration system.

=== RAISE Act ===
In the United States, President Donald Trump and his first administration, as well as some Republicans, supported the RAISE Act, which proposed legislation to steeply cut legal immigration to the United States. In addition to substantially reducing legal immigration to the United States, and reducing family-based immigration, the bill would also replace the current employment-based U.S. visa with a points system, as exists in some other democracies like Australia and Canada. Under the legislation, a maximum of 140,000 points-based immigrant visas would be issued per fiscal year, with spouses and minor children of the principal applicant being counted against the 140,000 cap. The legislation would eliminate the current demand-driven, employer-led model, in which employment-based visas are directly responsive to the needs of the labour market, and would move to a model in which potential migrants would be primarily valued by human capital factors. The points system proposed in the act would prioritize "individuals who are already U.S.-educated, trained in STEM fields, highly-compensated, English-fluent, and young" while disadvantaging "women, people who work in the informal economy (including those who do unpaid work), individuals with family ties to U.S. citizens but without formal education and employment history, middle-aged and older adults, and applicants from less-developed countries."
