= Canadianization movement =

Political movement in Canadian academia

Canadianization or the Canadianization movement refers partly to a campaign launched in Carleton University in Ottawa, Canada, in 1968 by Robin Mathews and James Steele. The purpose of the campaign was to ensure that Carleton, as an employer, treated Canadian citizens equitably and that Canadians would remain or become at least a two-thirds majority of the teaching staff. Although Carleton was the particular institution addressed in the recommendations of Mathews and Steele, they were concerned about fairness for Canadian scholars in the hiring practices of all Canadian universities and about a lack of Canadian content in many courses.

Although their recommendations were rejected at Carleton, concern about Canadianization was widespread. Eventually, all universities in Canada were required by the Canadian government to follow employment practices that were more fair for Canadians, and the number and percentage of courses with Canadian content in Canadian universities increased remarkably.

The problem of Canadianization was the subject of a three-volume report prepared by the Commission on Canadian Studies chaired by Professor T.H.B. Symons (formerly President of Trent University). Between 1960 and 1980, many other cultural organizations "Canadianized" in one way or another. The movement has remained a subject of discussion in recent years, and the term "Canadianization" has been applied, often retrospectively, to analogous or similar movements.

== The meeting at Carleton and five motions ==
"Canadianization" or the "Canadianization Movement" began when two Carleton professors circulated recommendations in a memorandum addressed to all members of the Carleton University Academic Staff Association (C.U.A.S.A.). This document noted there was strong evidence that Canadian citizens were becoming a rapidly diminishing proportion of the faculties of arts and science in Canadian Universities and requested a meeting of C.U.A.S.A. to discuss five remedial motions. Mathews and Steele first asked the university to ensure that, in hiring new professors, Canadian citizens would eventually form a two-thirds majority of faculty. Because this motion had no time limit, its recommendation was for a goal not a quota. The second motion recommended that, before the appointment of a non-Canadian, a vacancy be well advertised in Canada. The other three asked that Canadian citizenship be made a necessary qualification for all future appointments to administrative positions, that Carleton keep a record of the citizenship of faculty, and that the Canadian Association of University Teachers (C.A.U.T.) gather information about the citizenship-composition of Canadian universities and "consider the formulation of a national policy with respect to this matter." Adoption of these measures was intended to assure the place of Canadians as faculty members at Carleton University.

=== Reasons for the motions ===
Mathews and Steele argued that during the decade of the 1960s, Canadians had become an ever smaller proportion of faculty in Canadian universities. In 1961, census data indicated that the proportion of Canadians on faculty was about 75%. By 1967–68, there were strong indications that the proportion of Canadians in faculties of arts and science in some 15 universities had fallen to 49%. They noted in their Memorandum and in a later introductory chapter to their book that this decline in the proportion of Canadians had occurred in a national context of conditions that threatened Canada's sovereignty. Canada's status as a branch-plant economy had been described in the report of the Task Force on Foreign Ownership and the Structure of Canadian Investment headed by Professor Mel Watkins. Senator Grattan O'Leary had described the extent to which Canadian communication media had become inundated with American content. The two professors argued that the national allegiances of faculty members could affect scholarly priorities—a matter subsequently well discussed in relation to Political Science by two students at York University and the University of Toronto, James MacKinnon and David Brown. In later statements, Mathews and Steele observed that Canadian materials were often neglected in university departments employing few Canadian faculty.

They likewise explained that many university positions in Canada were being filled without advertising in Canada. Instead, informal networks were frequently used to recruit scholars from outside the country. Yet Canadians were often prevented from competing in those same foreign jurisdictions because of exclusionary regulations and practices favoring the nationals of those countries. The two professors argued that their motions would help to level the playing field while providing ample space for the hiring of foreign applicants. They suggested that, if hiring practices were fair for Canadians, Canadian candidates would often be successful.

Mathews and Steele recommended that university administrators be citizens of Canada for two reasons. This qualification would help to ensure that administrators, who are concerned with the logistics of scholarship, would be familiar with the needs and aspirations of the Canadian community. It would also guarantee that when administrators exercise regulatory, judicial, financial, and disciplinary powers they would have the civil qualification of at least a voter. Steele observed that making this civil status a requirement would also be in accordance with a recommendation of a former Ontario Chief Justice, James Chalmers McRuer.

== Reception of the motions at Carleton ==
The memorandum and motions presented by the two men were greeted with general hostility at the C.U.A.S.A. meeting. Many colleagues argued that because scholarship, science, and learning are international and because some members of faculty were non-Canadian, the motions were anti-academic and offensive. The two proponents were accordingly described as racist, anti-American, immoral, and more. One colleague even attempted to present a motion to refer Mathews and Steele to the Ontario Human Rights Commission with the suggestion they should be criminally charged. Yet two of the few people who supported the motions were non-Canadians who understood the problem being addressed. The meeting ended with a vote to change and amend the recommendations in order to destroy their intention. The original motions were defeated by votes of 135 to five and even, in one case, by 138 to 2.

=== Concern elsewhere ===
It later became evident that scholars in Canada in disciplines ranging from Chemistry to History to Zoology were concerned about the Canadianization problem but had not expressed their thoughts publicly. At Carleton, the proposals were strongly supported by Professor Antonio Gualtieri, a member of Carleton's Department of Religion. Even before the Carleton meeting, Professor Anthony Raspa discussed the problem publicly in Le Devoir. The negative response he elicited from colleagues was an early indication of the strong emotions it could arouse. Raspa, then a member of the English Department of Loyola College (now part of Concordia), had to contend with one "violent" colleague, with several others who signed a petition stating he "imperil[ed] the reputation of the College," with a chair who asked the college senate to investigate and possibly censure him, and with a President who informed him by letter—later retracted—that his teaching contract would not be renewed. Between 1969 and 1972, Mathews and/or Steele spoke widely on the subject of Canadianization at teach-ins and/or special meetings, participating as guest speakers, individually or together, at many universities and colleges and occasionally at teacher conventions. (Institutions where they spoke included the following: the University of Victoria, the University of British Columbia, Simon Fraser University, Calgary University, the University of Alberta, the University of Saskatchewan, the University of Manitoba, the University of Toronto, York University, Queen's University, Seneca College, the Ontario Institute for Studies in Education, McGill University, Bishop's University, Dawson College, Marianopolis College, Sir George Williams University, the University of New Brunswick, Mount Allison University, Dalhousie University, and Memorial University.) They also did radio, television, and print media interviews across the country so that the public could become aware of the problem.

In addition to these public communications, Mathews corresponded privately with members of nearly all the institutions mentioned above as well as with members of a dozen other colleges and/or organizations. His correspondents included students, faculty members, chairs, and presidents; and his letters were about hiring practices and/or curricular matters. Many scholars wrote to Mathews and Steele requesting detailed information about the meeting at Carleton. Others, in letters and other publications, described a lack of employment opportunities for Canadians and lamented a lack of interest in Canadian matters in certain departments. After Mathews and Steele received so many requests for the information that the correspondence was becoming unmanageable, they edited The Struggle for Canadian Universities: A Dossier. As well as being a record of events at Carleton, it included a selection of correspondence and many related publications. In the age of the mimeograph machine, the purpose of the book was to meet numerous requests for information and to facilitate a process of reform.

== Changes in hiring practices and curriculum ==
As news of the Carleton meeting was widely reported and hotly debated outside of academia, attention to the issue bore fruit. The federal department called Employment and Immigration Canada—then referred to as the Department of Manpower and Immigration—introduced rules to ensure fairer procedures in the hiring practices of Canadian universities. In 1977, it made the advertising of all vacancies mandatory, and in 1981 it stipulated that a search for Canadian applicants would be necessary before it would approve a job offer to a foreign candidate.

In 1969, the Canadian Association of University Teachers (C.A.U.T.) also published a position paper "'Canadianization' and the University" drafted by its Executive and Finance Committee. It re-affirmed the support of the C.A.U.T. for the advertising of all academic vacancies while asserting that "competence" should be the principal criterion in employing both Canadian and foreign scholars. In 1977, the C.A.U.T. published a revised "Guidelines on Canadianization and the University"—a policy statement recommending again that all vacancies be advertised and that "the appointment of a person who is not a Canadian or legally a resident of Canada should be justified to the satisfaction of a university or faculty committee." Such appointment-review committees—one in each institution—should likewise ensure (i)that Canadian citizens and landed immigrants are treated equally,(ii) that job descriptions are clearly stated (and not worded so as to place Canadians at an unfair disadvantage)and(iii)that an "active search" for a qualified Canadian for each position has been made.

As these changes in hiring procedures were being considered or introduced, "Canadianization" came to include more than a concern about hiring. It drew attention to the serious neglect of Canadian materials and courses across the Canadian university community and, of course, to the lack of materials (and knowledge about existing materials) available in libraries and archives. It came to include demands for a greater range and depth of course offerings that engage research and subject matter relating to Canada. For instance, Professor J. Laurence Black observed that in 1969 Laurentian University's Political Science department offered only a half course in Canadian government, its Geography department offered no courses in Canadian geography, and its English department offered none in Canadian literature. Professor R. L MacDougall noted that in the early 1970s, "undergraduate courses in Canadian literature represented only 8% of the total offerings of departments of English." Courses in Quebec literature were also hard to find even in Quebec.

Between 1970 and 1980, through the work of scholars across the country and pressure from concerned students active in campus radio, campus newspapers, and student organizations, the Canadian content of Canadian university courses increased significantly. In 2006, when Steele and Mathews surveyed the calendar descriptions of courses in five disciplines at six universities for the years 1970, 1975, and 1980, they found that by 1975 the number of courses listing Canadian content had increased by 73% and that such courses had more than doubled by 1980. Responding to the wide-ranging debate and the growing concern over the inadequate study of Canadian matters in many disciplines, the Association of Universities and Colleges of Canada (AUCC)--an organization of university executive heads representing their respective institutions—decided to consider the question of Canadian resources for treating Canadian material.

== The Commission on Canadian Studies ==
With an expectation of funding by the Canada Council, the AUCC decided in 1970 or even earlier to establish a Commission on Canadian Studies. In June, 1972, the AUCC appointed Professor T.H.B. Symons to serve as chair. The commission was staffed with a research coordinator, four research associates, 10 research assistants, three consultants, and an advisory panel of 35. It held more than 40 hearings across the country, received "more than 1000 briefs and close to 40,000 letters." It also had some 58 liaison persons in almost as many universities across the country. In 1976, the AUCC released the first two volumes of the commission's report: To Know Ourselves: Report of the Commission on Canadian Studies or the Symons Report (as it is better known). It describes university hiring practices, analyzes the Canadian content in the courses of many different disciplines, and describes the state of "Canadian Studies" both within Canada and abroad. It also makes more than a 1000 recommendations for the addition of more Canadian content in teaching and research. It says little, however, about the responsibilities of university administrators or about their citizenship.

The first two volumes of the Symons Report were also published in a shorter version two years later. In 1981, James E. Page, a consultant to the commission, wrote Reflections on the Symons Report The State of Canadian Studies: A Report Prepared for The Department of Secretary of State of Canada. In 1984, the Commission on Canadian Studies published a study by Professor Symons and James E. Page. This third volume of the Symons Report, entitled Some Questions of Balance: Human Resources, Higher Education and Canadian Studies, makes a plea—still unanswered—for "the collection of adequate statistical information about Canadian postsecondary education and about current and future requirements for highly qualified personnel." The authors also discuss, among other topics, the historical context of Canadianization and the matter of citizenship. With respect to the latter, their recommendations include an endorsement of a later version of the C.A.U.T.'s "Guidelines on Canadianization and the University" (1977) (see section E above). They note, however, that neither university administrations nor faculty associations have given much support to these Guidelines in practice. By 1984 "only one or two of the seventy Canadian universities and degree-granting institutions" had followed the C.A.U.T.'s second recommendation and established an appointments review committee which would monitor the wording of job descriptions for fairness to Canadians and ascertain whether or not the "appointment of a person who is not a Canadian or legally a resident of Canada" was justified. Although Symons and Page observe that university administrators had not adopted these reasonable employment practices, the third volume of their Report, like the first two, includes little discussion of this matter.

After the Commission on Canadian Studies ended its work, Professor Symons transmitted its copious fonds to the archives of Trent University Library where they now occupy some 19 metres of shelf space in 73 boxes (see the list of Archival Sources below).

== Related developments ==
The support of organizations outside the universities also helped to keep the debate alive and to keep public interest focused on the need for change. Help came from such associations as the Committee for an Independent Canada, the Confederation of Canadian Unions, The Waffle (within the New Democratic Party), and from some other MPs in the House of Commons. The Progressive Conservative Robert Stanfield, Leader of the Opposition, asked a question about the subject in Question Period on April 24, 1969 and soon thereafter discussed the problem at length in a speech to an Ottawa Rotary Club. On May 29, Mr. Mark Rose of the New Democratic Party spoke at length about matter in the House of Commons and the Liberal government's Lloyd Axworthy, as responsible minister, put in place the regulations (as mentioned above) to assure a consistent policy of fairness to Canadian applicants for academic positions (see Part E).

The years before 1968 had seen a growing concern with foreign participation in, especially, the economy of Canada and also with the state of Canadian social and cultural life. The famous Walter Gordon federal budget of 1963 (quickly withdrawn) sought to repatriate Canadian ownership of the economy and engendered an intense national debate and, ultimately, in 1968 the Watkins Report on foreign ownership. The 1957 creation of the Canada Council for the Arts encouraged increased cultural activity, and so did the formation of provincial councils of the arts. Celebration of the Canadian Centennial in 1967 focused popular attention on the country and its achievements. A. Birnie Hodgetts had written What Culture?: What Heritage? A Study of Civic Education in Canada; the Report of the National History Project.

Attention to Canadian sovereignty in all dimensions of Canadian life sharpened in the 1960s and continued after them. Concern with "Canadianization" was not confined to education and educational opportunities. A wide range of organizations concerned with Canadianization were formed. These included the Writers' Union of Canada, the National Farmers Union, the Confederation of Canadian Unions, the League of Canadian Poets, the Canadian Artists' Representation/Le Front des artistes canadiens (CARFAC), and the National Action Committee on the Status of Women (NAC), the Canadian Centre for Policy Alternatives, the Canadian Liberation Movement ... and more.

During the 1970s, interest in Canadianization was also spurred by the Cold War, then at its height. Canadians were aware that this conflict could have easily escalated, either by design or accident, into a nuclear war, which could have been a devastating, transpolar conflict fought mainly in Canadian skies. In this context, knowledge relating to Canada had a bearing on both personal and national survival. Many Canadians were concerned, for example, when contradictory answers to a question in theoretical physics—about whether or not the Bomarc missiles stationed at North Bay in Northern Ontario, if armed with nuclear warheads, could successfully "cook" the incoming warheads of hostile missiles—were given along national lines.

== Later discussion of Canadianization ==
Canadianization has remained a subject of both discussion and controversy, even while Canadian universities remain the most international in the world. In 1996, historian J.L. Granatstein describes the movement and its rationale in Yankee Go Home?: Canadians and Anti-Americanism. Jeffrey Cormier, a sociologist, analyses the campaign in a book-length study, The Canadianization Movement: Emergence, Survival, and Success (2004)--a work also concerned with the movement as it related to changing conditions of employment in Cormier's own discipline of Sociology. Cormier takes a wider view of the campaign in "The Canadianization Movement in Context" (2005). Cormier takes a wider view of the campaign in "The Canadianization Movement in Context" (2005). Steele and Mathews respond with "Canadianization Revisited: A Comment on Cormier's "The Canadianization Movement in Context" (2006), where they discuss certain factual errors, Cormier's view of "context," and his description of the actors involved. Dirk Hoerder, in From the Study of Canada to Canadian Studies: To Know Our Many Selves Changing Across Space and Time(2005), traces the history of Canadian studies from the early nineteenth century to modern times in an analysis written from a post-national and "transcultural" point of view. In 2006, Professor Li Wei analyses the movement for a Chinese readership in "The Canadianization Movement and Its Influence on the Higher Education System of Canada." Ryan Edwardson comments on the movement in the context of the Massey Report, multiculturalism, and many other related cultural policies in Canadian Content: Culture and the Quest for Nationhood (2008). Brooke Anderson argues in "The elephant in the (class)room: The debate over Americanization of Canadian universities and the question of national identity" (2011) that "neo-colonialism" was an idea shared by the movement's proponents and opponents alike.

== Archival sources and materials ==
- Canadianization Movement Papers: 1965–1985. King's University College, University of Western Ontario. A collection deposited by Jeffrey Cormier.
- CAUT/ACPPU Papers. Library and Archives Canada: MG28 I 208 127. A collection deposited by the CAUT/ACPPU.
- Commission on Canadian Studies fonds—1970-1986–19m of textual records. Trent University Archives. A collection deposited by the Commission on Canadian Studies, 86-031.
- Robin Mathews Papers. Library and Archives Canada: MG31 D 190 [Vols/Boxes] 18–35. A collection deposited by Robin Mathews.
