= Express Entry =

Canadian immigration management system

Express Entry (French: Entrée express) is a system used by the Canadian government to manage Canadian permanent residence applications for filling labour gaps through certain economic immigration programs. Launched on 1 January 2015, this immigration system is used to select and communicate with skilled and qualified applicants, it also manages a pool of immigration ready skilled workers. Express Entry is designed to facilitate express immigration of skilled workers to Canada "who are most likely to succeed economically." The system is identified to be efficient in processing times, with 80% of applications processed in 6 months or less compared to an existing one.

Those who are eligible for one of the programs managed by Express Entry submit their application and the Canadian government issues invitation letters to successful candidates per a score system. Acceptance of the invitation and positive assessment of the Immigration, Refugees and Citizenship Canada on the application will grant the applicant, and their accompanying family members, Canadian permanent resident status. The application process involves several steps, including creating an online profile, receiving an invitation to apply if eligible, and submitting a complete application with supporting documents.

== Economic value versus "first-come first-served" ==
Express Entry replaced the original "first-come first-served" immigration selection system. Express Entry was expected to be more responsive to regional labour shortages. It systemically favours qualified immigrants by prioritising such individuals and avoids the arbitrary selections of the previous system which, in some cases, were based on a first-come, first-served basis.

Express Entry uses a points-based system, called the Comprehensive Ranking System (CRS), to automatically rank interested candidates and select the most competitive for immigration. The core factors considered are age, level of education, language proficiency in English and/or French, and Canadian work experience. An ideal candidate would be between the age of 20–29, possessing a high level of education, and advanced proficiency in either English or French.

Concerns have also been expressed about the Express Entry system. Morton Beiser and Harald Bauder (2014) of Ryerson University wrote "Canada's once pathbreaking immigration policies are being transformed into a system that mainly serves employers, treating immigrants not as future citizens or members of Canadian communities and families but merely as convenient or cheap labour." Others fear that Express Entry gives too much power to politicians and bureaucrats. Advocates of Express Entry claim that it can reduce the number of migrants who fail to get work by better fitting immigrants to existing jobs vacancies.

== The system ==
The Canadian government establishes its own annual quota for new immigrants. Under its 2020-2022 Immigration Levels Plan, Canada is targeting the arrival of 91,800 immigrants through Express Entry in 2020. It has set a target of an additional 91,150 arrivals in 2021, and 91,150 in 2022.

At its discretion, the Canadian government conducts an Express Entry draw, inviting the most competitive Express Entry candidates to apply for Canadian permanent resident status. In these draws, the federal government establishes a cut-off score, using the Comprehensive Ranking System. All candidates with scores higher than the cut-off will receive an official Invitation to Apply (ITA) for permanent residency. The lowest CRS score ever recorded for The Federal Skilled Trades Class was 199 in May 2017. In 2020, the lowest CRS score for applicants was 415 out of 1,200. If multiple applicants have the same CRS score, the system sorts the applications by the date and time the applicant's profile was submitted to the system. The government may limit the draws to specific Express Entry immigration programs. This has become frequent since June 2023 when the Canadian government introduced Category-based selection.

IRCC announced that Express Entry invitation rounds would temporarily pause from 3 November 2026 while CRS scores in existing profiles were recalculated. The recalculation could take up to two weeks, with invitation rounds resuming once it was complete.

In 2019, the Canadian government issued 85,300 ITAs. Some 45% of these ITAs were issued to Federal Skilled Worker Program (FSWP) candidates, 36% went to Canadian Experience Class (CEC) candidates, 18% went to Provincial Nominee Program (PNP) candidates, and 1% went to Federal Skilled Trades Program (FSTP) candidates.

In 2020, 107,350 further ITAs were issued to Express Entry candidates.

All applications are processed under the Immigration and Refugee Protection Act (IRPA) and go through the following stages:

1. Completeness Check - At the completeness check, the processing office determines only whether the required documents are included. This stage is also called R10 which refers to section 10 of the Immigration and Refugee Protection Regulations.
2. Review of eligibility - Review of whether the applicant meets the eligibility requirement. This stage is also referred to A11.2 which refers to Section 11.2 of IRPA. In this stage an immigration officer will study the documents submitted with the application to determine if they corroborate the assertions the candidate made to be issued an Invitation to Apply.
3. Review of medical results - This stage is processed in accordance with section 29 (R29) of the Immigration and Refugee Protection Regulations.
4. Review of additional documents - The applicant will be contacted if additional documents are required
5. Interview - The applicant will be contacted if an interview is required.
6. Biometrics (or Criminality Check) - Specifically fingerprints, is used to establish the identity of applicants at the time of an application and as a program integrity tool.
7. Background check (or Security Check) - A procedure to verify the criminal and/or security background of visa applicants to ensure they're admissible to Canada.
8. Final decision
