= Canada immigration statistics =

Historic and contemporary immigration statistics of Canada by census year

Decadal and demi-decadal census reports in Canada have compiled detailed immigration statistics prior to confederation in 1867 through to the contemporary era. During this period, the highest share of immigrants in Canada was recorded during the 1851 census, when 535,153 total immigrants accounted for 26.3 percent of the total population, (Note: Province of Canada territory (Upper Canada & Lower Canada) and New Brunswick.) while the largest number of immigrants in Canada was recorded during the 2021 census, when 8,361,505 total immigrants accounted for 23.0 percent of the total population.

Following initial British and French colonization, what is now Canada has seen five major waves (or peaks) of immigration and settlement of non-Indigenous Peoples take place over a span of nearly two centuries.

== Background ==
Canada receives its immigrant population from almost every country in the world. Statistics Canada projects that immigrants will represent between 29.1% and 34.0% of Canada's population in 2041, compared with 23.0% in 2021, while the Canadian population with at least one foreign born parent (first and second generation persons) could rise to between 49.8% and 54.3%, up from 44.0% in 2021. Between 2010 and 2031, the visible minority population will likely double.

Immigrants to Canada by place of birth (1841–2021)
Year	Total immigrants		Ireland		United Kingdom		United States		Continental Europe		Asia		Caribbean		Africa		Central & South America		Oceania		Other/Unspecified	
Year	Pop.	%	Pop.	%	Pop.	%	Pop.	%	Pop.	%	Pop.	%	Pop.	%	Pop.	%	Pop.	%	Pop.	%	Pop.	%
1841	312,599	26.4%	122,237	39.1%	105,753	33.83%	44,755	14.32%	6,581	2.11%	—N/a	—N/a	—N/a	—N/a	—N/a	—N/a	—N/a	—N/a	—N/a	—N/a	33,273	10.64%
1851	535,153	26.28%	256,238	47.88%	193,067	36.08%	56,214	10.5%	11,830	2.21%	—N/a	—N/a	—N/a	—N/a	—N/a	—N/a	—N/a	—N/a	—N/a	—N/a	17,804	3.33%
1861	677,967	21.94%	281,060	41.46%	269,058	39.69%	66,356	9.79%	28,353	4.18%	—N/a	—N/a	—N/a	—N/a	—N/a	—N/a	—N/a	—N/a	—N/a	—N/a	33,140	4.89%
1871	593,403	17.02%	219,451	36.98%	266,925	44.98%	64,447	10.86%	28,690	4.83%	—N/a	—N/a	—N/a	—N/a	—N/a	—N/a	—N/a	—N/a	—N/a	—N/a	13,890	2.34%
1881	609,318	14.09%	185,526	30.45%	285,380	46.84%	77,753	12.76%	39,161	6.43%	—N/a	—N/a	—N/a	—N/a	—N/a	—N/a	—N/a	—N/a	—N/a	—N/a	21,498	3.53%
1891	647,362	13.39%	149,184	23.04%	328,551	50.75%	80,915	12.5%	53,841	8.32%	9,129	1.41%	—N/a	—N/a	—N/a	—N/a	—N/a	—N/a	—N/a	—N/a	25,742	3.98%
1901	699,500	13.02%	101,629	14.53%	288,390	41.23%	127,899	18.28%	125,549	17.95%	24,560	3.51%	699	0.1%	128	0.02%	—N/a	—N/a	1,365	0.2%	29,281	4.19%
1911	1,586,961	22.02%	92,874	5.85%	711,360	44.83%	303,680	19.14%	404,941	25.52%	45,437	2.86%	2,089	0.13%	1,389	0.09%	—N/a	—N/a	3,558	0.22%	21,633	1.36%
1921	1,955,736	22.25%	93,301	4.77%	931,820	47.65%	374,024	19.12%	459,328	23.49%	57,484	2.94%	4,393	0.22%	1,760	0.09%	—N/a	—N/a	3,940	0.2%	29,686	1.52%
1931	2,307,525	22.24%	107,544	4.66%	1,031,398	44.7%	344,574	14.93%	714,462	30.96%	65,280	2.83%	4,537	0.2%	2,235	0.1%	1,296	0.06%	4,999	0.22%	31,200	1.35%
1941	2,018,847	17.55%	86,126	4.27%	873,999	43.29%	312,473	15.48%	653,705	32.38%	48,819	2.42%	4,134	0.2%	2,109	0.1%	1,472	0.07%	2,813	0.14%	33,197	1.64%
1951	2,059,911	14.7%	80,795	3.92%	855,797	41.55%	282,010	13.69%	777,508	37.74%	41,079	1.99%	3,888	0.19%	2,057	0.1%	—N/a	—N/a	4,161	0.2%	12,616	0.61%
1961	2,844,263	15.6%	92,477	3.25%	908,127	31.93%	283,908	9.98%	1,437,169	50.53%	66,789	2.35%	12,363	0.43%	4,025	0.14%	—N/a	—N/a	6,663	0.23%	32,742	1.15%
1971	3,295,540	15.28%	38,495	1.17%	933,045	28.31%	309,640	9.4%	1,655,250	50.23%	165,745	5.03%	68,090	2.07%	45,510	1.38%	36,040	1.09%	20,230	0.61%	23,490	0.71%
1981	3,867,160	16.06%	16,755	0.43%	884,915	22.88%	312,015	8.07%	1,684,410	43.56%	543,495	14.05%	174,145	4.5%	102,725	2.66%	108,450	2.8%	33,515	0.87%	6,740	0.17%
1986	3,908,150	15.62%	25,900	0.66%	793,075	20.29%	282,025	7.22%	1,616,120	41.35%	692,600	17.72%	193,440	4.95%	114,415	2.93%	147,795	3.78%	34,490	0.88%	8,290	0.21%
1991	4,342,890	16.09%	28,405	0.65%	717,750	16.53%	249,075	5.74%	1,618,550	37.27%	1,064,770	24.52%	232,520	5.35%	166,175	3.83%	219,390	5.05%	38,360	0.88%	7,895	0.18%
1996	4,971,070	17.43%	28,940	0.58%	655,535	13.19%	244,690	4.92%	1,647,585	33.14%	1,562,770	31.44%	279,405	5.62%	229,295	4.61%	273,820	5.51%	44,360	0.89%	4,670	0.09%
2001	5,448,480	18.38%	25,850	0.47%	606,000	11.12%	237,920	4.37%	1,655,705	30.39%	1,989,180	36.51%	294,050	5.4%	282,600	5.19%	304,645	5.59%	47,935	0.88%	4,595	0.08%
2006	6,186,950	19.8%	22,370	0.36%	579,620	9.37%	250,535	4.05%	1,676,355	27.1%	2,525,155	40.81%	317,765	5.14%	374,565	6.05%	381,170	6.16%	52,770	0.85%	6,645	0.11%
2011	6,775,765	20.62%	28,035	0.41%	537,040	7.93%	263,470	3.89%	1,562,710	23.06%	3,041,100	44.88%	351,430	5.19%	492,025	7.26%	442,720	6.53%	54,530	0.8%	2,705	0.04%
2016	7,540,830	21.88%	28,325	0.38%	499,120	6.62%	253,715	3.36%	1,560,960	20.7%	3,629,160	48.13%	383,495	5.09%	637,485	8.45%	490,255	6.5%	56,925	0.75%	1,390	0.02%
2021	8,361,505	23.02%	29,300	0.35%	464,140	5.55%	256,090	3.06%	1,474,180	17.63%	4,307,005	51.51%	402,780	4.82%	821,740	9.83%	541,645	6.48%	61,900	0.74%	2,725	0.03%

== 2021 census ==
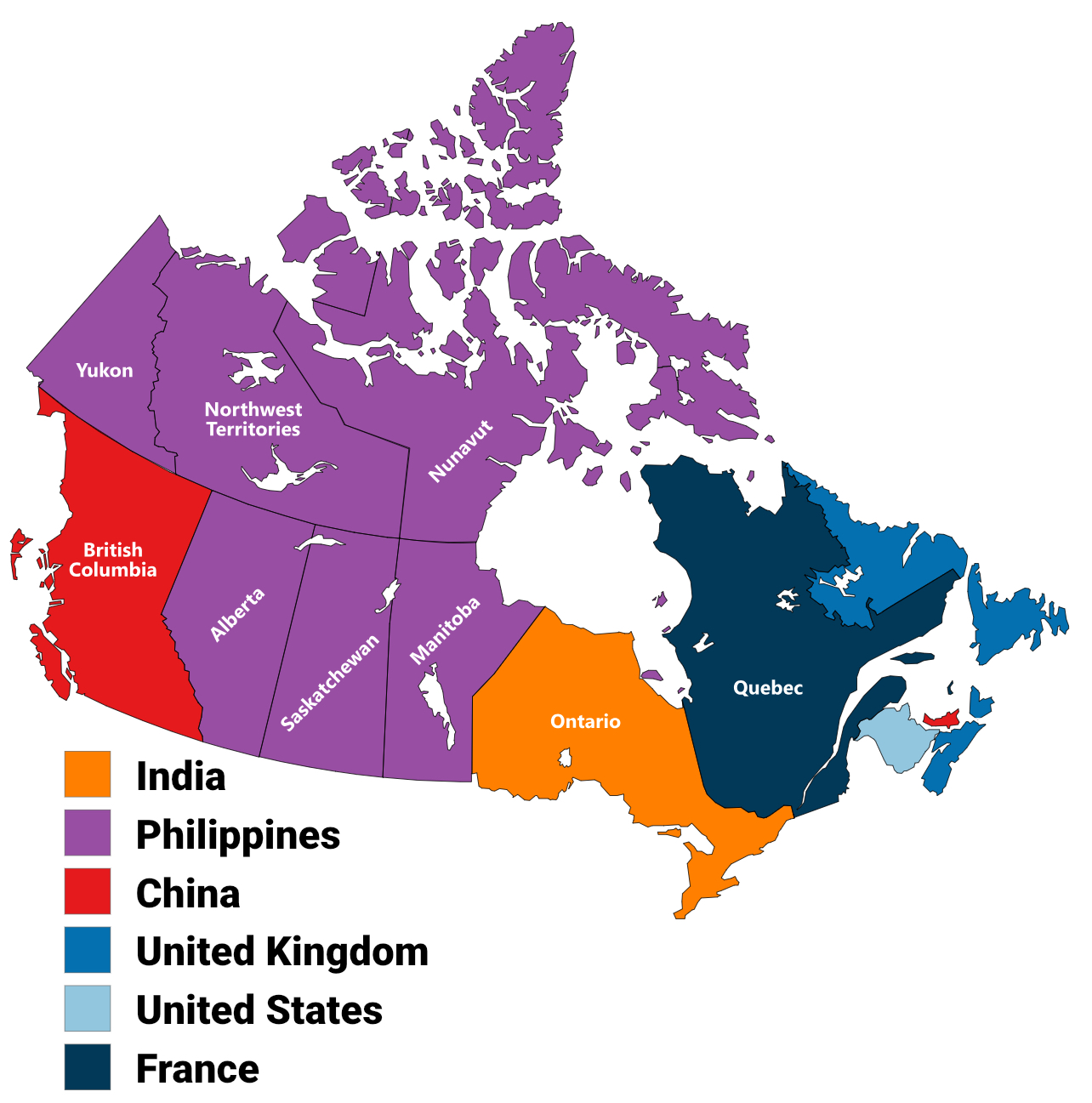
Largest nation of immigrants by province and territory, 2021 census

The 2021 census reported that immigrants comprised 8,361,505 individuals or 23.0 percent of the total Canadian population. Of the total immigrant population, the top countries of origin were India (898,045 persons or 10.7%), Philippines (719,580 persons or 8.6%), China (715,835 persons or 8.6%), United Kingdom (464,135 persons or 5.6%), United States (256,085 persons or 3.1%), Pakistan (234,110 persons or 2.8%), Hong Kong (213,855 persons or 2.6%), Italy (204,065 persons or 2.4%), Iran (182,940 persons or 2.2%), and Vietnam (182,095 persons or 2.2%).

Total immigrant population by country of birth, 2021 Canadian census Immigrant refers to all those who hold or have ever held permanent resident status in Canada, including naturalized citizens.
Rank	Country of birth	Immigrant population	Proportion of immigrants in Canada	Proportion of Canadian population	Notes
—N/a	Canada	8,361,505	100%	23.02%	—N/a
1	India	898,050	10.74%	2.47%	—N/a
2	Philippines	719,575	8.61%	1.98%	—N/a
3	China	715,830	8.56%	1.97%	Officially the People's Republic of China. Excludes Hong Kong and Macau (included in this table below).
4	United Kingdom	464,140	5.55%	1.28%	Officially the United Kingdom of Great Britain and Northern Ireland. Includes Scotland, Wales, England and Northern Ireland. Excludes Isle of Man, the Channel Islands, and British Overseas Territories.
5	United States	256,090	3.06%	0.7%	—N/a
6	Pakistan	234,105	2.8%	0.64%	—N/a
7	Hong Kong	213,855	2.56%	0.59%	Officially the Hong Kong Special Administrative Region of China.
8	Italy	204,065	2.44%	0.56%	—N/a
9	Iran	182,940	2.19%	0.5%	—N/a
10	Vietnam	182,090	2.18%	0.5%	Many from the former Republic of Vietnam
11	Jamaica	145,355	1.74%	0.4%	—N/a
12	South Korea	138,350	1.65%	0.38%	Officially the Republic of Korea.
13	Sri Lanka	136,240	1.63%	0.38%	—N/a
14	Poland	135,030	1.61%	0.37%	—N/a
15	Portugal	128,800	1.54%	0.35%	—N/a
16	Germany	126,475	1.51%	0.35%	—N/a
17	France	121,525	1.45%	0.33%	—N/a
18	Haiti	99,940	1.2%	0.28%	—N/a
19	Syria	97,590	1.17%	0.27%	—N/a
20	Lebanon	95,725	1.14%	0.26%	—N/a
21	Mexico	90,585	1.08%	0.25%	—N/a
22	Romania	86,765	1.04%	0.24%	—N/a
23	Guyana	85,530	1.02%	0.24%	—N/a
24	Iraq	84,125	1.01%	0.23%	—N/a
25	Russia	81,840	0.98%	0.23%	—N/a
26	Morocco	81,775	0.98%	0.23%	—N/a
27	Nigeria	81,290	0.97%	0.22%	—N/a
28	Ukraine	81,135	0.97%	0.22%	—N/a
29	Colombia	80,570	0.96%	0.22%	—N/a
30	Algeria	79,665	0.95%	0.22%	—N/a
31	Netherlands	75,830	0.91%	0.21%	—N/a
32	Egypt	73,705	0.88%	0.2%	—N/a
33	Bangladesh	70,090	0.84%	0.19%	—N/a
34	Taiwan	65,360	0.78%	0.18%	—N/a
35	Trinidad and Tobago	65,040	0.78%	0.18%	—N/a
36	Afghanistan	62,455	0.75%	0.17%	—N/a
37	Greece	54,715	0.65%	0.15%	—N/a
38	South Africa	51,590	0.62%	0.14%	—N/a
39	El Salvador	49,445	0.59%	0.14%	—N/a
40	Brazil	48,450	0.58%	0.13%	—N/a
41	Ethiopia	41,715	0.5%	0.11%	—N/a
42	Croatia	36,680	0.44%	0.1%	—N/a
43	Bosnia and Herzegovina	35,925	0.43%	0.1%	—N/a
44	Turkey	35,270	0.42%	0.1%	—N/a
45	Democratic Republic of the Congo	33,115	0.4%	0.09%	—N/a
46	Somalia	32,500	0.39%	0.09%	—N/a
47	Serbia	31,925	0.38%	0.09%	Excludes Kosovo.
48	Peru	31,415	0.38%	0.09%	—N/a
49	Hungary	31,045	0.37%	0.09%	—N/a
50	Japan	30,875	0.37%	0.08%	—N/a
51	Saudi Arabia	29,585	0.35%	0.08%	—N/a
52	United Arab Emirates	29,405	0.35%	0.08%	—N/a
53	Israel	29,395	0.35%	0.08%	—N/a
54	Ireland	29,300	0.35%	0.08%	Also known as the Republic of Ireland
55	Kenya	29,230	0.35%	0.08%	—N/a
56	Cameroon	28,755	0.34%	0.08%	—N/a
57	Chile	27,755	0.33%	0.08%	—N/a
58	Venezuela	27,315	0.33%	0.08%	—N/a
59	Ghana	25,755	0.31%	0.07%	—N/a
60	Australia	25,200	0.3%	0.07%	Includes Norfolk Island.
61	Malaysia	25,060	0.3%	0.07%	—N/a
62	Fiji	24,715	0.3%	0.07%	—N/a
63	Tunisia	24,425	0.29%	0.07%	—N/a
64	Cambodia	23,070	0.28%	0.06%	—N/a
65	Tanzania	21,595	0.26%	0.06%	—N/a
66	Moldova	20,070	0.24%	0.06%	—N/a
67	Cuba	19,545	0.23%	0.05%	—N/a
68	Czech Republic	19,545	0.23%	0.05%	—N/a
69	Argentina	19,530	0.23%	0.05%	—N/a
70	Nepal	19,375	0.23%	0.05%	—N/a
71	Bulgaria	19,170	0.23%	0.05%	—N/a
72	Ivory Coast	18,860	0.23%	0.05%	—N/a
73	Belgium	18,655	0.22%	0.05%	—N/a
74	Switzerland	18,190	0.22%	0.05%	—N/a
75	Mauritius	18,140	0.22%	0.05%	—N/a
76	Guatemala	18,030	0.22%	0.05%	—N/a
77	Albania	17,825	0.21%	0.05%	—N/a
78	Kuwait	17,655	0.21%	0.05%	—N/a
79	Jordan	17,525	0.21%	0.05%	—N/a
80	Thailand	17,415	0.21%	0.05%	—N/a
81	Ecuador	16,320	0.2%	0.04%	—N/a
82	Indonesia	16,025	0.19%	0.04%	—N/a
83	Sudan	16,025	0.19%	0.04%	—N/a
84	Uganda	15,120	0.18%	0.04%	—N/a
85	Kazakhstan	13,965	0.17%	0.04%	—N/a
86	Laos	13,955	0.17%	0.04%	—N/a
87	Saint Vincent and the Grenadines	13,935	0.17%	0.04%	—N/a
88	Austria	13,835	0.17%	0.04%	—N/a
89	Barbados	13,665	0.16%	0.04%	—N/a
90	Dominican Republic	13,360	0.16%	0.04%	—N/a
91	Burundi	13,050	0.16%	0.04%	—N/a
93	Singapore	12,560	0.15%	0.03%	—N/a
94	Belarus	12,190	0.15%	0.03%	—N/a
95	Zimbabwe	12,050	0.14%	0.03%	—N/a
96	Spain	11,510	0.14%	0.03%	—N/a
97	Denmark	11,000	0.13%	0.03%	—N/a
98	Nicaragua	10,730	0.13%	0.03%	—N/a
99	New Zealand	10,675	0.13%	0.03%	—N/a
100	North Macedonia	10,195	0.12%	0.03%	—N/a
101	Senegal	10,045	0.12%	0.03%	—N/a
102	Grenada	9,895	0.12%	0.03%	—N/a
103	Myanmar	9,230	0.11%	0.03%	—N/a
104	Honduras	8,980	0.11%	0.02%	—N/a
105	Palestine (West Bank and Gaza Strip)	8,960	0.11%	0.02%	Recorded as "West Bank and Gaza Strip (Palestine)", since "Palestine" refers to pre-1948 British mandate Palestine. West Bank and Gaza Strip are the territories referred to in the Oslo I Accord, signed by Israel and the PLO in 1993.
106	Kosovo	8,445	0.1%	0.02%	—N/a
107	Finland	8,420	0.1%	0.02%	—N/a
108	Libya	8,300	0.1%	0.02%	—N/a
109	Rwanda	7,950	0.1%	0.02%	—N/a
110	Uzbekistan	7,075	0.08%	0.02%	—N/a
111	Slovenia	6,935	0.08%	0.02%	—N/a
112	Saint Lucia	6,730	0.08%	0.02%	—N/a
113	Sweden	6,680	0.08%	0.02%	—N/a
114	Uruguay	6,435	0.08%	0.02%	—N/a
115	Malta	6,305	0.08%	0.02%	—N/a
116	Guinea	6,205	0.07%	0.02%	—N/a
117	Paraguay	6,080	0.07%	0.02%	—N/a
118	South Sudan	5,995	0.07%	0.02%	—N/a
119	Macao	5,320	0.06%	0.01%	—N/a
120	Azerbaijan	5,205	0.06%	0.01%	—N/a
121	Latvia	5,075	0.06%	0.01%	—N/a
122	Armenia	5,065	0.06%	0.01%	—N/a
123	Lithuania	4,930	0.06%	0.01%	—N/a
124	Togo	4,885	0.06%	0.01%	—N/a
125	Yemen	4,695	0.06%	0.01%	—N/a
126	Costa Rica	4,655	0.06%	0.01%	—N/a
127	Brunei	4,525	0.05%	0.01%	—N/a
128	Madagascar	4,295	0.05%	0.01%	—N/a
129	Qatar	4,110	0.05%	0.01%	—N/a
130	Cyprus	4,105	0.05%	0.01%	—N/a
131	Bhutan	3,990	0.05%	0.01%	—N/a
132	Kyrgyzstan	3,940	0.05%	0.01%	—N/a
133	Benin	3,885	0.05%	0.01%	—N/a
134	Norway	3,850	0.05%	0.01%	—N/a
135	Bolivia	3,840	0.05%	0.01%	—N/a
136	Angola	3,510	0.04%	0.01%	—N/a
137	Zambia	3,475	0.04%	0.01%	—N/a
138	Georgia	3,305	0.04%	0.01%	—N/a
139	Djibouti	3,245	0.04%	0.01%	—N/a
140	Sierra Leone	3,120	0.04%	0.01%	—N/a
141	Republic of the Congo	3,070	0.04%	0.01%	—N/a
142	Burkina Faso	2,935	0.04%	0.01%	—N/a
143	Dominica	2,900	0.03%	0.01%	—N/a
144	Mali	2,835	0.03%	0.01%	—N/a
145	Bahrain	2,810	0.03%	0.01%	—N/a
146	Panama	2,805	0.03%	0.01%	—N/a
147	Liberia	2,645	0.03%	0.01%	—N/a
148	Estonia	2,600	0.03%	0.01%	—N/a
149	Antigua and Barbuda	2,435	0.03%	0.01%	—N/a
150	Oman	2,240	0.03%	0.01%	—N/a
—N/a	Total immigrants	8,361,505	100%	23.02%	—N/a

== 2016 census ==
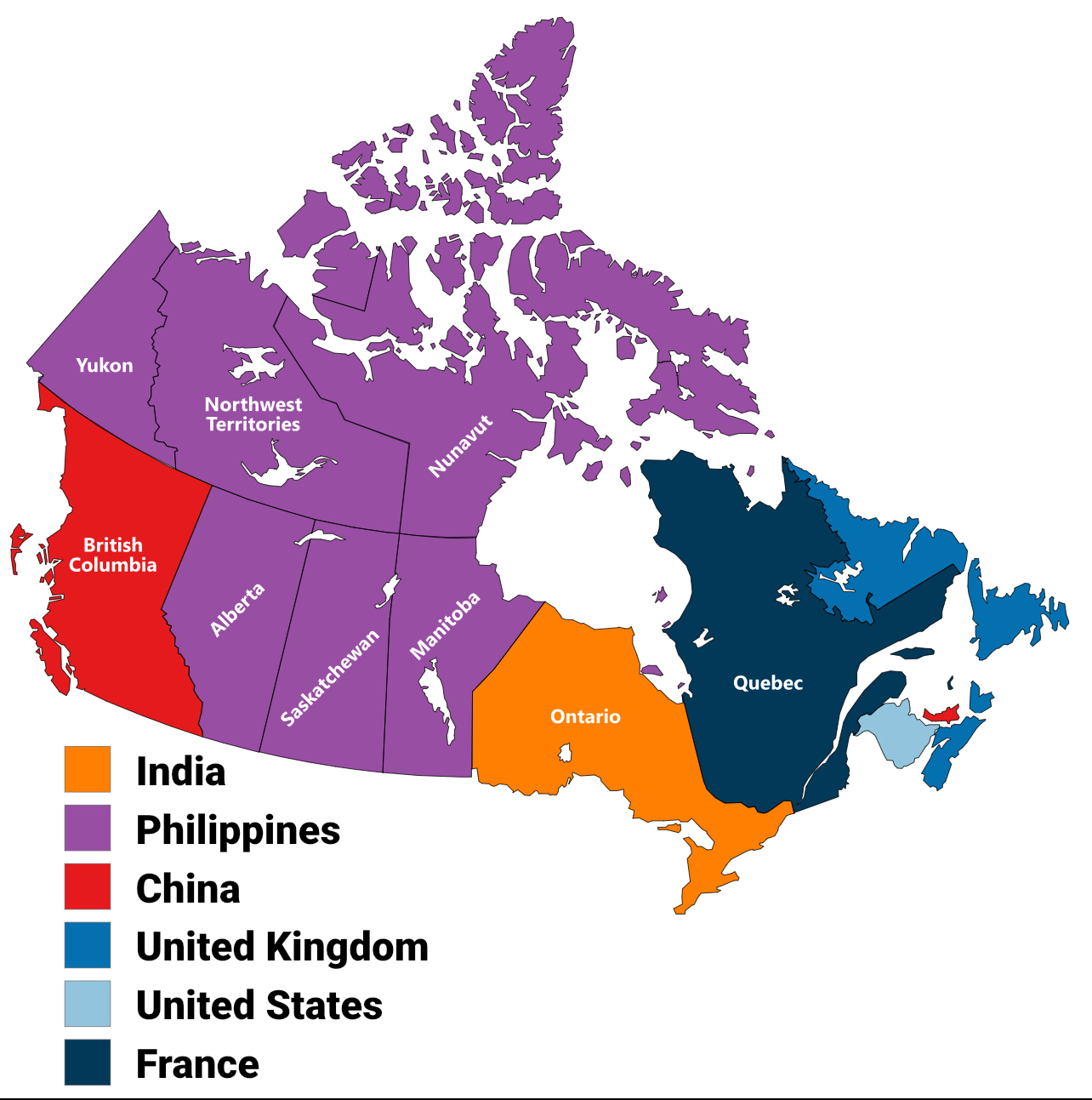
Largest nation of immigrants by province and territory, 2016 census

The 2016 census reported that immigrants comprised 7,540,830 individuals or 21.9 percent of the total Canadian population. Of the total immigrant population, the top countries of origin were India (668,565 persons or 8.9%), China (649,260 persons or 8.6%), Philippines (588,305 persons or 7.8%), United Kingdom (499,120 persons or 6.6%), United States (253,715 persons or 3.4%), Italy (236,635 persons or 3.1%), Hong Kong (208,935 persons or 2.8%), Pakistan (202,255 persons or 2.7%), Vietnam (169,250 persons or 2.2%), and Iran (154,420 persons or 2.1%).

Total immigrant population by country of birth, 2016 Canadian census Immigrant refers to all those who hold or have ever held permanent resident status in Canada, including naturalized citizens.
Rank	Country of birth	Immigrant population	Proportion of immigrants in Canada	Proportion of Canadian population	Notes
—N/a	Canada	7,540,830	100%	21.88%	—N/a
1	India	668,565	8.87%	1.94%	—N/a
2	China	649,260	8.61%	1.88%	Officially the People's Republic of China. Excludes Hong Kong and Macau (included in this table below).
3	Philippines	588,305	7.8%	1.71%	—N/a
4	United Kingdom	499,120	6.62%	1.45%	Officially the United Kingdom of Great Britain and Northern Ireland. Includes Scotland, Wales, England and Northern Ireland. Excludes Isle of Man, the Channel Islands, and British Overseas Territories.
5	United States	253,715	3.36%	0.74%	—N/a
6	Italy	236,635	3.14%	0.69%	—N/a
7	Hong Kong	208,935	2.77%	0.61%	Officially the Hong Kong Special Administrative Region of China.
8	Pakistan	202,255	2.68%	0.59%	—N/a
9	Vietnam	169,250	2.24%	0.49%	Many from the former Republic of Vietnam
10	Iran	154,420	2.05%	0.45%	—N/a
11	Poland	146,470	1.94%	0.43%	—N/a
12	Germany	145,840	1.93%	0.42%	—N/a
13	Portugal	139,450	1.85%	0.4%	—N/a
14	Jamaica	138,345	1.83%	0.4%	—N/a
15	Sri Lanka	131,995	1.75%	0.38%	—N/a
16	Korea, South	123,305	1.64%	0.36%	Officially the Republic of Korea.
17	France	105,570	1.4%	0.31%	—N/a
18	Haiti	93,485	1.24%	0.27%	—N/a
19	Romania	90,310	1.2%	0.26%	—N/a
20	Lebanon	88,740	1.18%	0.26%	—N/a
21	Netherlands	88,475	1.17%	0.26%	—N/a
22	Guyana	87,680	1.16%	0.25%	—N/a
23	Mexico	80,590	1.07%	0.23%	—N/a
24	Russia	78,685	1.04%	0.23%	—N/a
25	Ukraine	73,030	0.97%	0.21%	—N/a
26	Colombia	70,040	0.93%	0.2%	—N/a
27	Morocco	69,655	0.92%	0.2%	—N/a
28	Iraq	68,490	0.91%	0.2%	—N/a
29	Trinidad and Tobago	65,035	0.86%	0.19%	—N/a
30	Algeria	64,625	0.86%	0.19%	—N/a
31	Egypt	64,620	0.86%	0.19%	—N/a
32	Taiwan	63,770	0.85%	0.19%	—N/a
33	Greece	62,715	0.83%	0.18%	—N/a
34	Bangladesh	58,735	0.78%	0.17%	—N/a
35	Syria	52,955	0.7%	0.15%	—N/a
36	Afghanistan	51,960	0.69%	0.15%	—N/a
37	El Salvador	48,075	0.64%	0.14%	—N/a
38	South Africa	44,660	0.59%	0.13%	—N/a
39	Nigeria	42,430	0.56%	0.12%	—N/a
40	Croatia	40,040	0.53%	0.12%	—N/a
41	Hungary	36,825	0.49%	0.11%	—N/a
42	Bosnia and Herzegovina	36,135	0.48%	0.1%	—N/a
43	Serbia	33,320	0.44%	0.1%	Excludes Kosovo.
44	Ethiopia	32,790	0.43%	0.1%	—N/a
45	Peru	29,615	0.39%	0.09%	—N/a
46	Brazil	29,315	0.39%	0.09%	—N/a
47	Ireland	28,320	0.38%	0.08%	Also known as the Republic of Ireland
48	Japan	27,245	0.36%	0.08%	—N/a
49	Somalia	27,230	0.36%	0.08%	—N/a
50	Kenya	27,150	0.36%	0.08%	—N/a
51	Israel	26,735	0.35%	0.08%	—N/a
52	Turkey	26,710	0.35%	0.08%	—N/a
53	Chile	26,705	0.35%	0.08%	—N/a
54	Congo, Democratic Republic of the	25,655	0.34%	0.07%	—N/a
55	Fiji	24,660	0.33%	0.07%	—N/a
56	Malaysia	23,785	0.32%	0.07%	—N/a
57	Cambodia	23,320	0.31%	0.07%	—N/a
58	Ghana	22,910	0.3%	0.07%	—N/a
59	Australia	21,115	0.28%	0.06%	Includes Norfolk Island.
60	Czech Republic	21,065	0.28%	0.06%	—N/a
61	United Arab Emirates	20,990	0.28%	0.06%	—N/a
62	Venezuela	20,775	0.28%	0.06%	—N/a
63	Tanzania	20,600	0.27%	0.06%	—N/a
64	Saudi Arabia	20,080	0.27%	0.06%	—N/a
65	Argentina	19,430	0.26%	0.06%	—N/a
66	Switzerland	19,040	0.25%	0.06%	—N/a
67	Belgium	18,935	0.25%	0.05%	—N/a
68	Bulgaria	18,635	0.25%	0.05%	—N/a
69	Cameroon	18,570	0.25%	0.05%	—N/a
70	Cuba	17,850	0.24%	0.05%	—N/a
71	Moldova	17,605	0.23%	0.05%	—N/a
72	Tunisia	17,435	0.23%	0.05%	—N/a
73	Guatemala	17,275	0.23%	0.05%	—N/a
74	Mauritius	15,900	0.21%	0.05%	—N/a
75	Austria	15,845	0.21%	0.05%	—N/a
76	Albania	15,365	0.2%	0.04%	—N/a
77	Kuwait	15,235	0.2%	0.04%	—N/a
78	Thailand	15,075	0.2%	0.04%	—N/a
79	Eritrea	15,010	0.2%	0.04%	—N/a
80	Ecuador	14,965	0.2%	0.04%	—N/a
81	Laos	14,475	0.19%	0.04%	—N/a
82	Slovakia	14,410	0.19%	0.04%	—N/a
83	Nepal	14,390	0.19%	0.04%	—N/a
84	Indonesia	14,280	0.19%	0.04%	—N/a
85	Barbados	14,095	0.19%	0.04%	—N/a
86	Jordan	13,295	0.18%	0.04%	—N/a
87	Uganda	13,210	0.18%	0.04%	—N/a
88	St. Vincent and the Grenadines	12,945	0.17%	0.04%	—N/a
89	Denmark	12,515	0.17%	0.04%	—N/a
90	Kazakhstan	12,450	0.17%	0.04%	—N/a
91	Singapore	11,820	0.16%	0.03%	—N/a
92	Ivory Coast	11,325	0.15%	0.03%	Also known as Côte d'Ivoire.
93	Belarus	11,190	0.15%	0.03%	—N/a
94	Sudan	10,820	0.14%	0.03%	—N/a
95	Spain	10,700	0.14%	0.03%	—N/a
96	Dominican Republic	10,605	0.14%	0.03%	—N/a
97	Zimbabwe	10,495	0.14%	0.03%	—N/a
98	North Macedonia	10,300	0.14%	0.03%	Officially the Republic of North Macedonia. Also known as the former Yugoslav Republic of Macedonia by the United Nations and other international bodies.
99	Grenada	10,265	0.14%	0.03%	—N/a
100	New Zealand	9,880	0.13%	0.03%	Includes Niue and Tokelau.
101	Nicaragua	9,865	0.13%	0.03%	—N/a
102	Finland	9,525	0.13%	0.03%	—N/a
103	Burundi	8,470	0.11%	0.02%	—N/a
104	Myanmar	8,215	0.11%	0.02%	Also known as Burma.
105	Slovenia	8,210	0.11%	0.02%	—N/a
106	Palestine, West Bank and Gaza Strip	8,210	0.11%	0.02%	Recorded as "West Bank and Gaza Strip (Palestine)", since "Palestine" refers to pre-1948 British mandate Palestine. West Bank and Gaza Strip are the territories referred to in the Oslo I Accord, signed by Israel and the PLO in 1993.
107	Honduras	7,790	0.1%	0.02%	—N/a
108	Kosovo	7,610	0.1%	0.02%	—N/a
109	Senegal	7,515	0.1%	0.02%	—N/a
110	Malta	7,465	0.1%	0.02%	—N/a
111	Paraguay	7,305	0.1%	0.02%	—N/a
112	Sweden	6,630	0.09%	0.02%	—N/a
113	Uruguay	6,535	0.09%	0.02%	—N/a
114	Uzbekistan	6,385	0.08%	0.02%	—N/a
115	Libya	6,300	0.08%	0.02%	—N/a
116	Rwanda	6,105	0.08%	0.02%	—N/a
117	St. Lucia	6,100	0.08%	0.02%	—N/a
118	Latvia	5,875	0.08%	0.02%	—N/a
119	Macau	5,750	0.08%	0.02%	Officially the Macao Special Administrative Region of China.
120	South Sudan	5,540	0.07%	0.02%	—N/a
121	Guinea	5,190	0.07%	0.02%	—N/a
122	Lithuania	4,980	0.07%	0.01%	—N/a
123	Brunei	4,485	0.06%	0.01%	—N/a
124	Bolivia	4,400	0.06%	0.01%	—N/a
125	Bhutan	4,250	0.06%	0.01%	—N/a
126	Armenia	4,165	0.06%	0.01%	—N/a
127	Cyprus	4,020	0.05%	0.01%	—N/a
128	Costa Rica	3,950	0.05%	0.01%	—N/a
129	Norway	3,885	0.05%	0.01%	—N/a
130	Azerbaijan	3,845	0.05%	0.01%	—N/a
131	Zambia	3,715	0.05%	0.01%	—N/a
132	Madagascar	3,555	0.05%	0.01%	—N/a
133	Togo	3,350	0.04%	0.01%	—N/a
134	Estonia	3,200	0.04%	0.01%	—N/a
135	Angola	3,120	0.04%	0.01%	—N/a
136	Sierra Leone	3,040	0.04%	0.01%	—N/a
137	Kyrgyzstan	2,980	0.04%	0.01%	—N/a
138	Yemen	2,960	0.04%	0.01%	—N/a
139	Dominica	2,775	0.04%	0.01%	—N/a
140	Benin	2,760	0.04%	0.01%	—N/a
141	Panama	2,620	0.03%	0.01%	—N/a
142	Georgia	2,570	0.03%	0.01%	—N/a
143	Qatar	2,485	0.03%	0.01%	—N/a
144	Liberia	2,480	0.03%	0.01%	—N/a
145	Republic of the Congo	2,460	0.03%	0.01%	—N/a
146	Bahrain	2,390	0.03%	0.01%	—N/a
147	Antigua and Barbuda	2,310	0.03%	0.01%	—N/a
148	Djibouti	2,235	0.03%	0.01%	—N/a
149	Saint Kitts and Nevis	2,105	0.03%	0.01%	—N/a
150	Mali	2,095	0.03%	0.01%	—N/a
151	Belize	1,995	0.03%	0.01%	—N/a
152	Burkina Faso	1,980	0.03%	0.01%	—N/a
153	Montenegro	1,865	0.02%	0.01%	—N/a
154	Bermuda	1,845	0.02%	0.01%	—N/a
155	Bahamas	1,635	0.02%	0%	—N/a
156	Chad	1,595	0.02%	0%	—N/a
157	Oman	1,540	0.02%	0%	—N/a
158	Mongolia	1,420	0.02%	0%	—N/a
159	Tajikistan	1,310	0.02%	0%	—N/a
160	Mozambique	1,255	0.02%	0%	—N/a
161	Gabon	1,080	0.01%	0%	—N/a
162	Central African Republic	1,055	0.01%	0%	—N/a
163	Suriname	1,050	0.01%	0%	—N/a
164	Namibia	1,035	0.01%	0%	—N/a
164	Others	1,035	0.01%	0%	Includes a small number of immigrants who were born in Canada, as well as other places of birth not included elsewhere (e.g. 'born at sea').
164	Seychelles	1,035	0.01%	0%	—N/a
167	Niger	1,030	0.01%	0%	—N/a
168	Mauritania	905	0.01%	0%	—N/a
169	Botswana	850	0.01%	0%	—N/a
170	North Korea	780	0.01%	0%	Officially the Democratic People's Republic of Korea.
171	Luxembourg	675	0.01%	0%	—N/a
172	Malawi	670	0.01%	0%	—N/a
173	Gambia	665	0.01%	0%	—N/a
174	Martinique	640	0.01%	0%	—N/a
175	Montserrat	610	0.01%	0%	—N/a
176	Iceland	590	0.01%	0%	—N/a
177	Aruba	580	0.01%	0%	—N/a
178	Guadeloupe	515	0.01%	0%	—N/a
179	Puerto Rico	505	0.01%	0%	—N/a
180	Turkmenistan	500	0.01%	0%	—N/a
181	Curaçao	470	0.01%	0%	—N/a
182	Isle of Man	415	0.01%	0%	—N/a
183	Eswatini	400	0.01%	0%	—N/a
184	Jersey	360	0%	0%	—N/a
185	Réunion	295	0%	0%	—N/a
186	Saint Pierre and Miquelon	290	0%	0%	—N/a
187	French Guiana	280	0%	0%	—N/a
188	Cayman Islands	270	0%	0%	—N/a
189	Papua New Guinea	235	0%	0%	—N/a
190	New Caledonia	220	0%	0%	—N/a
191	Guernsey	195	0%	0%	—N/a
192	French Polynesia	185	0%	0%	—N/a
192	Sint Maarten	185	0%	0%	Part of the Kingdom of the Netherlands.
194	Cape Verde	170	0%	0%	—N/a
195	Gibraltar	160	0%	0%	—N/a
196	Samoa	155	0%	0%	—N/a
197	Comoros	140	0%	0%	—N/a
197	Tonga	140	0%	0%	—N/a
199	Northern Mariana Islands	120	0%	0%	—N/a
200	Guinea-Bissau	110	0%	0%	—N/a
200	Monaco	110	0%	0%	—N/a
202	Lesotho	105	0%	0%	—N/a
203	United States Virgin Islands	90	0%	0%	—N/a
204	British Virgin Islands	85	0%	0%	—N/a
205	Liechtenstein	65	0%	0%	—N/a
206	Anguilla	60	0%	0%	—N/a
206	Equatorial Guinea	60	0%	0%	—N/a
206	Turks and Caicos Islands	60	0%	0%	—N/a
209	Greenland	55	0%	0%	—N/a
210	Maldives	50	0%	0%	—N/a
211	Solomon Islands	40	0%	0%	—N/a
212	Faroe Islands	35	0%	0%	—N/a
213	Guam	30	0%	0%	—N/a
213	Palau	30	0%	0%	—N/a
213	Vanuatu	30	0%	0%	—N/a
216	Bonaire	25	0%	0%	—N/a
216	Nauru	25	0%	0%	—N/a
216	São Tomé and Príncipe	25	0%	0%	—N/a
216	East Timor	25	0%	0%	Also known as Timor-Leste.
220	Andorra	20	0%	0%	—N/a
220	Kiribati	20	0%	0%	—N/a
220	Marshall Islands	20	0%	0%	—N/a
223	Falkland Islands	10	0%	0%	—N/a
223	Micronesia	10	0%	0%	—N/a
223	Saint Barthélemy	10	0%	0%	—N/a
223	Saint Helena	10	0%	0%	Officially Saint Helena, Ascension and Tristan da Cunha.
223	Wallis and Futuna	10	0%	0%	—N/a
223	Åland Islands	10	0%	0%	—N/a
—N/a	Total immigrants	7,540,830	100%	21.88%	—N/a

== 2011 census ==
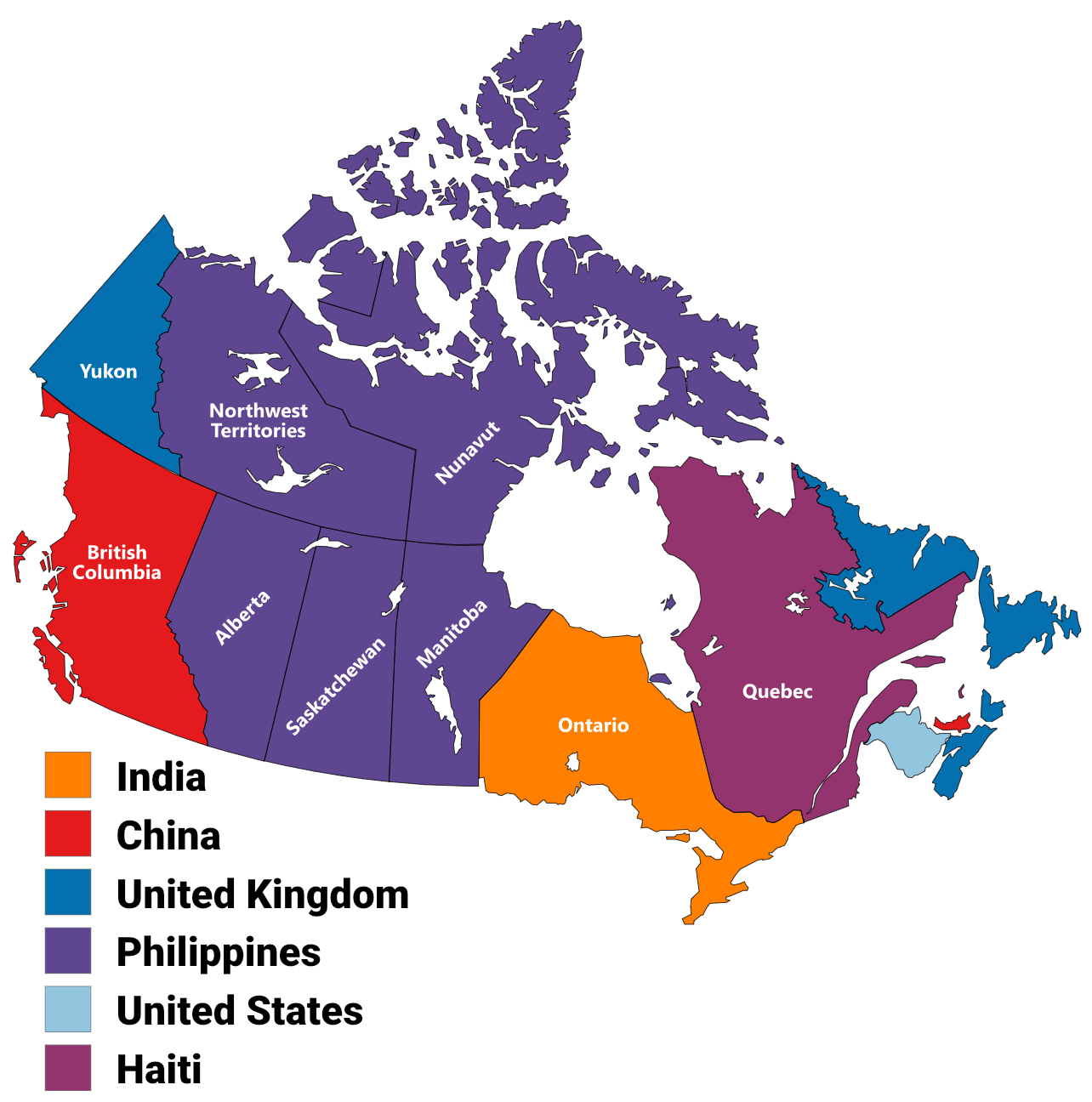
Largest nation of immigrants by province and territory, 2011 census

The 2011 census reported that immigrants comprised 6,775,765 individuals or 20.6 percent of the total Canadian population. Of the total immigrant population, the top countries of origin were India (547,890 persons or 8.1 percent), China (545,535 5persons or 8.1 percent), United Kingdom (537,040 persons or 7.9 percent), Philippines (454,340 persons or 6.7 percent), United States (263,475 persons or 3.9 percent), Italy (256,825 persons or 3.8 percent), Hong Kong (205,430 persons or 3.0 percent), Vietnam (165,125 persons or 2.5 percent), Pakistan (156,860 persons or 2.3 percent), and Germany (152,345 persons or 2.3 percent).

Total immigrant population by country of birth, 2011 Canadian census Immigrant refers to all those who hold or have ever held permanent resident status in Canada, including naturalized citizens.
Rank	Country of birth	Immigrant population	Proportion of immigrants in Canada	Proportion of Canadian population	Notes
—N/a	Canada	6,775,765	100%	20.62%	—N/a
1	India	547,890	8.09%	1.67%	—N/a
2	China	545,535	8.05%	1.66%	Officially the People's Republic of China. Excludes Hong Kong and Macau (included in this table below).
3	United Kingdom	537,040	7.93%	1.63%	Officially the United Kingdom of Great Britain and Northern Ireland. Includes Scotland, Wales, England and Northern Ireland. Excludes Isle of Man, the Channel Islands, and British Overseas Territories.
4	Philippines	454,340	6.71%	1.38%	—N/a
5	United States	263,475	3.89%	0.8%	—N/a
6	Italy	256,825	3.79%	0.78%	—N/a
7	Hong Kong	205,430	3.03%	0.63%	Officially the Hong Kong Special Administrative Region of China.
8	Vietnam	165,125	2.44%	0.5%	Many from the former Republic of Vietnam
9	Pakistan	156,860	2.32%	0.48%	—N/a
10	Germany	152,345	2.25%	0.46%	—N/a
11	Poland	152,290	2.25%	0.46%	—N/a
12	Portugal	138,520	2.04%	0.42%	—N/a
13	Sri Lanka	132,130	1.95%	0.4%	—N/a
14	Jamaica	126,035	1.86%	0.38%	—N/a
15	Iran	120,685	1.78%	0.37%	—N/a
16	South Korea	112,400	1.66%	0.34%	Officially the Republic of Korea.
17	Netherlands	98,510	1.45%	0.3%	—N/a
18	France	90,440	1.33%	0.28%	—N/a
19	Guyana	87,945	1.3%	0.27%	—N/a
20	Haiti	80,100	1.18%	0.24%	—N/a
21	Mexico	69,695	1.03%	0.21%	
22	Romania	82,595	1.22%	0.25%	—N/a
23	Lebanon	81,105	1.2%	0.25%	—N/a
24	Russia	73,030	1.08%	0.22%	—N/a
25	Trinidad and Tobago	67,205	0.99%	0.2%	—N/a
26	Taiwan	66,455	0.98%	0.2%	—N/a
27	Greece	66,475	0.98%	0.2%	—N/a
28	Ukraine	65,455	0.97%	0.2%	—N/a
29	Colombia	60,555	0.89%	0.18%	—N/a
30	Morocco	56,275	0.83%	0.17%	—N/a
31	Algeria	51,085	0.75%	0.16%	—N/a
32	Egypt	49,935	0.74%	0.15%	—N/a
33	Iraq	49,515	0.73%	0.15%	—N/a
34	Bangladesh	45,320	0.67%	0.14%	—N/a
35	El Salvador	43,655	0.64%	0.13%	—N/a
36	South Africa	40,550	0.6%	0.12%	—N/a
37	Afghanistan	40,945	0.6%	0.12%	—N/a
38	Croatia	40,010	0.59%	0.12%	—N/a
39	Hungary	38,985	0.58%	0.12%	—N/a
40	Bosnia and Herzegovina	35,885	0.53%	0.11%	—N/a
41	Serbia	32,600	0.48%	0.1%	Excludes Kosovo.
42	Nigeria	27,625	0.41%	0.08%	—N/a
43	Ireland	28,040	0.41%	0.09%	Also known as the Republic of Ireland
44	Peru	26,715	0.39%	0.08%	—N/a
45	Japan	25,805	0.38%	0.08%	—N/a
46	Brazil	24,660	0.36%	0.08%	—N/a
47	Ethiopia	24,535	0.36%	0.07%	—N/a
48	Kenya	24,510	0.36%	0.07%	—N/a
49	Somalia	22,800	0.34%	0.07%	—N/a
50	Syria	22,725	0.34%	0.07%	—N/a
—N/a	Total immigrants	6,775,765	100%	20.62%	—N/a

== 2006 census ==
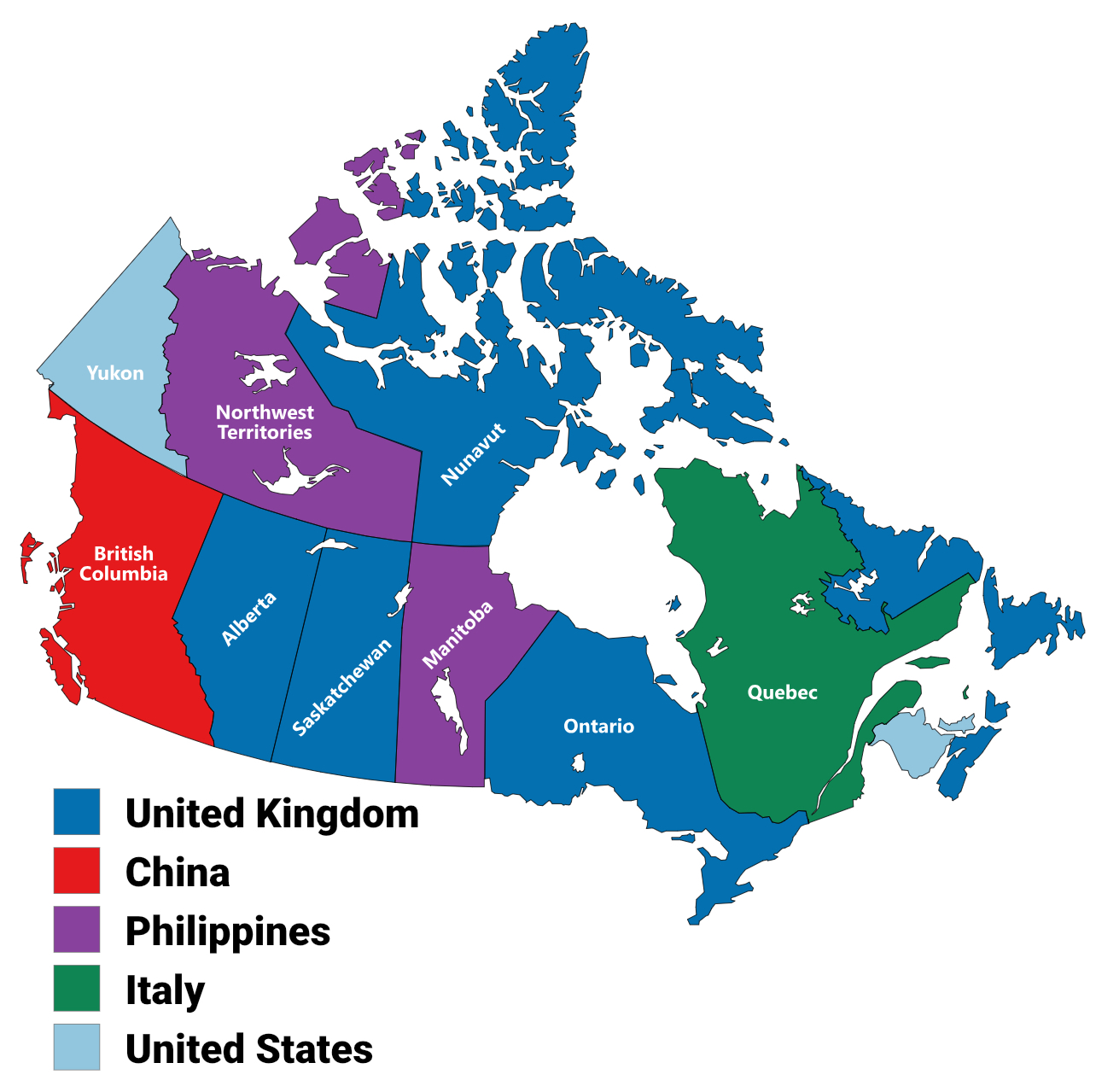
Largest nation of immigrants by province and territory, 2006 census

The 2006 census reported that immigrants comprised 6,186,950 individuals or 19.8 percent of the total Canadian population. Of the total immigrant population, the top countries of origin were United Kingdom (579,620 persons or 9.4%), China (466,940 persons or 7.6%), India (443,690 persons or 7.2%), Philippines (303,195 persons or 4.9%), Italy (296,850 persons or 4.8%), United States (250,535 persons or 4.1%), Hong Kong (215,430 persons or 3.5%), Germany (171,405 persons or 2.8%), Poland (170,490 persons or 2.8%), and Vietnam (160,170 persons or 2.6%).

Total immigrant population by country of birth, 2006 Canadian census Immigrant refers to all those who hold or have ever held permanent resident status in Canada, including naturalized citizens.
Rank	Country of birth	Immigrant population	Proportion of immigrants in Canada	Proportion of Canadian population	Notes
—N/a	Canada	6,186,950	100%	19.8%	—N/a
1	United Kingdom	579,620	9.37%	1.86%	Officially the United Kingdom of Great Britain and Northern Ireland. Includes Scotland, Wales, England and Northern Ireland. Excludes Isle of Man, the Channel Islands, and British Overseas Territories.
2	China	466,940	7.55%	1.49%	Officially the People's Republic of China. Excludes Hong Kong and Macau (included in this table below).
3	India	443,690	7.17%	1.42%	—N/a
4	Philippines	303,195	4.9%	0.97%	—N/a
5	Italy	296,850	4.8%	0.95%	—N/a
6	United States	250,535	4.05%	0.8%	—N/a
7	Hong Kong	215,430	3.48%	0.69%	Officially the Hong Kong Special Administrative Region of China.
8	Germany	171,405	2.77%	0.55%	—N/a
9	Poland	170,490	2.76%	0.55%	—N/a
10	Vietnam	160,170	2.59%	0.51%	Many from the former Republic of Vietnam
11	Portugal	150,390	2.43%	0.48%	—N/a
12	Pakistan	133,280	2.15%	0.43%	—N/a
13	Jamaica	123,420	1.99%	0.4%	—N/a
14	Netherlands	111,990	1.81%	0.36%	—N/a
15	Sri Lanka	105,670	1.71%	0.34%	—N/a
16	South Korea	98,395	1.59%	0.31%	Officially the Republic of Korea.
17	Iran	92,090	1.49%	0.29%	—N/a
18	Guyana	87,195	1.41%	0.28%	—N/a
19	Romania	82,645	1.34%	0.26%	—N/a
20	France	79,550	1.29%	0.25%	—N/a
21	Lebanon	75,275	1.22%	0.24%	—N/a
22	Greece	73,125	1.18%	0.23%	—N/a
23	Trinidad and Tobago	65,540	1.06%	0.21%	—N/a
24	Taiwan	65,205	1.05%	0.21%	—N/a
25	Russia	64,130	1.04%	0.21%	—N/a
26	Haiti	63,350	1.02%	0.2%	—N/a
27	Ukraine	59,460	0.96%	0.19%	—N/a
28	Mexico	49,925	0.81%	0.16%	—N/a
29	Hungary	45,940	0.74%	0.15%	—N/a
30	El Salvador	42,780	0.69%	0.14%	—N/a
31	Egypt	40,575	0.66%	0.13%	—N/a
32	Croatia	39,250	0.63%	0.13%	—N/a
33	Colombia	39,145	0.63%	0.13%	—N/a
34	Morocco	39,055	0.63%	0.13%	—N/a
35	South Africa	38,305	0.62%	0.12%	—N/a
36	Yugoslavia n.o.s.	37,205	0.6%	0.12%	The abbreviation 'n.o.s.' means 'not otherwise specified.'
37	Afghanistan	36,165	0.58%	0.12%	—N/a
38	Iraq	33,545	0.54%	0.11%	—N/a
39	Bangladesh	33,230	0.54%	0.11%	—N/a
40	Algeria	32,255	0.52%	0.1%	—N/a
41	Bosnia and Herzegovina	28,730	0.46%	0.09%	—N/a
42	Chile	26,505	0.43%	0.08%	—N/a
43	Serbia and Montenegro	25,465	0.41%	0.08%	—N/a
44	Fiji	24,390	0.39%	0.08%	—N/a
45	Kenya	22,475	0.36%	0.07%	—N/a
46	Ireland	22,370	0.36%	0.07%	Also known as the Republic of Ireland
47	Peru	22,080	0.36%	0.07%	—N/a
48	Czech Republic	22,030	0.36%	0.07%	—N/a
49	Malaysia	21,885	0.35%	0.07%	—N/a
50	Japan	21,705	0.35%	0.07%	—N/a
51	Turkey	21,580	0.35%	0.07%	—N/a
52	Israel	21,320	0.34%	0.07%	—N/a
53	Austria	20,795	0.34%	0.07%	—N/a
54	Belgium	20,215	0.33%	0.06%	—N/a
55	Cambodia	20,190	0.33%	0.06%	—N/a
56	Switzerland	19,955	0.32%	0.06%	—N/a
57	Tanzania	19,765	0.32%	0.06%	—N/a
58	Ethiopia	19,715	0.32%	0.06%	—N/a
59	Somalia	19,515	0.32%	0.06%	—N/a
60	Ghana	18,830	0.3%	0.06%	—N/a
—N/a	Total immigrants	6,186,950	100%	19.8%	—N/a

== 2001 census ==
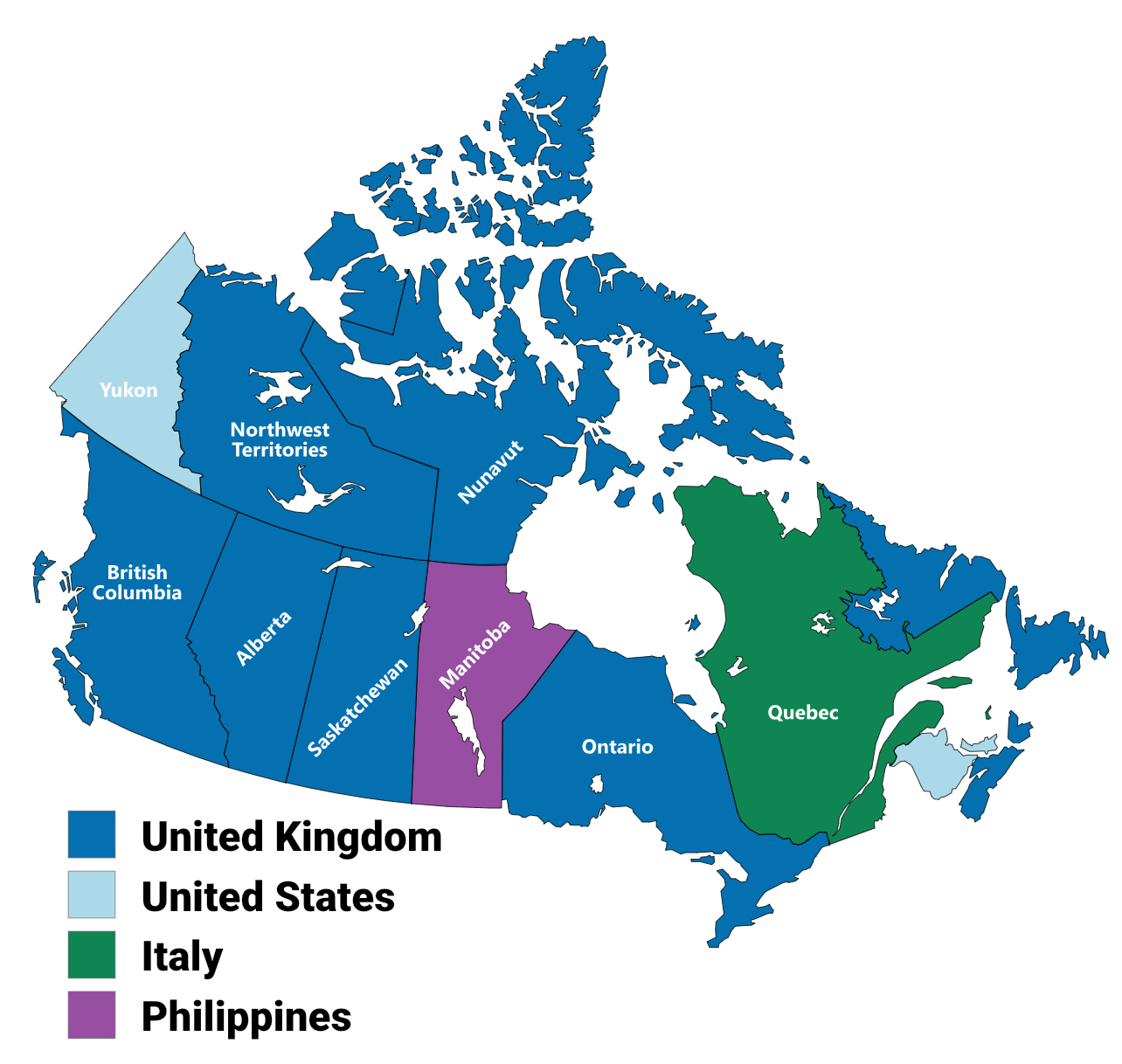
Largest nation of immigrants by province and territory, 2001 census

The 2001 census reported that immigrants comprised 5,448,480 individuals or 18.4 percent of the total Canadian population. Of the total immigrant population, the top countries of origin were United Kingdom (605,995 persons or 11.1%), China (332,825 persons or 6.1%), Italy (315,455 persons or 5.8%), India (314,690 persons or 5.8%), United States (237,920 persons or 4.4%), Hong Kong (235,620 persons or 4.3%), Philippines (232,670 persons or 4.3%), Poland (180,415 persons or 3.3%), Germany (174,070 persons or 3.2%), and Portugal (153,535 persons or 2.8%).

Total immigrant population by country of birth, 2001 Canadian census Immigrant refers to all those who hold or have ever held permanent resident status in Canada, including naturalized citizens.
Rank	Country of birth	Immigrant population	Proportion of immigrants in Canada	Proportion of Canadian population	Notes
—N/a	Canada	5,448,480	100%	18.38%	—N/a
1	United Kingdom	605,995	11.12%	2.04%	Officially the United Kingdom of Great Britain and Northern Ireland. Includes Scotland, Wales, England and Northern Ireland. Excludes Isle of Man, the Channel Islands, and British Overseas Territories.
2	China	332,825	6.11%	1.12%	Officially the People's Republic of China. Excludes Hong Kong and Macau (included in this table below).
3	Italy	315,455	5.79%	1.06%	—N/a
4	India	314,690	5.78%	1.06%	—N/a
5	United States	237,920	4.37%	0.8%	—N/a
6	Hong Kong	235,620	4.32%	0.79%	Officially the Hong Kong Special Administrative Region of China.
7	Philippines	232,670	4.27%	0.79%	—N/a
8	Poland	180,415	3.31%	0.61%	—N/a
9	Germany	174,070	3.19%	0.59%	—N/a
10	Portugal	153,535	2.82%	0.52%	—N/a
11	Vietnam	148,405	2.72%	0.5%	Many from the former Republic of Vietnam
12	Yugoslavia	145,380	2.67%	0.49%	Serbia: 63,875 / Croatia: 39,375 / Bosnia: 25,665 / Slovenia: 9,250 / Macedonia: 7,215
13	Soviet Union	141,960	2.61%	0.48%	Ukrainian SSR: 51,610 / Russian SFSR: 48,425 / Baltic: 20,905 / Other: 21,020
14	Jamaica	120,210	2.21%	0.41%	—N/a
15	Netherlands	117,690	2.16%	0.4%	—N/a
16	Sri Lanka	87,305	1.6%	0.29%	—N/a
17	Guyana	83,535	1.53%	0.28%	—N/a
18	Pakistan	79,310	1.46%	0.27%	—N/a
19	Greece	75,765	1.39%	0.26%	—N/a
20	Iran	71,985	1.32%	0.24%	—N/a
21	South Korea & North Korea	70,635	1.3%	0.24%	Includes South Korea and North Korea.
22	France	69,460	1.27%	0.23%	—N/a
23	Lebanon	67,225	1.23%	0.23%	—N/a
24	Taiwan	67,095	1.23%	0.23%	—N/a
25	Trinidad and Tobago	64,145	1.18%	0.22%	—N/a
26	Romania	60,165	1.1%	0.2%	—N/a
27	Haiti	52,625	0.97%	0.18%	—N/a
28	Hungary	48,715	0.89%	0.16%	—N/a
29	Scandinavia	45,165	0.83%	0.15%	Denmark: 17,805 / Finland: 14,030 / Sweden: 6,810 / Norway: 6,105 / Iceland: 415
30	Czechoslovakia	39,760	0.73%	0.13%	—N/a
31	El Salvador	38,460	0.71%	0.13%	—N/a
32	Mexico	36,225	0.66%	0.12%	—N/a
33	Egypt	35,975	0.66%	0.12%	—N/a
34	South Africa	34,990	0.64%	0.12%	—N/a
35	Ireland	25,850	0.47%	0.09%	Also known as the Republic of Ireland
36	Iraq	25,830	0.47%	0.09%	—N/a
37	Morocco	24,640	0.45%	0.08%	—N/a
38	Chile	24,495	0.45%	0.08%	—N/a
39	Fiji	22,340	0.41%	0.08%	—N/a
40	Austria	22,135	0.41%	0.07%	—N/a
41	Bangladesh	21,595	0.4%	0.07%	—N/a
42	Afghanistan	21,710	0.4%	0.07%	—N/a
43	Malaysia	20,420	0.37%	0.07%	—N/a
44	Switzerland	20,020	0.37%	0.07%	—N/a
45	Kenya	19,815	0.36%	0.07%	—N/a
46	Belgium	19,760	0.36%	0.07%	—N/a
47	Tanzania	19,315	0.35%	0.07%	—N/a
48	Algeria	19,095	0.35%	0.06%	—N/a
49	Cambodia	18,745	0.34%	0.06%	—N/a
50	Somalia	18,635	0.34%	0.06%	—N/a
51	Japan	17,625	0.32%	0.06%	—N/a
52	Peru	17,125	0.31%	0.06%	—N/a
53	Turkey	16,410	0.3%	0.06%	—N/a
54	Ghana	16,145	0.3%	0.05%	—N/a
55	Israel	15,995	0.29%	0.05%	—N/a
56	Syria	15,680	0.29%	0.05%	—N/a
57	Colombia	15,505	0.28%	0.05%	—N/a
58	Barbados	14,650	0.27%	0.05%	—N/a
59	Laos	14,110	0.26%	0.05%	—N/a
60	Ethiopia	13,710	0.25%	0.05%	—N/a
—N/a	Total immigrants	5,448,480	100%	18.38%	—N/a

== 1996 census ==
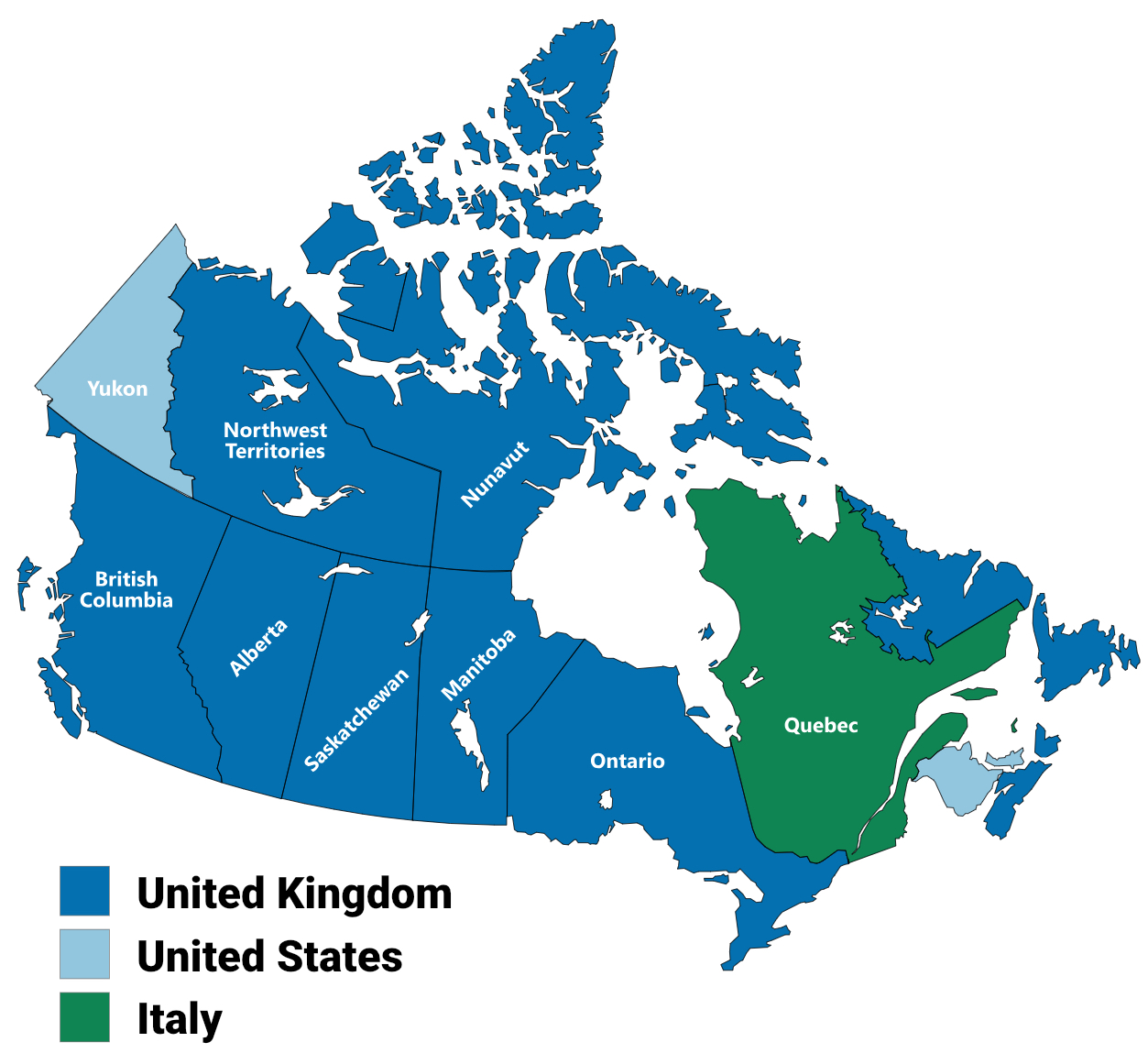
Largest nation of immigrants by province and territory, 1996 census

The 1996 census reported that immigrants comprised 4,971,070 individuals or 17.4 percent of the total Canadian population. Of the total immigrant population, the top countries of origin were United Kingdom (655,535 persons or 13.2%), Italy (332,110 persons or 6.7%), United States (244,695 persons or 4.9%), Hong Kong (241,095 persons or 4.9%), India (235,930 persons or 4.8%), China (231,055 persons or 4.7%), Poland (193,375 persons or 3.9%), Philippines (184,550 persons or 3.7%), Germany (181,650 persons or 3.7%), and Portugal (158,815 persons or 3.2%).

Total immigrant population by country of birth, 1996 Canadian census Immigrant refers to all those who hold or have ever held permanent resident status in Canada, including naturalized citizens.
Rank	Country of birth	Immigrant population	Proportion of immigrants in Canada	Proportion of Canadian population	Notes
—N/a	Canada	4,971,070	100%	17.43%	—N/a
1	United Kingdom	655,535	13.19%	2.3%	Includes England, Wales, Scotland, and Northern Ireland.
2	Italy	332,110	6.68%	1.16%	—N/a
3	United States	244,695	4.92%	0.86%	—N/a
4	Hong Kong	241,095	4.85%	0.85%	—N/a
5	India	235,930	4.75%	0.83%	—N/a
6	China	231,055	4.65%	0.81%	—N/a
7	Poland	193,375	3.89%	0.68%	—N/a
8	Philippines	184,550	3.71%	0.65%	—N/a
9	Germany	181,650	3.65%	0.64%	—N/a
10	Portugal	158,815	3.19%	0.56%	—N/a
11	Vietnam	139,325	2.8%	0.49%	—N/a
12	Netherlands	124,545	2.51%	0.44%	—N/a
13	Yugoslavia	121,975	2.45%	0.43%	—N/a
14	Jamaica	115,800	2.33%	0.41%	—N/a
15	Soviet Union	108,390	2.18%	0.38%	—N/a
16	Greece	79,695	1.6%	0.28%	—N/a
17	Guyana	77,700	1.56%	0.27%	—N/a
18	Sri Lanka	67,425	1.36%	0.24%	—N/a
19	Lebanon	63,130	1.27%	0.22%	—N/a
20	France	62,600	1.26%	0.22%	—N/a
21	Trinidad and Tobago	62,020	1.25%	0.22%	—N/a
22	Hungary	54,225	1.09%	0.19%	—N/a
23	Scandinavia	50,145	1.01%	0.18%	—N/a
24	Haiti	49,395	0.99%	0.17%	—N/a
25	Taiwan	49,290	0.99%	0.17%	—N/a
26	Iran	47,405	0.95%	0.17%	—N/a
27	Romania	46,400	0.93%	0.16%	—N/a
28	South Korea & North Korea	46,025	0.93%	0.16%	—N/a
29	Czechoslovakia	41,225	0.83%	0.14%	—N/a
30	Pakistan	39,245	0.79%	0.14%	—N/a
31	El Salvador	39,020	0.78%	0.14%	—N/a
32	Other Caribbean	36,965	0.74%	0.13%	—N/a
33	Egypt	33,930	0.68%	0.12%	—N/a
34	Ireland	28,940	0.58%	0.1%	—N/a
35	South Africa	28,465	0.57%	0.1%	—N/a
36	Mexico	27,480	0.55%	0.1%	—N/a
37	Austria	24,600	0.49%	0.09%	—N/a
38	Chile	23,880	0.48%	0.08%	—N/a
39	Other Central & West Asia	22,730	0.46%	0.08%	—N/a
40	Belgium	21,805	0.44%	0.08%	—N/a
41	Fiji	20,580	0.41%	0.07%	—N/a
42	Morocco	20,435	0.41%	0.07%	—N/a
43	Israel & Palestine	20,390	0.41%	0.07%	—N/a
44	Malaysia	19,460	0.39%	0.07%	—N/a
45	Other South America	19,445	0.39%	0.07%	—N/a
46	Cambodia	19,355	0.39%	0.07%	—N/a
47	Switzerland	19,310	0.39%	0.07%	—N/a
48	Ethiopia	18,595	0.37%	0.07%	—N/a
49	Tanzania	18,130	0.36%	0.06%	—N/a
50	Kenya	18,005	0.36%	0.06%	—N/a
51	Other East Africa	17,555	0.35%	0.06%	—N/a
52	Iraq	16,795	0.34%	0.06%	—N/a
53	Somalia	16,740	0.34%	0.06%	—N/a
54	Peru	15,235	0.31%	0.05%	—N/a
55	Barbados	15,225	0.31%	0.05%	—N/a
56	Japan	14,990	0.3%	0.05%	—N/a
57	Laos	14,765	0.3%	0.05%	—N/a
58	Australia	14,660	0.29%	0.05%	—N/a
59	Turkey	14,430	0.29%	0.05%	—N/a
60	Other East & Southeast Asia	14,300	0.29%	0.05%	—N/a
61	Guatemala	13,270	0.27%	0.05%	—N/a
62	Syria	13,105	0.26%	0.05%	—N/a
63	Ghana	13,085	0.26%	0.05%	—N/a
64	Argentina	11,740	0.24%	0.04%	—N/a
65	Spain	11,240	0.23%	0.04%	—N/a
66	Afghanistan	10,915	0.22%	0.04%	—N/a
67	Other South Asia	10,910	0.22%	0.04%	—N/a
68	Uganda	10,755	0.22%	0.04%	—N/a
69	Ecuador	9,640	0.19%	0.03%	—N/a
70	Colombia	9,465	0.19%	0.03%	—N/a
71	Malta	9,445	0.19%	0.03%	—N/a
72	Other West Africa	9,440	0.19%	0.03%	—N/a
73	Brazil	9,360	0.19%	0.03%	—N/a
74	Other Central America	9,025	0.18%	0.03%	—N/a
75	Nicaragua	8,545	0.17%	0.03%	—N/a
76	Indonesia	8,515	0.17%	0.03%	—N/a
77	Other North Africa	8,355	0.17%	0.03%	—N/a
78	Algeria	8,005	0.16%	0.03%	—N/a
79	Other Europe	7,980	0.16%	0.03%	—N/a
80	Singapore	7,970	0.16%	0.03%	—N/a
81	Other Central & Southern Africa	7,810	0.16%	0.03%	—N/a
82	Thailand	7,710	0.16%	0.03%	—N/a
83	Others	13,780	0.28%	0.05%	—N/a
—N/a	Total immigrants	4,971,070	100%	17.43%	—N/a

== 1991 census ==
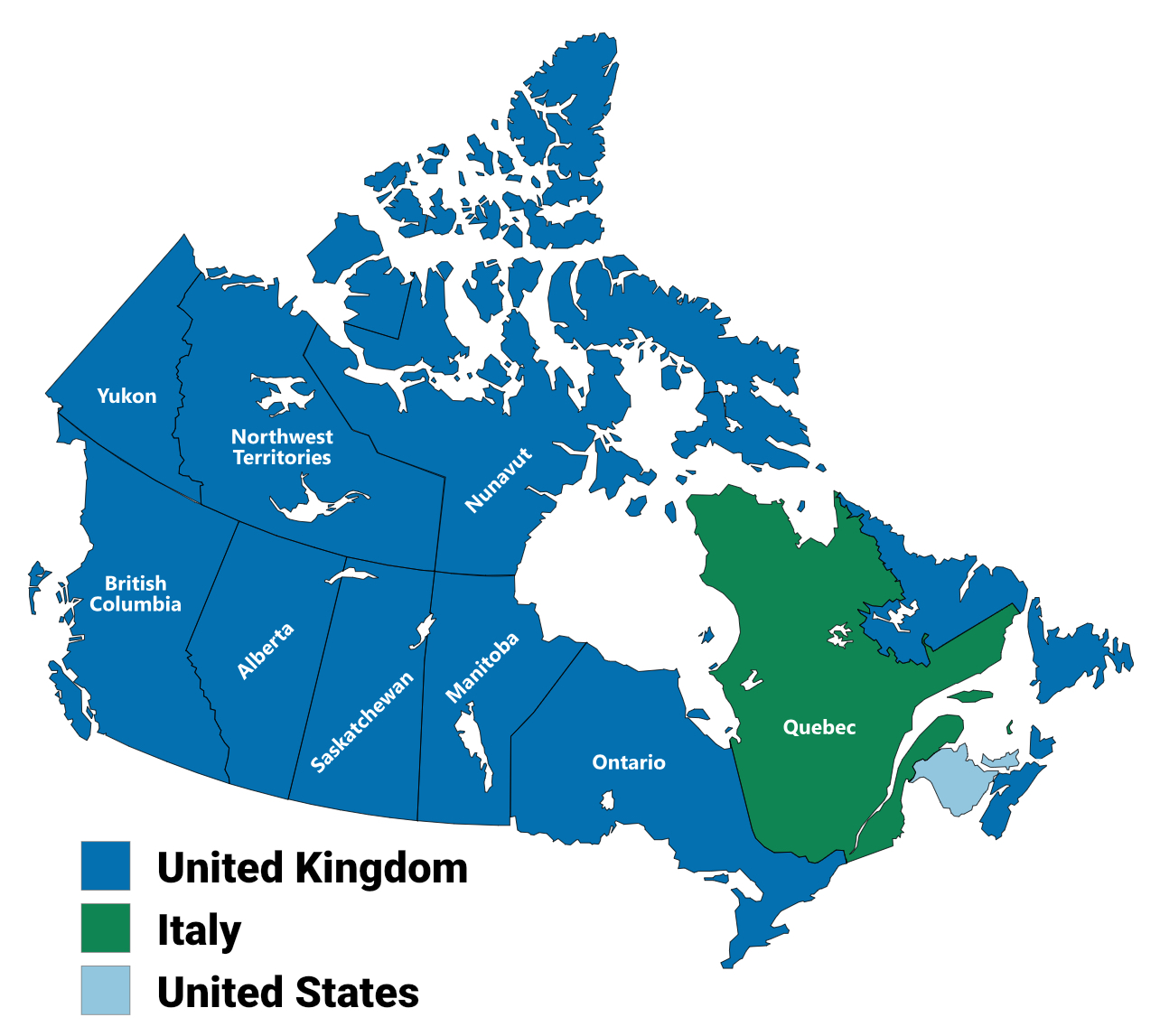
Largest nation of immigrants by province and territory, 1991 census

The 1991 census reported that immigrants comprised 4,342,890 individuals or 16.1 percent of the total Canadian population. Of the total immigrant population, the top countries of origin were United Kingdom (717,750 persons or 16.5%), Italy (351,615 persons or 8.1%), United States (249,075 persons or 5.7%), Poland (184,695 persons or 4.3%), Germany (180,525 persons or 4.2%), India (173,675 persons or 4%), Portugal (161,180 persons or 3.7%), China (157,405 persons or 3.6%), Hong Kong (152,450 persons or 3.5%), and Netherlands (129,615 persons or 3%).

Total immigrant population by country of birth, 1991 Canadian census Immigrant refers to all those who hold or have ever held permanent resident status in Canada, including naturalized citizens.
Rank	Country of birth	Immigrant population	Proportion of immigrants in Canada	Proportion of Canadian population	Notes
—N/a	Canada	4,342,890	100%	16.09%	—N/a
1	United Kingdom	717,750	16.53%	2.66%	Includes England, Wales, Scotland, and Northern Ireland.
2	Italy	351,615	8.1%	1.3%	—N/a
3	United States	249,075	5.74%	0.92%	—N/a
4	Poland	184,695	4.25%	0.68%	—N/a
5	Germany	180,525	4.16%	0.67%	—N/a
6	India	173,675	4%	0.64%	—N/a
7	Portugal	161,180	3.71%	0.6%	—N/a
8	China	157,405	3.62%	0.58%	Officially the People's Republic of China. Excludes Hong Kong and Macau.
9	Hong Kong	152,450	3.51%	0.56%	—N/a
10	Netherlands	129,615	2.98%	0.48%	—N/a
11	Philippines	123,295	2.84%	0.46%	—N/a
12	Vietnam	113,595	2.62%	0.42%	Many from the former Republic of Vietnam.
13	Jamaica	102,440	2.36%	0.38%	—N/a
14	Soviet Union	99,355	2.29%	0.37%	—N/a
15	Yugoslavia	88,815	2.05%	0.33%	—N/a
16	Greece	83,680	1.93%	0.31%	—N/a
17	Guyana	66,060	1.52%	0.24%	—N/a
18	Hungary	57,010	1.31%	0.21%	—N/a
19	France	55,160	1.27%	0.2%	—N/a
20	Scandinavia	54,980	1.27%	0.2%	—N/a
21	Lebanon	54,600	1.26%	0.2%	—N/a
22	Trinidad and Tobago	49,385	1.14%	0.18%	—N/a
23	Czechoslovakia	42,615	0.98%	0.16%	—N/a
24	Haiti	39,880	0.92%	0.15%	—N/a
25	Romania	33,785	0.78%	0.13%	—N/a
26	South Korea & North Korea	33,170	0.76%	0.12%	Includes South Korea and North Korea.
27	Iran	30,710	0.71%	0.11%	—N/a
28	Ireland	28,405	0.65%	0.11%	Also known as the Republic of Ireland.
29	El Salvador	28,295	0.65%	0.1%	—N/a
30	Egypt	28,020	0.65%	0.1%	—N/a
31	Austria	26,680	0.61%	0.1%	—N/a
32	Other Caribbean	25,995	0.6%	0.1%	—N/a
33	Sri Lanka	25,435	0.59%	0.09%	—N/a
34	Pakistan	25,180	0.58%	0.09%	—N/a
35	South Africa	24,730	0.57%	0.09%	—N/a
36	Chile	22,870	0.53%	0.08%	—N/a
37	Belgium	22,480	0.52%	0.08%	—N/a
38	Mexico	19,400	0.45%	0.07%	—N/a
39	Cambodia	17,960	0.41%	0.07%	—N/a
40	Tanzania	17,820	0.41%	0.07%	—N/a
41	Taiwan	17,770	0.41%	0.07%	—N/a
42	Morocco	16,790	0.39%	0.06%	—N/a
43	Israel & Palestine	16,770	0.39%	0.06%	—N/a
44	Kenya	16,585	0.38%	0.06%	—N/a
45	Switzerland	16,330	0.38%	0.06%	—N/a
46	Malaysia	16,100	0.37%	0.06%	—N/a
47	Fiji	15,995	0.37%	0.06%	—N/a
48	Other South America	15,840	0.36%	0.06%	—N/a
49	Barbados	14,825	0.34%	0.05%	—N/a
50	Laos	14,445	0.33%	0.05%	—N/a
51	Australia	13,955	0.32%	0.05%	—N/a
52	Other East Africa	12,570	0.29%	0.05%	—N/a
53	Japan	12,280	0.28%	0.05%	—N/a
54	Turkey	12,180	0.28%	0.05%	—N/a
55	Peru	11,480	0.26%	0.04%	—N/a
56	Spain	11,170	0.26%	0.04%	—N/a
57	Argentina	11,110	0.26%	0.04%	—N/a
58	Ethiopia	11,060	0.25%	0.04%	—N/a
59	Syria	11,005	0.25%	0.04%	—N/a
60	Other East & Southeast Asia	10,995	0.25%	0.04%	—N/a
61	Malta	10,185	0.23%	0.04%	—N/a
62	Uganda	8,960	0.21%	0.03%	—N/a
63	Guatemala	8,920	0.21%	0.03%	—N/a
64	Other Central & West Asia	8,815	0.2%	0.03%	—N/a
65	Other Europe	8,665	0.2%	0.03%	—N/a
66	Ecuador	8,015	0.18%	0.03%	—N/a
67	Colombia	7,865	0.18%	0.03%	—N/a
68	Indonesia	7,610	0.18%	0.03%	—N/a
69	Brazil	7,330	0.17%	0.03%	—N/a
70	Iraq	7,165	0.16%	0.03%	—N/a
71	Ghana	6,675	0.15%	0.02%	—N/a
72	Nicaragua	6,460	0.15%	0.02%	—N/a
73	Singapore	6,285	0.14%	0.02%	—N/a
74	Thailand	5,815	0.13%	0.02%	—N/a
75	Other Central America	5,745	0.13%	0.02%	—N/a
76	Afghanistan	5,545	0.13%	0.02%	—N/a
77	Somalia	5,290	0.12%	0.02%	—N/a
78	Other West Africa	5,285	0.12%	0.02%	—N/a
79	Other North Africa	4,515	0.1%	0.02%	—N/a
80	Other South Asia	4,500	0.1%	0.02%	—N/a
81	Other Central & Southern Africa	3,985	0.09%	0.01%	—N/a
82	Algeria	3,900	0.09%	0.01%	—N/a
83	Others	16,305	0.38%	0.06%	—N/a
—N/a	Total immigrants	4,342,890	100%	16.09%	—N/a

== 1986 census ==
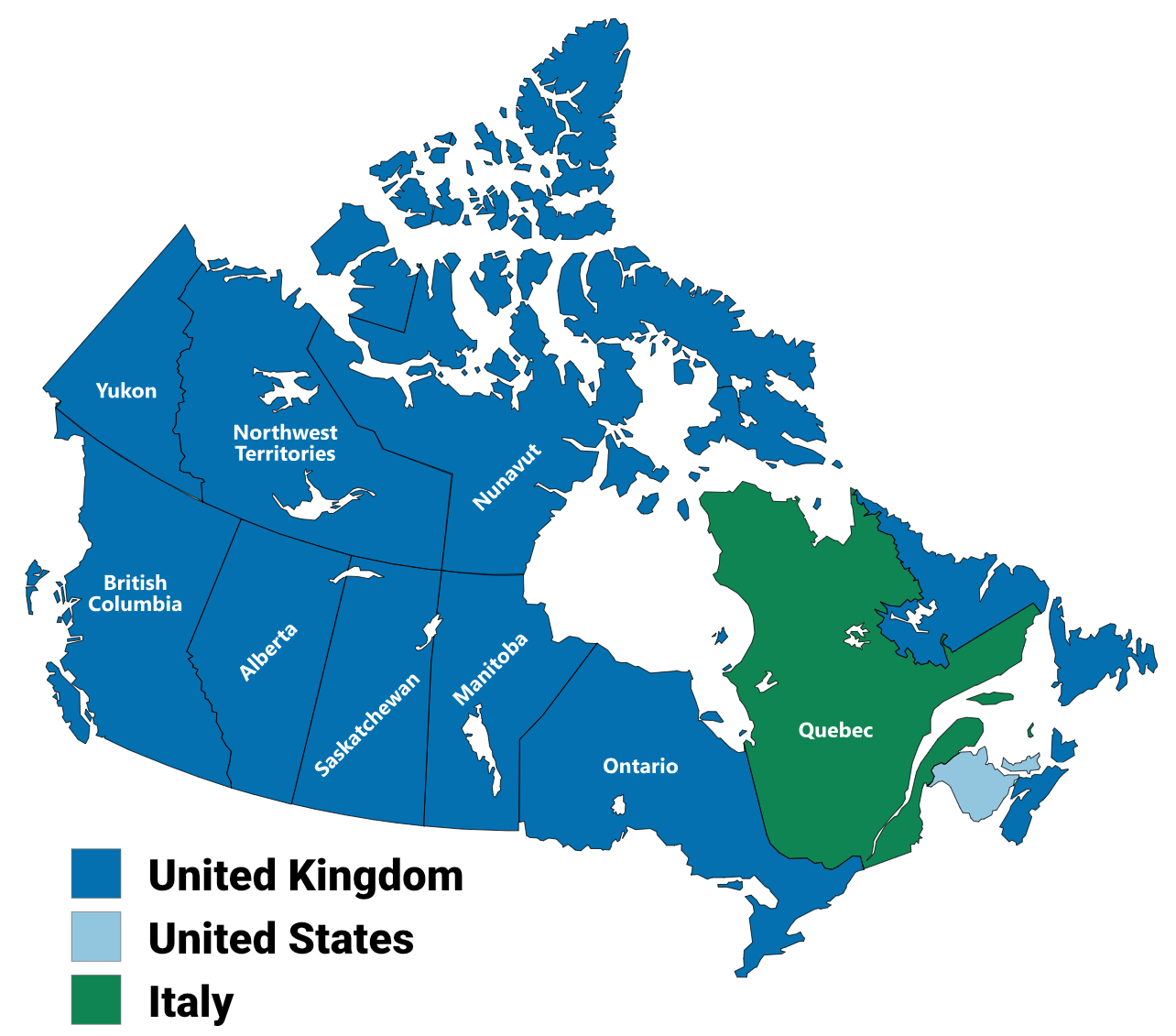
Largest nation of immigrants by province and territory, 1986 census

The 1986 census reported that immigrants comprised 3,908,140 individuals or 15.6 percent of the total Canadian population. Of the total immigrant population, the top countries of origin were United Kingdom (793,075 persons or 20.3%), Italy (366,820 persons or 9.4%), United States (282,025 persons or 7.2%), Germany (189,560 persons or 4.9%), Poland (156,800 persons or 4.0%), Portugal (139,635 persons or 3.6%), Netherlands (134,155 persons or 3.4%), India (130,055 persons or 3.3%), China (119,195 persons or 3.1%), and the Soviet Union (109,445 persons or 2.8%).

Total immigrant population by country of birth, 1986 Canadian census Immigrant refers to all those who hold or have ever held permanent resident status in Canada, including naturalized citizens.
Rank	Country of birth	Immigrant population	Proportion of immigrants in Canada	Proportion of Canadian population	Notes
—N/a	Canada	3,908,140	100%	15.62%	—N/a
1	United Kingdom	793,075	20.29%	3.17%	Includes England, Wales, Scotland, and Northern Ireland.
2	Italy	366,820	9.39%	1.47%	—N/a
3	United States	282,025	7.22%	1.13%	—N/a
4	Germany	189,560	4.85%	0.76%	Includes West Germany & East Germany.
5	Poland	156,800	4.01%	0.63%	—N/a
6	Portugal	139,635	3.57%	0.56%	—N/a
7	Netherlands	134,155	3.43%	0.54%	—N/a
8	India	130,055	3.33%	0.52%	—N/a
9	China	119,195	3.05%	0.48%	Officially the People's Republic of China. Excludes Hong Kong and Macau.
10	Soviet Union	109,445	2.8%	0.44%	—N/a
11	Yugoslavia	87,755	2.25%	0.35%	—N/a
12	Jamaica	87,605	2.24%	0.35%	—N/a
13	Greece	85,090	2.18%	0.34%	—N/a
14	Vietnam	82,760	2.12%	0.33%	Includes North Vietnam & South Vietnam.
15	Philippines	82,235	2.1%	0.33%	—N/a
16	Hong Kong	77,410	1.98%	0.31%	—N/a
17	Scandinavia	62,370	1.6%	0.25%	—N/a
18	Hungary	61,280	1.57%	0.24%	—N/a
19	France	53,345	1.36%	0.21%	—N/a
20	Guyana	50,815	1.3%	0.2%	—N/a
21	Czechoslovakia	42,335	1.08%	0.17%	—N/a
22	Trinidad and Tobago	40,000	1.02%	0.16%	—N/a
23	Haiti	31,950	0.82%	0.13%	—N/a
24	Austria	30,635	0.78%	0.12%	—N/a
25	Romania	25,910	0.66%	0.1%	—N/a
26	Ireland	25,900	0.66%	0.1%	Also known as the Republic of Ireland.
27	Lebanon	25,190	0.64%	0.1%	—N/a
28	Belgium	23,445	0.6%	0.09%	—N/a
29	Egypt	22,560	0.58%	0.09%	—N/a
30	South Korea & North Korea	22,475	0.58%	0.09%	—N/a
31	Other Caribbean	20,090	0.51%	0.08%	—N/a
32	South Africa	18,785	0.48%	0.08%	—N/a
33	Chile	17,800	0.46%	0.07%	—N/a
34	Pakistan	16,800	0.43%	0.07%	—N/a
35	Switzerland	15,995	0.41%	0.06%	—N/a
36	Tanzania	14,030	0.36%	0.06%	—N/a
37	Iran	13,950	0.36%	0.06%	—N/a
38	Mexico	13,845	0.35%	0.06%	—N/a
39	Barbados	13,795	0.35%	0.06%	—N/a
40	Australia	13,585	0.35%	0.05%	—N/a
41	Other South America	13,375	0.34%	0.05%	—N/a
42	Morocco	13,250	0.34%	0.05%	—N/a
43	Spain	12,760	0.33%	0.05%	—N/a
44	Israel & Palestine	12,570	0.32%	0.05%	—N/a
45	Cambodia	12,435	0.32%	0.05%	—N/a
46	Fiji	12,310	0.31%	0.05%	—N/a
47	Japan	12,035	0.31%	0.05%	—N/a
48	Laos	11,775	0.3%	0.05%	—N/a
49	El Salvador	11,245	0.29%	0.04%	—N/a
50	Malta	10,795	0.28%	0.04%	—N/a
51	Kenya	10,570	0.27%	0.04%	—N/a
52	Turkey	10,355	0.26%	0.04%	—N/a
53	Uganda	9,375	0.24%	0.04%	—N/a
54	Sri Lanka	9,365	0.24%	0.04%	—N/a
55	Malaysia	9,215	0.24%	0.04%	—N/a
56	Other East Africa	8,660	0.22%	0.03%	—N/a
57	Argentina	8,365	0.21%	0.03%	—N/a
58	Other Central & West Asia	7,955	0.2%	0.03%	—N/a
59	Taiwan	7,210	0.18%	0.03%	—N/a
60	Other East & Southeast Asia	6,630	0.17%	0.03%	—N/a
61	Ecuador	6,590	0.17%	0.03%	—N/a
62	Indonesia	6,375	0.16%	0.03%	—N/a
63	Syria	6,105	0.16%	0.02%	—N/a
64	Peru	5,905	0.15%	0.02%	—N/a
65	Colombia	5,660	0.14%	0.02%	—N/a
66	Brazil	4,990	0.13%	0.02%	—N/a
67	Iraq	4,595	0.12%	0.02%	—N/a
68	Guatemala	4,325	0.11%	0.02%	—N/a
69	Singapore	4,025	0.1%	0.02%	—N/a
70	Other Europe	3,365	0.09%	0.01%	—N/a
71	Other Central America	3,100	0.08%	0.01%	—N/a
72	Ghana	2,980	0.08%	0.01%	—N/a
73	Other West Africa	2,960	0.08%	0.01%	—N/a
74	Ethiopia	2,900	0.07%	0.01%	—N/a
75	Other Central & Southern Africa	2,815	0.07%	0.01%	—N/a
76	Thailand	2,810	0.07%	0.01%	—N/a
77	Other North Africa	2,715	0.07%	0.01%	—N/a
78	Algeria	2,635	0.07%	0.01%	—N/a
79	Other South Asia	2,365	0.06%	0.01%	—N/a
80	Afghanistan	1,335	0.03%	0.01%	—N/a
81	Nicaragua	1,270	0.03%	0.01%	—N/a
82	Somalia	180	0%	0%	—N/a
83	Other	17,385	0.44%	0.07%	—N/a
—N/a	Total immigrants	3,908,140	100%	15.62%	—N/a

== 1981 census ==
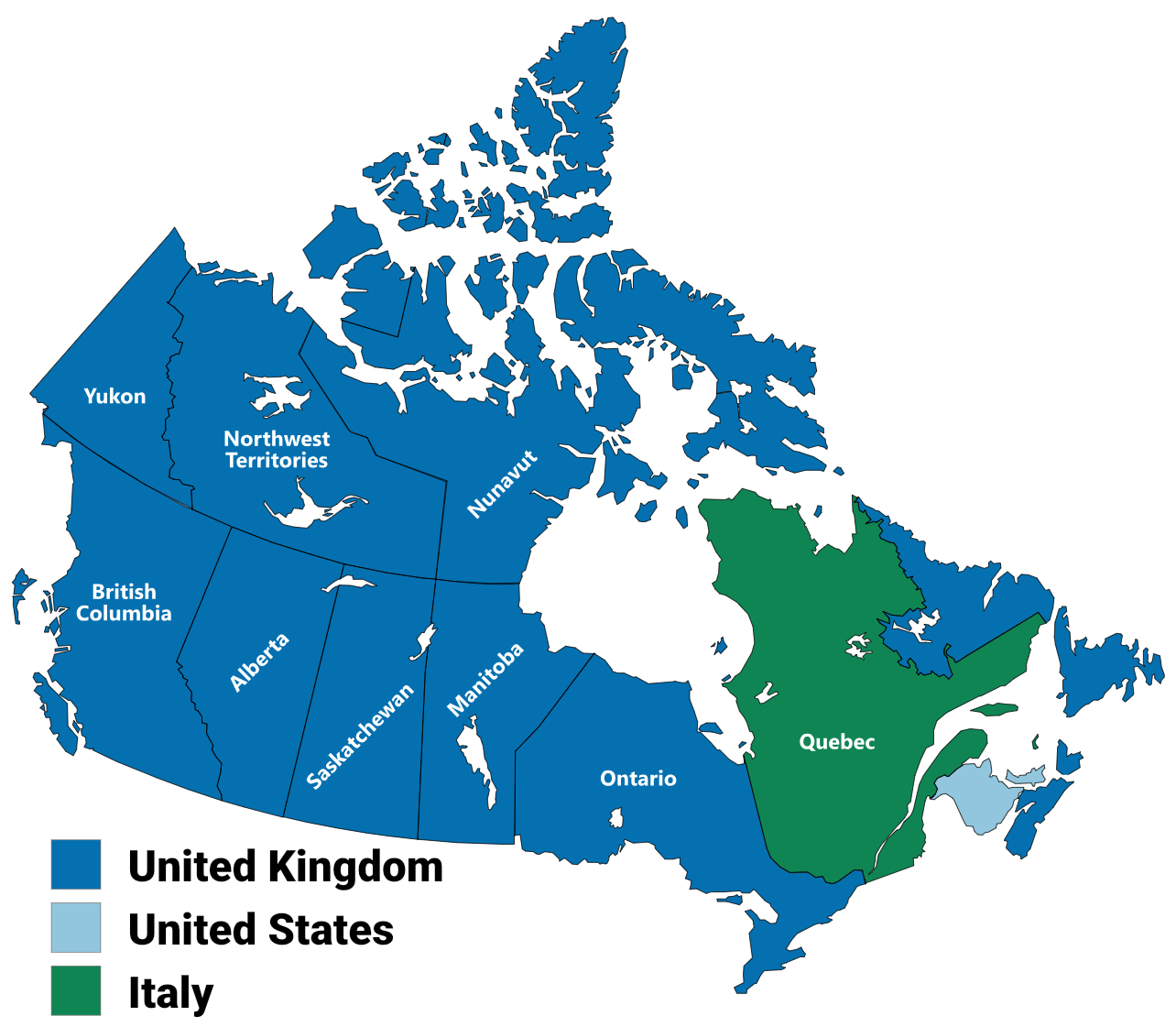
Largest nation of immigrants by province and territory, 1981 census

The 1981 census reported that immigrants comprised 3,867,160 individuals or 16.1 percent of the total Canadian population. Of the total immigrant population, the top countries of origin were United Kingdom (884,915 persons or 22.9%), Italy (386,505 persons or 10%), United States (312,015 persons or 8.1%), Germany (198,215 persons or 5.1%), Poland (148,940 persons or 3.9%), Portugal (139,765 persons or 3.6%), Netherlands (138,760 persons or 3.6%), Soviet Union (128,680 persons or 3.3%), India (109,660 persons or 2.8%), and Yugoslavia (91,870 persons or 2.4%).

Total immigrant population by country of birth, 1981 Canadian census Immigrant refers to all those who hold or have ever held permanent resident status in Canada, including naturalized citizens.
Rank	Country of birth	Immigrant population	Proportion of immigrants in Canada	Proportion of Canadian population	Notes
—N/a	Canada	3,867,160	100%	16.06%	—N/a
1	United Kingdom	884,915	22.88%	3.67%	Includes England, Wales, Scotland, and Northern Ireland.
2	Italy	386,505	9.99%	1.6%	—N/a
3	United States	312,015	8.07%	1.3%	—N/a
4	Germany	198,215	5.13%	0.82%	—N/a
5	Poland	148,940	3.85%	0.62%	—N/a
6	Portugal	139,765	3.61%	0.58%	—N/a
7	Netherlands	138,760	3.59%	0.58%	—N/a
8	Soviet Union	128,680	3.33%	0.53%	—N/a
9	India	109,660	2.84%	0.46%	—N/a
10	Yugoslavia	91,870	2.38%	0.38%	—N/a
11	Greece	90,070	2.33%	0.37%	—N/a
12	Jamaica	78,165	2.02%	0.32%	—N/a
13	Scandinavia	70,225	1.82%	0.29%	—N/a
14	Hungary	64,735	1.67%	0.27%	—N/a
15	Hong Kong	58,980	1.53%	0.24%	—N/a
16	France	56,175	1.45%	0.23%	—N/a
17	Philippines	55,460	1.43%	0.23%	—N/a
18	Taiwan	54,320	1.4%	0.23%	—N/a
19	China	52,395	1.35%	0.22%	—N/a
20	Vietnam	50,710	1.31%	0.21%	—N/a
21	Czechoslovakia	41,660	1.08%	0.17%	—N/a
22	Trinidad and Tobago	38,655	1%	0.16%	—N/a
23	Guyana	38,060	0.98%	0.16%	—N/a
24	Austria	34,325	0.89%	0.14%	—N/a
25	Haiti	25,865	0.67%	0.11%	—N/a
26	Belgium	25,250	0.65%	0.1%	—N/a
27	Romania	24,350	0.63%	0.1%	—N/a
28	Lebanon	22,595	0.58%	0.09%	—N/a
29	Egypt	21,870	0.57%	0.09%	—N/a
30	Other Southeast Asia	20,965	0.54%	0.09%	—N/a
31	Other West Asia	20,940	0.54%	0.09%	—N/a
32	Other South America	20,295	0.52%	0.08%	—N/a
33	Switzerland	16,955	0.44%	0.07%	—N/a
34	Ireland	16,755	0.43%	0.07%	—N/a
35	Other Caribbean	16,145	0.42%	0.07%	—N/a
36	South Africa	15,860	0.41%	0.07%	—N/a
37	Chile	15,330	0.4%	0.06%	—N/a
38	Pakistan	15,140	0.39%	0.06%	—N/a
39	Australia	14,800	0.38%	0.06%	—N/a
40	Barbados	14,310	0.37%	0.06%	—N/a
41	Spain	12,855	0.33%	0.05%	—N/a
42	Japan	11,910	0.31%	0.05%	—N/a
43	Morocco	11,840	0.31%	0.05%	—N/a
44	Tanzania	11,480	0.3%	0.05%	—N/a
45	Mexico	11,310	0.29%	0.05%	—N/a
46	Israel	11,205	0.29%	0.05%	—N/a
47	Malta	10,585	0.27%	0.04%	—N/a
48	South Korea	10,165	0.26%	0.04%	—N/a
49	Fiji	10,120	0.26%	0.04%	—N/a
50	Kenya	9,225	0.24%	0.04%	—N/a
51	Other East Asia	8,975	0.23%	0.04%	—N/a
52	Laos	8,855	0.23%	0.04%	—N/a
53	Turkey	8,805	0.23%	0.04%	—N/a
54	Uganda	8,640	0.22%	0.04%	—N/a
55	Other Oceania	8,595	0.22%	0.04%	—N/a
56	Other Southern Africa	7,585	0.2%	0.03%	—N/a
57	Argentina	7,235	0.19%	0.03%	—N/a
58	Other Central America	6,035	0.16%	0.03%	—N/a
59	Ecuador	5,835	0.15%	0.02%	—N/a
60	Cambodia	5,595	0.14%	0.02%	—N/a
61	Other East Africa	5,190	0.13%	0.02%	—N/a
62	Other North Africa	5,155	0.13%	0.02%	—N/a
63	West Africa	4,760	0.12%	0.02%	—N/a
64	Other Europe	4,480	0.12%	0.02%	—N/a
65	Brazil	4,340	0.11%	0.02%	—N/a
66	Sri Lanka	4,195	0.11%	0.02%	—N/a
67	Other South Asia	1,630	0.04%	0.01%	—N/a
68	Central Africa	1,105	0.03%	0%	—N/a
69	Other countries	6,740	0.17%	0.03%	—N/a
—N/a	Total immigrants	3,867,160	100%	16.06%	—N/a

== 1971 census ==
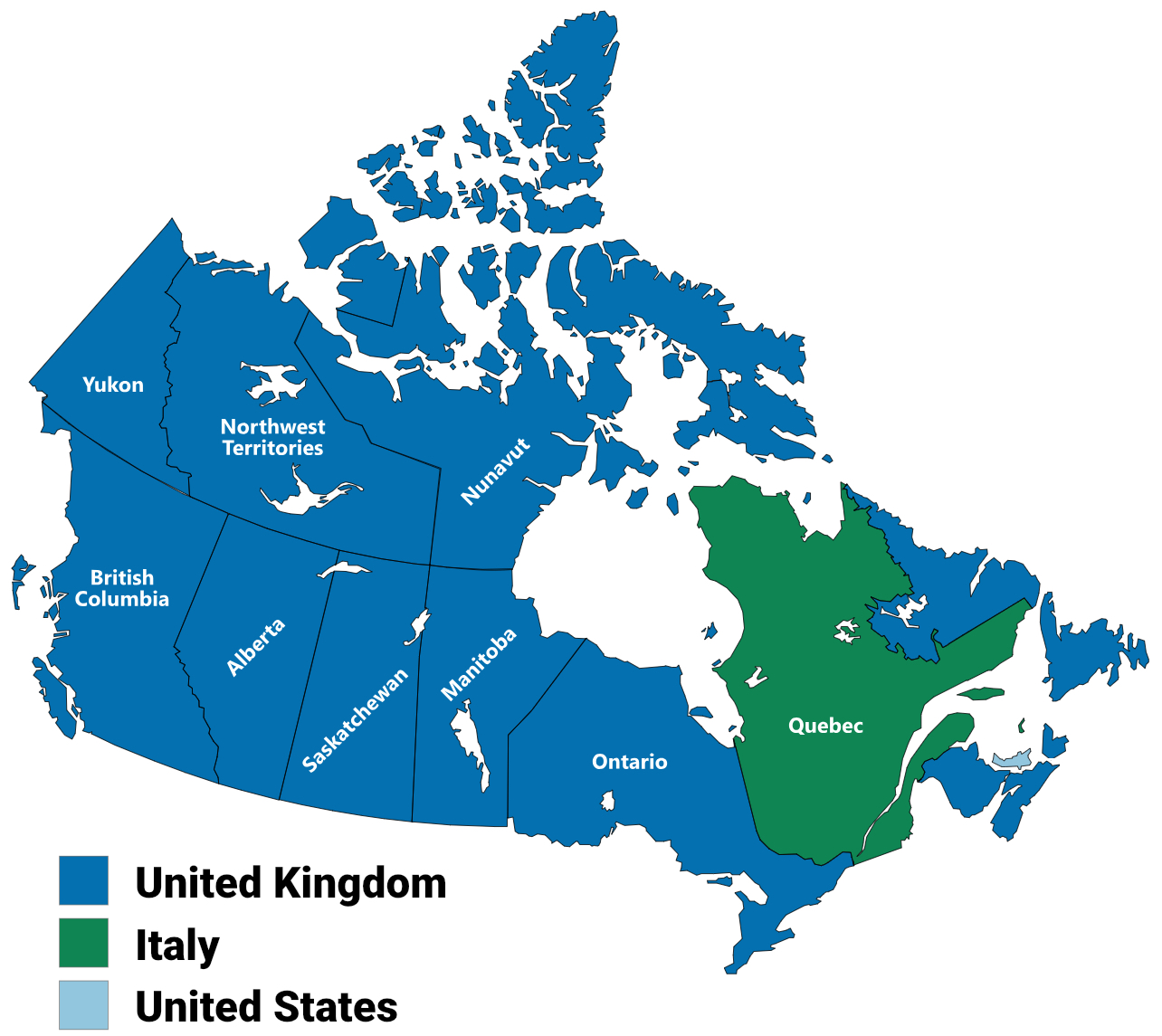
Largest nation of immigrants by province and territory, 1971 census

The 1971 census reported that immigrants comprised 3,295,535 individuals or 15.3 percent of the total Canadian population. Of the total immigrant population, the top countries of origin were United Kingdom (933,045 persons or 28.3%), Italy (385,760 persons or 11.7%), United States (309,640 persons or 9.4%), Germany (211,060 persons or 6.4%), Soviet Union (160,125 persons or 4.9%), Poland (160,035 persons or 4.9%), Netherlands (133,525 persons or 4.1%), Scandinavia (85,140 persons or 2.6%), Greece (78,780 persons or 2.4%), and Yugoslavia (78,285 persons or 2.4%).

Total immigrant population by country of birth, 1971 Canadian census Immigrant refers to all those who hold or have ever held permanent resident status in Canada, including naturalized citizens.
Rank	Country of birth	Immigrant population	Proportion of immigrants in Canada	Proportion of Canadian population	Notes
—N/a	Canada	3,295,535	100%	15.28%	—N/a
1	United Kingdom	933,045	28.31%	4.33%	Includes England, Wales, Scotland, and Northern Ireland.
2	Italy	385,760	11.71%	1.79%	—N/a
3	United States	309,640	9.4%	1.44%	—N/a
4	Germany	211,060	6.4%	0.98%	—N/a
5	Soviet Union	160,125	4.86%	0.74%	—N/a
6	Poland	160,035	4.86%	0.74%	—N/a
7	Netherlands	133,525	4.05%	0.62%	—N/a
8	Scandinavia	85,140	2.58%	0.39%	—N/a
9	Greece	78,780	2.39%	0.37%	—N/a
10	Yugoslavia	78,285	2.38%	0.36%	—N/a
11	Portugal	71,540	2.17%	0.33%	—N/a
12	Hungary	68,490	2.08%	0.32%	—N/a
13	China	57,150	1.73%	0.26%	—N/a
14	Other Asia	55,465	1.68%	0.26%	—N/a
15	France	51,660	1.57%	0.24%	—N/a
16	Africa	45,510	1.38%	0.21%	—N/a
17	India & Pakistan	43,645	1.32%	0.2%	—N/a
18	Czechoslovakia	43,100	1.31%	0.2%	—N/a
19	Jamaica & Trinidad and Tobago	42,050	1.28%	0.19%	—N/a
20	Austria	40,445	1.23%	0.19%	—N/a
21	Ireland	38,490	1.17%	0.18%	—N/a
22	Central America & South America	36,040	1.09%	0.17%	—N/a
23	Other Caribbean	26,040	0.79%	0.12%	—N/a
24	Belgium	25,770	0.78%	0.12%	—N/a
25	Romania	24,405	0.74%	0.11%	—N/a
26	Australia	14,335	0.43%	0.07%	—N/a
27	Switzerland	13,895	0.42%	0.06%	—N/a
28	Spain	10,500	0.32%	0.05%	—N/a
29	Japan	9,485	0.29%	0.04%	—N/a
30	Malta	9,230	0.28%	0.04%	—N/a
31	Other Oceania	5,895	0.18%	0.03%	—N/a
32	Other Eastern Europe	2,045	0.06%	0.01%	—N/a
33	Other Southern Europe	770	0.02%	0%	—N/a
34	Luxembourg	600	0.02%	0%	—N/a
35	Other Western Europe	90	0%	0%	—N/a
36	Other countries	23,490	0.71%	0.11%	—N/a
—N/a	Total immigrants	3,295,535	100%	15.28%	—N/a

== 1961 census ==
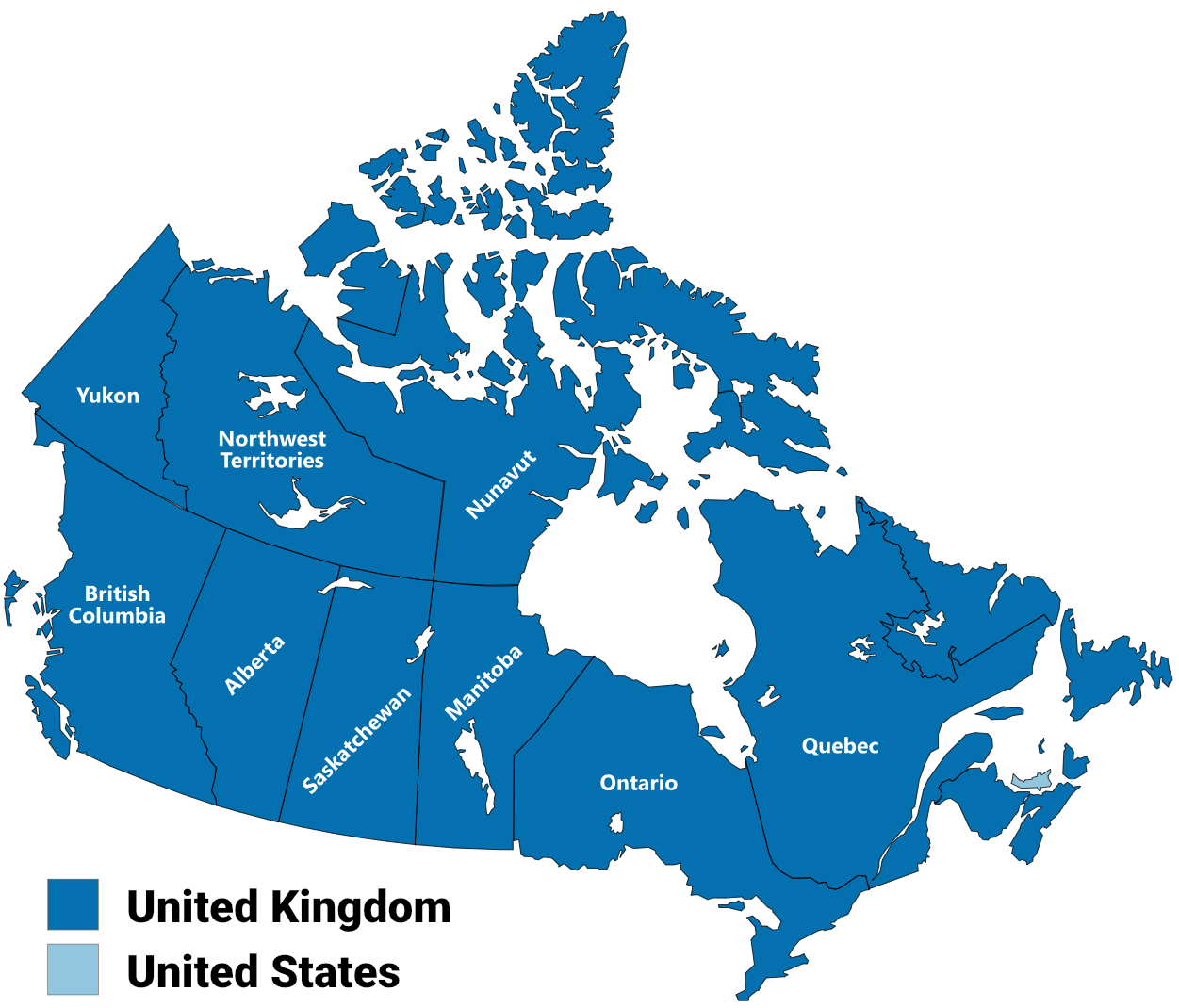
Largest nation of immigrants by province and territory, 1961 census

The 1961 census reported that immigrants comprised 2,844,263 individuals or 15.6 percent of the total Canadian population. Of the total immigrant population, the top countries of origin were United Kingdom (908,127 persons or 31.9%), Soviet Union & Poland (358,120 persons or 12.6%), United States (283,908 persons or 9.9%), Germany & Austria (259,323 persons or 9.1%), Italy (258,071 persons or 9.1%), Netherlands (135,033 persons or 4.8%), Scandinavia (104,083 persons or 3.7%),Ireland (92,477 persons or 3.3%), Hungary (72,900 persons or 2.6%), and Yugoslavia (50,826 persons or 1.8%).

Total immigrant population by country of birth, 1961 Canadian census Immigrant refers to all those who hold or have ever held permanent resident status in Canada, including naturalized citizens.
Rank	Country of birth	Immigrant population	Proportion of immigrants in Canada	Proportion of Canadian population	Notes
—N/a	Canada	2,844,263	100%	15.6%	—N/a
1	United Kingdom	908,127	31.93%	4.98%	England: 638,855 / Scotland: 244,052 / Wales: 23,247 / Other: 1,973
2	Soviet Union & Poland	358,120	12.59%	1.96%	Soviet Union: 186,653 / Poland: 171,467
3	United States	283,908	9.98%	1.56%	—N/a
4	Germany & Austria	259,323	9.12%	1.42%	Germany: 189,131 / Austria: 70,192
5	Italy	258,071	9.07%	1.41%	—N/a
6	Netherlands	135,033	4.75%	0.74%	—N/a
7	Scandinavia	104,083	3.66%	0.57%	Denmark: 30,869 / Finland: 29,467 / Norway: 22,267 / Sweden: 19,338 / Iceland: 2,142
8	Ireland	92,477	3.25%	0.51%	Northern Ireland: 61,588 / Ireland: 30,889
9	Hungary	72,900	2.56%	0.4%	—N/a
10	Yugoslavia	50,826	1.79%	0.28%	—N/a
11	Greece	38,017	1.34%	0.21%	—N/a
12	China	36,724	1.29%	0.2%	—N/a
13	France	36,103	1.27%	0.2%	—N/a
14	Czechoslovakia	35,743	1.26%	0.2%	—N/a
15	Belgium	28,253	0.99%	0.15%	—N/a
16	Romania	27,011	0.95%	0.15%	—N/a
17	Other Europe	22,305	0.78%	0.12%	—N/a
18	Other British Commonwealth	15,808	0.56%	0.09%	—N/a
19	Other Asia	14,240	0.5%	0.08%	—N/a
20	British West Indies	12,363	0.43%	0.07%	—N/a
21	Switzerland	11,381	0.4%	0.06%	—N/a
22	India & Pakistan	9,028	0.32%	0.05%	—N/a
23	Japan	6,797	0.24%	0.04%	—N/a
24	Australia	6,663	0.23%	0.04%	—N/a
25	South Africa	4,025	0.14%	0.02%	—N/a
26	Other countries	16,934	0.6%	0.09%	—N/a
—N/a	Total immigrants	2,844,263	100%	15.6%	—N/a

== 1951 census ==
The 1951 census reported that immigrants comprised 2,059,911 individuals or 14.7 percent of the total Canadian population. Of the total immigrant population, the top countries of origin were United Kingdom (855,797 persons or 41.6%), Soviet Union & Poland (352,766 persons or 17.1%), United States (282,010 persons or 13.7%), Scandinavia (86,557 persons or 4.2%), Ireland (80,795 persons or 3.9%), Germany & Austria (80,291 persons or 3.9%), Italy (57,789 persons or 2.8%), Netherlands (41,457 persons or 2%), Hungary (32,929 persons or 1.6%), and Czechoslovakia (29,546 persons or 1.4%).

Total immigrant population by country of birth, 1951 Canadian census Immigrant refers to all those who hold or have ever held permanent resident status in Canada, including naturalized citizens.
Rank	Country of birth	Immigrant population	Proportion of immigrants in Canada	Proportion of Canadian population	Notes
—N/a	Canada	2,059,911	100%	14.7%	—N/a
1	United Kingdom	855,797	41.55%	6.11%	England & Wales: 627,551 / Scotland: 226,343 / Lesser Isles: 1,903
2	Soviet Union & Poland	352,766	17.13%	2.52%	Soviet Union: 188,292 / Poland: 164,474
3	United States	282,010	13.69%	2.01%	—N/a
4	Scandinavia	86,557	4.2%	0.62%	Norway: 22,969 / Sweden: 22,635 / Finland: 22,035 / Denmark: 15,679 / Iceland: 3,239
5	Ireland	80,795	3.92%	0.58%	Northern Ireland: 56,685 / Ireland: 24,110
6	Germany & Austria	80,291	3.9%	0.57%	Germany: 42,693 / Austria: 37,598
7	Italy	57,789	2.81%	0.41%	—N/a
8	Netherlands	41,457	2.01%	0.3%	—N/a
9	Hungary	32,929	1.6%	0.24%	—N/a
10	Czechoslovakia	29,546	1.43%	0.21%	—N/a
11	China	24,166	1.17%	0.17%	—N/a
12	Yugoslavia	20,912	1.02%	0.15%	—N/a
13	Romania	19,733	0.96%	0.14%	—N/a
14	Belgium	17,251	0.84%	0.12%	—N/a
15	France	15,650	0.76%	0.11%	—N/a
16	Greece	8,594	0.42%	0.06%	—N/a
17	Other Europe	7,619	0.37%	0.05%	—N/a
18	Other Asia	6,740	0.33%	0.05%	—N/a
19	Other British Commonwealth	6,527	0.32%	0.05%	—N/a
20	Switzerland	6,414	0.31%	0.05%	—N/a
21	Japan	6,239	0.3%	0.04%	—N/a
22	Australia	4,161	0.2%	0.03%	—N/a
23	India & Pakistan	3,934	0.19%	0.03%	—N/a
24	British West Indies	3,888	0.19%	0.03%	—N/a
25	South Africa	2,057	0.1%	0.01%	—N/a
26	Other countries	6,089	0.3%	0.04%	—N/a
—N/a	Total immigrants	2,059,911	100%	14.7%	—N/a

== 1941 census ==
The 1941 census reported that immigrants comprised 2,018,847 individuals or 17.6 percent of the total Canadian population. Of the total immigrant population, the top countries of origin were United Kingdom (873,999 persons or 44.3%), United States (312,473 persons or 15.5%), Poland & Soviet Union (279,802 persons or 13.9%), Scandinavia (96,860 persons or 4.8%), Ireland (86,126 persons or 4.3%), Austria & Germany (79,192 persons or 3.9%), Italy (40,432 persons or 2%), Hungary (31,813 persons or 1.6%), China (29,095 persons or 1.4%), and Romania (28,454 persons or 1.4%).

Total immigrant population by country of birth, 1941 Canadian census Immigrant refers to all those who hold or have ever held permanent resident status in Canada, including naturalized citizens.
Rank	Country of birth	Immigrant population	Proportion of immigrants in Canada	Proportion of Canadian population	Notes
—N/a	Canada	2,018,847	100%	17.55%	—N/a
1	United Kingdom	873,999	43.29%	7.6%	England: 615,781 / Scotland: 234,824 / Wales: 19,440 / Lesser Isles: 3,954
2	United States	312,473	15.48%	2.72%	—N/a
3	Poland & Soviet Union	279,802	13.86%	2.43%	Poland: 155,400 / Soviet Union: 117,598 / Lithuanian SSR: 6,804
4	Scandinavia	96,860	4.8%	0.84%	Sweden: 27,160 / Norway: 26,914 / Finland: 24,387 / Denmark: 13,974 / Iceland: 4,425
5	Ireland	86,126	4.27%	0.75%	Also includes Northern Ireland.
6	Austria & Germany	79,192	3.92%	0.69%	Austria: 50,713 / Germany: 28,479
7	(Kingdom of Italy) Italy	40,432	2%	0.35%	—N/a
8	Hungary	31,813	1.58%	0.28%	—N/a
9	China	29,095	1.44%	0.25%	—N/a
10	Romania	28,454	1.41%	0.25%	—N/a
11	Newfoundland	25,837	1.28%	0.22%	—N/a
12	Czechoslovakia	25,564	1.27%	0.22%	—N/a
13	Yugoslavia	17,416	0.86%	0.15%	—N/a
14	Belgium	14,773	0.73%	0.13%	—N/a
15	France	13,795	0.68%	0.12%	—N/a
16	Netherlands	9,923	0.49%	0.09%	—N/a
17	Japan	9,462	0.47%	0.08%	—N/a
18	Greece	5,871	0.29%	0.05%	—N/a
19	Switzerland	5,505	0.27%	0.05%	—N/a
20	India	4,376	0.22%	0.04%	—N/a
21	British West Indies	4,134	0.2%	0.04%	—N/a
22	Other British Commonwealth	3,777	0.19%	0.03%	—N/a
23	(France) Syria–Lebanon	3,577	0.18%	0.03%	—N/a
24	Australia	2,813	0.14%	0.02%	—N/a
25	Other Europe	2,612	0.13%	0.02%	—N/a
26	South Africa	2,109	0.1%	0.02%	—N/a
27	South America	1,472	0.07%	0.01%	—N/a
28	Bulgaria	1,182	0.06%	0.01%	—N/a
29	Turkey	1,093	0.05%	0.01%	—N/a
30	Other Asia	688	0.03%	0.01%	—N/a
31	At Sea	598	0.03%	0.01%	—N/a
32	Armenia	528	0.03%	0%	—N/a
33	Spain	511	0.03%	0%	—N/a
34	Other countries & Not stated	3,512	0.17%	0.03%	Other Countries: 2,040 / Not Stated: 945
—N/a	Total immigrants	2,018,847	100%	17.55%	—N/a

== 1931 census ==
The 1931 census reported that immigrants comprised 2,307,525 individuals or 22.2 percent of the total Canadian population. Of the total immigrant population, the top countries of origin were United Kingdom (1,031,398 persons or 44.7%), United States (344,574 persons or 14.9%), Poland & Soviet Union (305,038 persons or 13.2%), Scandinavia (120,396 persons or 5.2%), Ireland (107,544 persons or 4.7%), Austria & Germany (76,554 persons or 3.3%), Italy (42,578 persons or 1.9%), China (42,037 persons or 1.8%), Romania (40,322 persons or 1.8%), and Hungary (28,523 persons or 1.2%).

Additionally, according to the 1931 census, the Canadian population with at least one foreign born parent (first and second generation persons) numbered 4,744,091 people, forming 45.7 percent of the total Canadian population.

Total immigrant population by country of birth, 1931 Canadian census Immigrant refers to all those who hold or have ever held permanent resident status in Canada, including naturalized citizens.
Rank	Country of birth	Immigrant population	Proportion of immigrants in Canada	Proportion of Canadian population	Notes
—N/a	Canada	2,307,525	100%	22.24%	—N/a
1	United Kingdom	1,031,398	44.7%	9.94%	England: 723,864 / Scotland: 279,765 / Wales: 22,348 / Lesser Isles: 5,421
2	United States	344,574	14.93%	3.32%	—N/a
3	Poland & Soviet Union	305,038	13.22%	2.94%	Poland: 171,169 / Russian SFSR: 114,406 / Ukrainian SSR: 13,759 / Lithuanian SSR: 5,704
4	Scandinavia	120,396	5.22%	1.16%	Sweden: 34,415 / Norway: 32,679 / Finland: 30,354 / Denmark: 17,217 / Iceland: 5,731
5	Ireland	107,544	4.66%	1.04%	Also includes Northern Ireland.
6	Germany & Austria	76,554	3.32%	0.74%	Germany: 39,163 / Austria: 37,391
7	(Kingdom of Italy) Italy	42,578	1.85%	0.41%	—N/a
8	China	42,037	1.82%	0.41%	—N/a
9	Romania	40,322	1.75%	0.39%	—N/a
10	Hungary	28,523	1.24%	0.27%	—N/a
11	Newfoundland	26,410	1.14%	0.25%	—N/a
12	Czechoslovakia	22,835	0.99%	0.22%	—N/a
13	Yugoslavia	17,110	0.74%	0.16%	—N/a
14	Belgium	17,033	0.74%	0.16%	—N/a
15	France	16,756	0.73%	0.16%	—N/a
16	Japan	12,261	0.53%	0.12%	—N/a
17	Netherlands	10,736	0.47%	0.1%	—N/a
18	Switzerland	6,076	0.26%	0.06%	—N/a
19	Greece	5,579	0.24%	0.05%	—N/a
20	India	4,672	0.2%	0.05%	—N/a
21	British West Indies	4,537	0.2%	0.04%	—N/a
22	(Syrian Federation) Syria–Lebanon	3,953	0.17%	0.04%	—N/a
23	Australia	3,565	0.15%	0.03%	—N/a
24	Other Europe	2,887	0.13%	0.03%	—N/a
25	Other (United Kingdom) British Commonwealth	2,304	0.1%	0.02%	—N/a
26	South Africa	2,235	0.1%	0.02%	—N/a
27	Bulgaria	1,467	0.06%	0.01%	—N/a
28	New Zealand	1,434	0.06%	0.01%	—N/a
29	South America	1,296	0.06%	0.01%	—N/a
30	Turkey	921	0.04%	0.01%	—N/a
31	Other Asia	803	0.03%	0.01%	—N/a
32	At Sea	731	0.03%	0.01%	—N/a
33	Armenia	633	0.03%	0.01%	—N/a
34	Spain	572	0.02%	0.01%	—N/a
35	Other countries	1,755	0.08%	0.02%	—N/a
—N/a	Total immigrants	2,307,525	100%	22.24%	—N/a

== 1921 census ==
According to the 1921 census, the Canadian population with at least one foreign born parent (first and second generation persons) numbered 3,903,117 people, forming 44.4 percent of the total Canadian population.

Total immigrant population by country of birth, 1921 Canadian census Immigrant refers to all those who hold or have ever held permanent resident status in Canada, including naturalized citizens.
Rank	Country of birth	Immigrant population	Proportion of immigrants in Canada	Proportion of Canadian population	Notes
—N/a	Canada	1,955,736	100%	22.25%	—N/a
1	United Kingdom	931,820	47.65%	10.6%	England: 686,663 / Scotland: 226,483 / Wales: 13,779 / Lesser Isles: 4,807 / British Isles not stated: 88
2	United States	373,024	19.07%	4.24%	—N/a
3	Soviet Union & Poland	177,716	9.09%	2.02%	Russian SFSR: 101,055 / Galicia: 36,025 / Poland: 29,279 / Ukrainian SSR: 11,357
4	Ireland	93,301	4.77%	1.06%	Also includes Northern Ireland.
5	Germany & Austria	82,801	4.23%	0.94%	Austria: 57,535 / Germany: 25,266
6	Scandinavia	76,951	3.93%	0.88%	Sweden: 27,700 / Norway: 23,127 / Finland: 12,156 / Denmark: 7,192 / Iceland: 6,776
7	China	36,924	1.89%	0.42%	—N/a
8	(Kingdom of Italy) Italy	35,531	1.82%	0.4%	—N/a
9	Newfoundland	23,107	1.18%	0.26%	—N/a
10	Romania	22,779	1.16%	0.26%	—N/a
11	France	19,249	0.98%	0.22%	—N/a
12	Belgium	13,276	0.68%	0.15%	—N/a
13	Japan	11,650	0.6%	0.13%	—N/a
14	Hungary	7,493	0.38%	0.09%	—N/a
15	Netherlands	5,828	0.3%	0.07%	—N/a
16	West Indies	4,393	0.22%	0.05%	British West Indies: 4,270 / Other West Indies: 123
17	Czechoslovakia	4,322	0.22%	0.05%	—N/a
18	Ottoman Empire	4,280	0.22%	0.05%	(Syrian Federation) Syria–Lebanon: 3,879 / Turkey: 401
19	India	3,848	0.2%	0.04%	—N/a
20	Greece	3,769	0.19%	0.04%	—N/a
21	Switzerland	3,479	0.18%	0.04%	—N/a
22	Other Europe	3,183	0.16%	0.04%	—N/a
23	Australia	2,855	0.15%	0.03%	—N/a
24	Other British Empire	2,755	0.14%	0.03%	—N/a
25	Yugoslavia	1,946	0.1%	0.02%	—N/a
26	South Africa	1,760	0.09%	0.02%	—N/a
27	New Zealand	1,085	0.06%	0.01%	—N/a
28	Bulgaria	1,005	0.05%	0.01%	—N/a
29	Other Asia	782	0.04%	0.01%	—N/a
30	At Sea	653	0.03%	0.01%	—N/a
31	Other countries	3,171	0.16%	0.04%	—N/a
—N/a	Total immigrants	1,955,736	100%	22.25%	—N/a

== 1911 census ==
Total immigrant population by country of birth, 1911 Canadian census Immigrant refers to all those who hold or have ever held permanent resident status in Canada, including naturalized citizens.
Rank	Country of birth	Immigrant population	Proportion of immigrants in Canada	Proportion of Canadian population	Notes
—N/a	Canada	1,586,961	100%	22.02%	—N/a
1	United Kingdom	711,360	44.83%	9.87%	England: 510,674 / Scotland: 169,391 / Wales: 8,727 / Lesser Isles: 2,860 / British Isles not stated: 19,708
2	United States	303,680	19.14%	4.21%	—N/a
3	Austria–Hungary	121,430	7.65%	1.68%	Austria: 67,502 / Galicia: 31,373 / Hungary: 10,586 / Bukovina: 10,280 / Bohemia: 1,689
4	(United Kingdom) Ireland	92,874	5.85%	1.29%	Also includes Northern Ireland.
5	Russian Empire	89,984	5.67%	1.25%	—N/a
6	Scandinavia	72,227	4.55%	1%	Sweden: 28,226 / Norway: 20,968 / Finland: 10,987 / Iceland: 7,109 / Denmark: 4,937
7	German Empire & Netherlands	43,385	2.73%	0.6%	Germany: 39,577 / Netherlands: 3,808
8	(Kingdom of Italy) Italy	34,739	2.19%	0.48%	—N/a
9	China	27,083	1.71%	0.38%	—N/a
10	France	17,619	1.11%	0.24%	—N/a
11	Newfoundland	15,469	0.97%	0.21%	—N/a
12	Bulgaria &Romania	9,657	0.61%	0.13%	—N/a
13	Japan	8,425	0.53%	0.12%	—N/a
14	Belgium	7,975	0.5%	0.11%	—N/a
15	Other Europe	5,285	0.33%	0.07%	—N/a
16	Ottoman Empire	4,768	0.3%	0.07%	(Syrian Federation) Syria–Lebanon: 2,907 / Turkey: 1,861
17	India	4,491	0.28%	0.06%	—N/a
18	Australia	2,655	0.17%	0.04%	—N/a
19	Other British Empire	2,626	0.17%	0.04%	—N/a
20	Greece	2,640	0.17%	0.04%	—N/a
21	West Indies	2,089	0.13%	0.03%	British West Indies: 1,878 / Other West Indies: 211
22	South Africa	1,166	0.07%	0.02%	—N/a
23	New Zealand	903	0.06%	0.01%	—N/a
24	At Sea	807	0.05%	0.01%	—N/a
25	Other Asia	523	0.03%	0.01%	—N/a
26	Africa	223	0.01%	0%	—N/a
27	East Indies	147	0.01%	0%	—N/a
28	Other countries	2,731	0.17%	0.04%	—N/a
—N/a	Total immigrants	1,586,961	100%	22.02%	—N/a

== 1901 census ==
Total immigrant population by country of birth, 1901 Canadian census Immigrant refers to all those who hold or have ever held permanent resident status in Canada, including naturalized citizens.
Rank	Country of birth	Immigrant population	Proportion of immigrants in Canada	Proportion of Canadian population	Notes
—N/a	Canada	699,500	100%	13.02%	—N/a
1	United Kingdom	288,390	41.23%	5.37%	England: 201,285 / Scotland: 83,631 / Wales: 2,518 / Lesser Isles: 956
2	United States	127,899	18.28%	2.38%	—N/a
3	(United Kingdom) Ireland	101,629	14.53%	1.89%	Also includes Northern Ireland.
4	Russian Empire & Finland	31,231	4.46%	0.58%	—N/a
5	Austria–Hungary	28,407	4.06%	0.53%	—N/a
6	German Empire & Netherlands	27,685	3.96%	0.52%	Germany: 27,300 / Netherlands: 385
7	Scandinavia	18,388	2.63%	0.34%	Sweden–Norway: 10,256 / Iceland: 6,057 / Denmark: 2,075
8	China	17,043	2.44%	0.32%	—N/a
9	Newfoundland	12,432	1.78%	0.23%	—N/a
10	France	7,944	1.14%	0.15%	—N/a
11	(Kingdom of Italy) Italy	6,854	0.98%	0.13%	—N/a
12	Japan	4,674	0.67%	0.09%	—N/a
13	Belgium	2,280	0.33%	0.04%	—N/a
14	Ottoman Empire	1,579	0.23%	0.03%	(Syrian Federation) Syria–Lebanon: 1,222 / Turkey: 357
15	Switzerland	1,211	0.17%	0.02%	—N/a
16	India	1,076	0.15%	0.02%	—N/a
17	Romania	1,066	0.15%	0.02%	—N/a
18	Australia	991	0.14%	0.02%	—N/a
19	Other (United Kingdom) British Empire	863	0.12%	0.02%	—N/a
20	West Indies	699	0.1%	0.01%	—N/a
21	New Zealand	374	0.05%	0.01%	—N/a
22	At Sea	339	0.05%	0.01%	—N/a
23	Spain & Portugal	270	0.04%	0.01%	—N/a
24	Greece	213	0.03%	0%	—N/a
25	East Indies	188	0.03%	0%	—N/a
26	(South African Republic) South Africa	128	0.02%	0%	—N/a
27	Other countries & Not given	15,647	2.24%	0.29%	Other countries: 818 / Not given: 14,829
—N/a	Total immigrants	699,500	100%	13.02%	—N/a

== 1891 census ==
According to the 1891 census, the Canadian population with at least one foreign born parent (first and second generation persons) numbered 1,768,946 people, forming 36.6 percent of the total Canadian population.

Total immigrant population by country of birth, 1891 Canadian census Immigrant refers to all those who hold or have ever held permanent resident status in Canada, including naturalized citizens.
Rank	Country of birth	Immigrant population	Proportion of immigrants in Canada	Proportion of Canadian population	Notes
—N/a	Canada	647,362	100%	13.39%	—N/a
1	United Kingdom	328,551	50.75%	6.8%	England & Wales: 219,688 / Scotland: 107,594 / Lesser Isles: 1,269
2	(United Kingdom) Ireland	149,184	23.04%	3.09%	Also includes Northern Ireland.
3	United States	80,915	12.5%	1.67%	—N/a
4	German Empire	27,752	4.29%	0.57%	—N/a
5	Russian Empire & Poland	9,917	1.53%	0.21%	Russia: 9,222 / Poland: 695 / Also includes Finland.
6	Newfoundland	9,336	1.44%	0.19%	—N/a
7	China	9,129	1.41%	0.19%	—N/a
8	Scandinavia	7,827	1.21%	0.16%	Includes Sweden–Norway, Denmark, and Iceland.
9	France	5,381	0.83%	0.11%	—N/a
10	Other (United Kingdom) British Empire	3,181	0.49%	0.07%	—N/a
11	(Kingdom of Italy) Italy	2,795	0.43%	0.06%	—N/a
12	At Sea	321	0.05%	0.01%	—N/a
13	Spain & Portugal	169	0.03%	0%	—N/a
14	Other countries & Unknown	12,904	1.99%	0.27%	Other countries: 9,413 / Unknown: 3,491
—N/a	Total immigrants	647,362	100%	13.39%	—N/a

== 1881 census ==
Total immigrant population by country of birth, 1881 Canadian census Immigrant refers to all those who hold or have ever held permanent resident status in Canada, including naturalized citizens.
Rank	Country of birth	Immigrant population	Proportion of immigrants in Canada	Proportion of Canadian population	Notes
—N/a	Canada	609,318	100%	14.09%	—N/a
1	United Kingdom	285,380	46.84%	6.6%	England & Wales: 169,504 / Scotland: 115,062 / Lesser Isles: 814
2	(United Kingdom) Ireland	185,526	30.45%	4.29%	Also includes Northern Ireland.
3	United States	77,753	12.76%	1.8%	—N/a
4	German Empire	25,328	4.16%	0.59%	—N/a
5	Russian Empire & Poland	6,376	1.05%	0.15%	Also includes Finland.
6	Newfoundland	4,596	0.75%	0.11%	—N/a
7	France	4,389	0.72%	0.1%	—N/a
8	Other (United Kingdom) British Empire	2,733	0.45%	0.06%	—N/a
9	Scandinavia	2,076	0.34%	0.05%	Includes Sweden–Norway, Denmark, and Iceland.
10	(Kingdom of Italy) Italy	777	0.13%	0.02%	—N/a
11	At Sea	380	0.06%	0.01%	—N/a
12	Spain & Portugal	215	0.04%	0%	—N/a
13	Other countries & Not Given	13,789	2.26%	0.32%	Other countries: 7,455 / Not Given: 6,334
—N/a	Total immigrants	609,318	100%	14.09%	—N/a

== 1871 census ==
Total immigrant population by country of birth, 1871 Canadian census Immigrant refers to all those who hold or have ever held permanent resident status in Canada, including naturalized citizens.
Rank	Country of birth	Immigrant population	Proportion of immigrants in Canada	Proportion of Canadian population	Notes
—N/a	Canada	593,403	100%	17.02%	—N/a
1	United Kingdom	266,925	44.98%	7.66%	England & Wales: 144,999 / Scotland: 121,074 / Lesser Isles: 852
2	(United Kingdom) Ireland	219,451	36.98%	6.3%	Also includes Northern Ireland.
3	United States	64,447	10.86%	1.85%	—N/a
4	German Empire	24,162	4.07%	0.69%	—N/a
5	Newfoundland & (United Kingdom) Prince Edward Island	7,768	1.31%	0.22%	—N/a
6	France	2,899	0.49%	0.08%	—N/a
7	Other (United Kingdom) British Empire	1,928	0.32%	0.06%	—N/a
8	Scandinavia	588	0.1%	0.02%	Includes Sweden–Norway, Denmark, and Iceland.
9	At Sea	430	0.07%	0.01%	—N/a
10	Russian Empire & Poland	416	0.07%	0.01%	Also includes Finland.
11	(United Kingdom) British Columbia & Manitoba & Northwest Territories	405	0.07%	0.01%	—N/a
12	Spain & Portugal	305	0.05%	0.01%	—N/a
13	(Kingdom of Italy) Italy	218	0.04%	0.01%	—N/a
14	Austria–Hungary	102	0.02%	0%	—N/a
15	Other countries & Not Given	3,359	0.55%	0.1%	Other countries: 1,531 / Not Given: 1,828
—N/a	Total immigrants	593,403	100%	17.02%	—N/a

== 1861 census ==
Total immigrant population by country of birth (1861 censuses of Upper Canada, Lower Canada, New Brunswick, and Nova Scotia) (Note: British North American territory (Upper Canada, Lower Canada, New Brunswick, and Nova Scotia) that comprised the Dominion of Canada following Canadian Confederation in 1867.)
Rank	Country of birth	Immigrant population	Proportion of immigrants in Canada	Proportion of Canadian population	Notes
—N/a	(United Kingdom) Canada	677,967	100%	21.94%	British North American territory (Upper Canada, Lower Canada, New Brunswick, and Nova Scotia) that comprised the Dominion of Canada following Canadian Confederation in 1867.
1	(United Kingdom) Ireland	281,060	41.46%	9.09%	—N/a
2	United Kingdom	269,058	39.69%	8.71%	England & Wales: 135,468 / Scotland: 133,590
3	United States	66,356	9.79%	2.15%	—N/a
4	Other (United Kingdom) British Empire	25,692	3.79%	0.83%	—N/a
5	Germany & Netherlands	23,800	3.51%	0.77%	Also includes Prussia.
6	France	3,421	0.5%	0.11%	—N/a
7	Scandinavia	506	0.07%	0.02%	—N/a
8	At sea	424	0.06%	0.01%	—N/a
9	(Kingdom of Italy) Italy & Greece	233	0.03%	0.01%	—N/a
10	Russian Empire	221	0.03%	0.01%	Also includes Poland.
11	Spain & Portugal	171	0.03%	0.01%	—N/a
12	Austria–Hungary	1	0%	0%	—N/a
13	Other countries & Not given	7,024	1.04%	0.23%	Other countries: 5,216 / Not given: 1,808
—N/a	Total immigrants	677,967	100%	21.94%	—N/a

== 1851 census ==
Total immigrant population by country of birth (1851 censuses of Upper Canada, Lower Canada & New Brunswick)
Rank	Country of birth	Immigrant population	Proportion of immigrants in Canada	Proportion of Canadian population	Notes
—N/a	(United Kingdom) Province of Canada & New Brunswick	535,153	100%	26.28%	Province of Canada territory (Upper Canada & Lower Canada) and New Brunswick.
1	(United Kingdom) Ireland	256,238	47.88%	12.58%	—N/a
2	United Kingdom	193,067	36.08%	9.48%	England & Wales: 97,836 / Scotland: 95,231
3	United States	56,214	10.5%	2.76%	—N/a
4	Other British Empire	10,120	1.89%	0.5%	—N/a
5	Germany & Netherlands	10,097	1.89%	0.5%	—N/a
6	France	1,366	0.26%	0.07%	—N/a
7	Russian Empire	196	0.04%	0.01%	Also includes Poland & Prussia.
8	At sea	177	0.03%	0.01%	—N/a
9	Spain & Portugal	72	0.01%	0%	—N/a
10	Scandinavia	44	0.01%	0%	—N/a
11	(Kingdom of the Two Sicilies) Italy & Greece	43	0.01%	0%	—N/a
12	Austria–Hungary	12	0%	0%	—N/a
13	Other countries & Not given	7,507	1.4%	0.37%	Other countries: 3,787 / Not given: 3,720
—N/a	Total immigrants	535,153	100%	26.28%	—N/a

== See also ==
- Annual immigration statistics of Canada
- Immigration to Canada
- History of immigration to Canada
- Population of Canada by year
