= Birth aboard aircraft and ships =

The subject of birth aboard aircraft and ships is one with a long history in public international law. The law on the subject is complex, because various states apply differing principles of nationality, namely jus soli and jus sanguinis, to varying degrees and with varying qualifications.

== Historical background ==
In the United States, the population born at sea peaked "during the large transatlantic immigration waves of the 1800s and early 1900s, when many migrants arrived in the U.S. seeking a better life after a long journey by ship".

Before 1961, a number of states expressly provided in their laws that births and deaths aboard an aircraft registered to that state are considered to have occurred on national territory, and thus the nationality laws of that territory apply. One such was § 32(5) of the British Nationality Act 1948.

== Frequency and context ==
According to a study published in 2019 and reported by several media outlets, no fewer than 74 babies were born on board aircraft between 1929 and 2018. And the phenomenon seems to have become more frequent in recent decades, a trend that goes hand in hand with the growth in global air traffic.

== Contemporary laws ==
Under the 1944 Convention on International Civil Aviation, articles 17–21, all aircraft have the nationality of the state in which they are registered, and may not have multiple nationalities. The law of the aircraft's nationality is applicable on the aircraft. However, nationality laws of any country already apply everywhere, since it is for each country to determine who are its nationals, so this convention has no effect on nationality laws. The convention does not say that a birth on a country's aircraft is to be treated as a birth in that country for the purposes of nationality.

Under the 1961 Convention on the Reduction of Statelessness, for the purposes of determining the obligations under the convention, a birth on a ship or aircraft in international waters or airspace shall be treated as a birth in the country of the ship or aircraft's registration. However, the convention applies only to births where the child would otherwise be stateless. Since in most cases a child would be covered by one or more countries' jus sanguinis at birth (getting the same citizenship as their parents), this convention rarely comes into play. In addition, there are still very few member states that are party to the 1961 convention.

=== Canada ===
Children born in Canadian airspace are automatically extended Canadian citizenship, but birth in or over international waters is assessed on a case-by-case basis. Various factors are assessed in determining citizenship at birth, parentage being the most important factor. But being born in a Canadian-registered vehicle would establish a connection with Canada which would probably be taken into account, if application was made to have the person declared a Canadian citizen.

=== United States ===
U.S. law holds that natural persons born on foreign ships docked at U.S. ports or born within the limit of U.S. territorial waters are U.S. citizens. An important exception to this rule is children born to people who (in line with the 14th Amendment) are not "subject to the jurisdiction" of the United States, e.g. foreign diplomats accredited with the United States Department of State or invading foreign enemy forces. Despite a common misconception to the contrary, birth on board a U.S.-flagged ship, airliner, or military vessel outside of the 12-nautical-mile (22 km; 14 mi) limit is not considered to be a birth on U.S. territory, and the principle of jus soli thus does not apply.

In addition to the question of a child's citizenship, there is also a question of how to report "Place of Birth" for children born in transit. US State Department guidance instructs that a child born in international waters should have their place of birth listed as "AT SEA", while those born in the territorial waters of any country would list the name of that country. A child born in flight over a region where no country claims sovereignty (eg. international waters or Antarctica) would list their place of birth as "IN THE AIR".

== See also ==
- List of people born at sea
