= Passport Canada =

Independent Canadian government agency

Agency overview
- Dissolved: 1 July 2013
- Superseding agency: Immigration, Refugees and Citizenship Canada
- Type: Special operating agency
- Key document: Canadian Passport Order

Passport Canada (known as the Passport Office prior to June 2006) was an independent, special operating agency of the Government of Canada with bureaucratic oversight provided through Foreign Affairs and International Trade Canada. Passport Canada was responsible for issuing, revoking, withholding, and recovering Canadian passports, and it was the sole issuer of them (except for emergency and temporary passports that may be issued by a Canadian mission abroad).

The agency operated under the auspices of the Canadian Passport Order which defined the agency. Due to its status as a special operating agency, Passport Canada was financed solely through the fees collected for issuing passports and other travel documents. It did not receive direct funding from the federal government.

Passport Canada became defunct on 1 July 2013, after the amended Canadian Passport Order came into effect replacing Passport Canada with Immigration, Refugees and Citizenship Canada (IRCC) as the passport issuing authority on that date. Employment and Social Development Canada (ESDC), through Service Canada, is responsible for the delivery of the passport program on behalf of IRCC. Service Canada delivers in-person passport services in passport offices and at Service Canada Centres in Canada.

== Canadian Passport Order ==
The Canadian Passport Order is an Order in Council made under the authority of the royal prerogative. First passed in 1981, it has been amended several times. Under the previous Canadian Passport Regulations, which the Order superseded, residents of Canada could obtain a passport by completing an application and sending it in by mail to the Department of External Affairs without having to prove their Canadian citizenship.

It specifies who is eligible for a Canadian passport, as well as the procedure and application process for obtaining one. Under the Order, the Governor-in-Council has the authority to revoke or refuse a passport on grounds specified in the Order. A passport may not be refused or revoked on grounds not specified in the Order.

The Order established the Passport Office (later Passport Canada) as a special operating agency to oversee the distribution of passports to Canadian citizens. Following amendments in 2013, Passport Canada was dissolved and responsibilities for issuing Canadian passports were transferred to the Passport Program of Immigration, Refugees and Citizenship Canada.

== Auditor General's Report ==
In April 2005, the Auditor General of Canada Sheila Fraser gave a scathing report on Passport Canada, writing that employees of the agency lack proper security clearance. Prior to the Auditor General's report, Passport Canada had signed a Memorandum of Understanding with Corrections Canada to obtain a full list of inmates' names, as they are ineligible for a passport.

Follow-up reports were issued in 2007—which noted continuing control issues—and 2009—where satisfactory progress was observed, especially in light of the Western Hemisphere Travel Initiative introduced by the United States.

== See also ==
- Canadian Passport
- Canadian nationality law
- Canadian Security Intelligence Service
- Canada Border Services Agency
- Passport
- Five Nations Passport Group
