= Canadian passport =

Passport issued to citizens of Canada

Canadian passport; passeport canadien
- Front cover of a Canadian passport

- The polycarbonate biodata page of a Canadian biometric passport
- Type: Passport
- Issued by: Service Canada Centre of Employment and Social Development Canada; Immigration, Refugees and Citizenship Canada
- First issued: 1862 (letter of request); 1921 (booklet); 1985 (machine-readable passport); 1 July 2013 (biometric); 10 May 2023 (current version)
- In circulation: 27 million (2025)
- Purpose: Identification
- Valid in: Worldwide
- Eligibility: Canadian citizenship
- Expiration: 5 or 10 years after acquisition for adults (age 16 years and older), and 5 years for children under 16
- Cost: Adult (5 years): Regular: CAN$122.50; Express: CA$172.50; Urgent: CA$248.25; Adult (10 years): Regular: CA$163.50; Express: CA$213.50; Urgent: CA$289.25; Child: Regular: CA$58.50; Express: CA$108.50; Urgent: CA$184.25

A Canadian passport (French: passeport canadien) is a passport issued to citizens of Canada. It enables the bearer to enter or re-enter Canada freely; travel to and from other countries in accordance with visa requirements; facilitates the process of securing assistance from Canadian consular officials abroad, if necessary; and requests protection for the bearer while abroad.

All Canadian passports are issued through the Passport Program of Immigration, Refugees and Citizenship Canada (IRCC). Prior to 1 July 2013, Canadian passports were issued through Passport Canada, an independent operating agency of Foreign Affairs and International Trade Canada. Passports are normally valid for five or ten years for persons 16 years of age and older, and five years for children under 16. In 2025, 67% of Canadians had passports, with over 27 million passports in circulation. Although held by individual citizens, all Canadian passports legally remain the property of the Crown and must be returned to the Passport Program upon request.

Canada is a member of the Five Nations Passport Group, an international forum for cooperation between the passport issuing authorities of Canada, Australia, New Zealand, the United Kingdom, and the United States in order to "share best practices and discuss innovations related to the development of passport policies, products and practices".

Historically, the Canadian passport has been a target of counterfeiters and other misuse. Canada began issuing biometric passports to Canadian citizens on 1 July 2013. The newest passport became available on 18 June 2023. It received backlash over the removal of historic national symbols and imagery.

As of 2026, the Canadian passport ranks seventh in the world in terms of the number of destinations that their holders can access without a prior visa according to the Henley Passport Index.

== History ==
The first Canadian passports were issued in 1862 following the outbreak of the American Civil War, when the United States demanded more secure identification from Canadians wishing to cross the border. They took the form of a "Letter of Request" from the Governor General of Canada. These documents remained in use until 1915, when Canadian passports were first issued in the British format, a ten-section single-sheet folder.

The modern form of the Canadian passport came about in 1921. At that time, Canadians were British subjects, and Canada shared a common nationality with the United Kingdom; thus, Canadian passports were issued to those British subjects resident in or connected to Canada. This arrangement ended in 1947, when the Canadian Citizenship Act was granted Royal Assent and the designation of Canadian citizenship was created. Beginning in July the following year, Canadian passports were issued to Canadian citizens only. However, the first page of Canadian Passports still declared that "A Canadian Citizen is a British Subject", as such was a main clause of the Citizenship Act 1946. This would remain until the act was overhauled and replaced by the Citizenship Act 1976, after which the phrase on the first page of Canadian Passports was changed to read: "The bearer of this passport is a Canadian citizen."

Between 1947 and 1970, Canadian citizens could only apply for passports by mail to Ottawa. Requirements were simple, and applicants claiming birth in Canada did not have to provide proof of birth. The relaxed security led to numerous cases of misuse of the passport, which made the need to tighten the application requirements evident. In 1970, the first three Passport Canada offices were opened in Montreal, Toronto, and Vancouver.

The size dimensions of a closed Canadian passport were originally much larger. This changed in the early 1980s in the lead up to the introduction of Machine-Readable Passports (MRP) when the smaller sized booklet was first introduced.

In 1985, the first version of MRPs was issued, in accordance with International Civil Aviation Organization standards. An amended version came into circulation in 1991, with additional security features and more stringent processing requirements. By 1993, a newer version of MRP was introduced, which contained unique features to prevent replication or alteration.

Since 11 December 2001, children have not been included in parents' passports, and passports have been issued for one person only.

In 2002, Passport Canada began to issue an updated version within Canada, which includes the digitally printed photo of the bearer embedded into the identification page of the booklet, holographic images, bar-coded serial number, and a second hidden photo of the bearer that could only be viewed under ultraviolet light. Canadian diplomatic missions abroad adopted this version in 2006. In March 2010, the passport was upgraded to include a new design of the identification page and more anti-counterfeit elements, such as the new colours of Optically Variable Ink and addition of laser perforated number. The cover, watermark, personalization technique and holographic laminate are same with the 2002 version. The 2010 version was also the last revision of MRP prior to the release of e-passports.

In the 2008 federal budget, Jim Flaherty, Minister of Finance, announced that biometric passports (or "e-passports") would be introduced by 2011. A pilot project began in 2009, with ePassports being issued to special and diplomatic passport applicants. The ePassport roll-out was pushed back to 1 July 2013. On the same day, the issuing authority of Canadian passports was shifted from Foreign Affairs and International Trade Canada to Citizenship and Immigration Canada (CIC), now known as IRCC.

A newly designed passport featuring a polycarbonate data page, new security features, and artwork was rolled out in summer 2023.

=== Changes ===
==== Official languages ====
In September 2003, Le Devoir printed a letter calling on Passport Canada to give individual Canadians the choice of which official language appeared first in their passports, English or French. The Passport Office claimed that this was not allowed under international norms, but it was shown that Belgian passport applications asked Belgian citizens which of their country's three official languages (Dutch, French, or German) should appear first in their passports.

==== ePassport ====
In 2008, Passport Canada announced that it would be issuing electronic passports to Canadian travellers starting in 2012. The ePassport will have an electronic chip encoded with the bearer's name, gender, date and place of birth, and a digital portrait of their face.

On 7 April 2010, Passport Canada announced that in 2012, Canada would begin issuing electronic passports, or ePassports, to all its citizens. Passport Canada states that "the use of ePassports will allow Canada to follow international standards in the field of passport security to protect the nation's borders and maintain the ease of international travel that Canadians currently enjoy. At the same time, Passport Canada will start offering the option of a 10-year validity period as well as the current 5-year validity period."

In September 2011, Passport Canada announced that the ePassport would be ready by the end of 2012; however, this was pushed back to 2013 when the organization found significant delay because of an increase in passport applications for revised entry policies to the United States in the late 2000s and a lengthy consultation process was needed to survey public reactions to the new passport changes.

All Canadian passports issued on or after 1 July 2013 have been ePassports.

All ePassports are now issued with 38 pages. From 2013 to 2023 they had 36 pages, and there had previously been a choice of 24 or 48 pages with the machine-readable passports.

==== Proposed online application process ====
In 2015, IRCC (then known as CIC) planned to modify the passport renewal system by integrating the passport issuance platform with its Global Case Management System (GCMS), a consolidated IT system for citizenship and immigration applications. Under the proposed system modelled after New Zealand, passport holders would no longer need to return their old passports to CIC for cancellation, but can instead apply for a new passport online while keeping the old documents before they receive the new ones. Instead of returning the old passports, applicants would be asked to cut the corners of these documents "through an honour system". The new process was expected to be available in November 2015; however, the plan was cancelled in October when the use of GCMS for passport applications was temporarily suspended due to numerous security glitches in the system. IRCC permanently suspended the use of GCMS for passport applications in February 2016 following an internal audit. GCMS will not be used for passport applications until all risks, which include "Passport Program business requirements", are identified and secured.

==== 2023 series ====
On 10 May 2023, the government of Canada announced a new design for the Canadian passport. Printing of the new passport started in summer 2023 and it became available on 18 June 2023.

There was backlash against the removal of historic national and Indigenous symbols in the new passport design. Images commemorating Canadian sacrifices in war, such as the Vimy Ridge Memorial and National War Memorial, as well as iconic Canadians like Terry Fox, women's suffrage activist Nellie McClung, and Billy Bishop were removed from the passport. The Vimy Foundation, the Royal Canadian Legion, and mayor of Terry Fox's hometown, Brad West, released statements voicing their disappointment about the respective removals of images with which they are associated.

Other symbols that were removed include HMCS Sackville, the Grey Cup and Stanley Cup, the Bluenose, Pier 21, the North-West Mounted Police and RCMP, the Last Spike, Centre Block of Parliament, Niagara Falls, Old Quebec, and Cape Spear. Indigenous symbols removed include the Inuit inukshuk, the First Nations' eagle feather, and the Métis infinity symbol. Other people removed include the Fathers of Confederation, Samuel de Champlain 'Father of New France', and Joseph-Elzéar Bernier. Quotes from Sir John A. Macdonald, Sir George-Étienne Cartier, John Diefenbaker, and Sir Wilfrid Laurier were also removed.

The Minister of Immigration, Refugees and Citizenship, Sean Fraser, said feedback received in passport design consultations included a desire to "celebrate our diversity and inclusion", and to "celebrate our natural environment".

There has been criticism that the new passports are prone to bending, risking their acceptability or validity to border personnel. Immigration, Refugees and Citizenship Canada (IRCC) responded that the new passports are more sensitive to heat and humidity due to their manufacturing, but this doesn't affect their functionality.

== Application and issuance ==
Section 6 of the Canadian Charter of Rights and Freedoms states that "every citizen of Canada has the right to enter, remain in and leave Canada." All Canadian citizens are legally entitled to a Canadian passport, which is prima facie proof of Canadian citizenship. Conclusive proof of Canadian citizenship, as dictated by the IRCC, only includes the following documents:

- Canadian citizenship certificate;
- Canadian citizenship card;
- Birth certificate from a Canadian province or territory;
- Naturalization certificate as a British subject in Canada (issued before 1 January 1947);
- Registration of birth abroad certificate (issued between 1 January 1947 and 14 February 1977); and,
- Certificates of retention (issued between 1 January 1947 and 14 February 1977)

Although the provincial or territorial birth certificate is accepted by IRCC as valid proof of citizenship, Section 3(2) of the Citizenship Act declares that a child born in Canada to a diplomatic or consular officer or other representative of a foreign country, or an employee in the service of such person, is not a Canadian citizen if neither parent was a Canadian citizen or Canadian permanent resident at time of the child's birth. Such persons may be issued Canadian passports, as their provincial or territorial birth certificate are considered as proof of citizenship. Under the act, however, they are legally not Canadian citizens even if they hold a valid Canadian passport.

The issuance of passports falls under the Royal Prerogative. They are issued, in the name of the reigning Canadian monarch (as expressed in the passport note), according to the Canadian Passport Order. This Order in Council specifies grounds for which Immigration, Refugees and Citizenship Canada (IRCC) can issue or renew a passport.

=== Requirement to enter Canada ===
Since 10 November 2016, under the new visa regulations all visa-free passport holders (except for U.S. citizens, U.S. nationals and U.S. permanent residents) are required to apply for an Electronic Travel Authorization (eTA) before boarding a flight to Canada. This means there is now a de facto requirement for Canadian citizens to use a Canadian passport when travelling to or transiting through Canada by air, unless a special authorization is obtained within 10 days of travel.

As the eTA is used for the sole purpose of immigration screening for non-Canadian visitors entering Canada on a temporary basis, all Canadian citizens are automatically barred from applying for an eTA. Hence a passport requirement is effectively in place, because a Canadian citizen who travels on a visa-free, non-Canadian passport will be prevented from boarding the commercial flight to Canada unless the passenger can present a valid Canadian passport during check-in.

The only exceptions to this rule are for a Canadian citizen who

- U.S. citizens travelling U.S. passport or with a U.S. permanent resident card, and therefore exempt from the requirement to hold an eTA to enter Canada,
- arrives in a private conveyance or on foot,
- as the holder of a visa-exempt passport, enters Canada by sea or through one of the land ports of entry from the U.S., or
- possesses a special authorization (which is free and available to anyone who has previously held a Canadian passport or Canadian citizenship certificate).

If a Canadian citizen arrives at the Canadian border, whether or not they possess a Canadian passport, they must be allowed to proceed. There is no penalty for Canadians who enter Canada without a Canadian passport, provided they report as required under the Customs Act.

=== Application ===
Canadians in Canada can submit their applications in person through a passport office, a Service Canada location, or can submit their applications by mail. Canadians in the U.S. or Bermuda can apply only by mail. Canadians living in other countries or territories are required to apply through the nearest Canadian diplomatic posts abroad. Expedited services (urgent, express and standard pick-ups) are only available through a passport office in Canada.

=== Guarantor of identity ===
The Canadian passport issuing system is modelled after the United Kingdom, where all first-time passport applications are required to be "countersigned" by a person who has known the applicant for a minimum of 2 years. Australia and New Zealand have similar policies. The use of a guarantor is to serve "as a security measure in the entitlement process and as a point of departure for the future investigation of statements made on the application form".

Rules regarding the eligibility of guarantors were last updated on 12 August 2013. For passport applicants in Canada, only a Canadian passport holder can be a guarantor. For Canadian citizens living abroad who do not have a Canadian guarantor, a non-Canadian guarantor who works in a licensed profession may be used for application, such as a dentist, medical doctor, judge, lawyer, notary public, pharmacist, police officer, veterinarian, or sitting officer for a financial institution.

=== Passport fees ===
As of 31 March 2026, the fee for a standard adult passport issued in Canada is $122.50 for a five-year passport or $163.50 for a ten-year passport. The fee for a five-year passport for a child under 16 is $58.50 if issued in Canada. If issued outside of Canada, the fee is $194.25 for a five-year adult passport, $266.25 for a ten-year adult passport, and $102.50 for a five year child passport. Additional fees are levied for urgent service or replacement of a lost or stolen passport. All fees are payable in Canadian dollars.

Previously (since 1 July 2013), the fee for a standard adult passport issued in Canada was $120 for a five-year passport or $160 for a ten-year passport, and outside of Canada was $190 and $260 respectively. The fee for a five-year passport for a child under 16 was $57 if issued in Canada, and $100 outside of Canada. Starting 31 March 2026, fees are adjusted annually from this baseline for inflation and service delivery costs, in accordance with the Service Fees Act.

=== Refusal and revocation of passports ===
Immigration, Refugees and Citizenship Canada reserves the right to refuse the issuance of a Canadian passport, or revoke a valid Canadian passport under the grounds of national security and criminality. IRCC may revoke a passport or refuse to issue or renew a passport on grounds set out in the Canadian Passport Order, including such grounds as failure to submit a complete application, misrepresentation in obtaining a passport.

In July 2004, Abdurahman Khadr was denied a Canadian passport by Governor General Adrienne Clarkson on the explicit advice of her Foreign Affairs Minister, Bill Graham, who stated the decision was "in the interest of the national security of Canada and the protection of Canadian troops in Afghanistan". The government invoked the Royal Prerogative in order to deny Khadr's passport, as national security was not at that time listed in the Canadian Passport Order as a ground for refusal. Shortly thereafter, on 22 September 2004, section 10.1 was added to the order, which allowed the minister to revoke or refuse a passport due to national security concerns. Khadr sought judicial review of the minister's decision to refuse his passport and, on 8 June of the following year, the Federal Court ruled that the government did not have the power to refuse to issue Khadr's passport in the absence of specific authority set out in the Canadian Passport Order, but stated in obiter dicta that if the order were to be amended, Khadr would likely not be able to challenge the revocation. In 2006, the Minister of Foreign Affairs, then Peter MacKay, again denied Khadr's application, this time invoking section 10.1 of the amended Canadian Passport Order.

Section 10.1 was later challenged in Federal Court by Fateh Kamel, whose passport had also been refused for national security reasons. On 13 March 2008, the Federal Court declared section 10.1 of the Canadian Passport Order to be unconstitutional and therefore invalid, though the court suspended its declaration of invalidity for six months in order to allow the government time to amend the order. The federal government launched an appeal at the Federal Court of Appeal and a ruling handed down on 29 January 2009 overturned the lower court decision. The court unanimously agreed the denial of passport service on national security grounds is in compliance with the Charter of Rights and Freedoms, citing the limitation clause Section One as its main decision point. Kamel launched an appeal in 2009 to the Supreme Court of Canada but the court declined to hear his case and thus ended the legality challenge to the Canadian Passport Order. In 2010, Kamel attempted to re-apply for a Canadian passport but was once again refused by the minister on grounds of national security. He sought judicial review but was dismissed by the Federal Court and subsequently by the Federal Court of Appeal in 2013. Kamel did not appeal the decision of the Federal Court of Appeal to the Supreme Court of Canada.

== Types of passports ==
The other types of Canadian passports and documents issued, excluding the regular passport.

Before 1947, there were two types of passports: those issued to people who were born British subjects (navy blue cover) and those issued to people naturalized as British subjects.

Regular passport (navy blue cover). These documents are issued to citizens for occasional travel, such as vacations and business trips. They contain 38 pages (33 pages available for visa labels and stamps). They can be issued to adults (age 16 years and older) with a validity of 5 or 10 years or children under 16 with a validity of 5 years.

Diplomatic passport (maroon cover): These are issued pursuant to the Diplomatic and Special Passports Order to Canadian diplomats, high-ranking government officials (including lieutenant governors and commissioners of territories), diplomatic couriers, and private citizens nominated as official diplomatic delegates. Immediate family members of the aforementioned individuals (except diplomatic couriers) who reside with them may be also issued diplomatic passports. Since 2009, diplomatic passports have been issued as electronic passports, in preparation of the full implementation of the ePassport program. Per the Diplomatic and Special Passports Order, only the Governor General and Prime Minister and their immediate family members may use their diplomatic passports for all types of travel (i.e. official or personal)

Special passport (green cover): These are issued pursuant to the Diplomatic and Special Passports Order to people representing the Canadian government on official business, including Privy Councillors, Members of Parliament, provincial cabinet members, public servants, citizens nominated as official non-diplomatic delegates and Canadian Forces members who are posted abroad. Since January 2009 special passports have been issued as electronic passports, in preparation of the full implementation of the ePassport program.

Temporary passport (white cover)

These are issued to Canadian citizens outside Canada who require passports but their regular passport application is being processed. This passport contains 8 pages and is valid between six months and one year.

Emergency travel document (light blue and grey gradient cover)

Emergency travel documents are one-use documents issued to Canadians for direct return to their home country, or to the nearest Canadian diplomatic mission where full passport services are offered. The document (which bears similar resemblance to a normal passport) contains details of the person, photo, travel details, and expiry date of the document.

Refugee Travel Document (blue cover)

These documents are issued to refugees in Canada in accordance to the 1951 Convention Relating to the Status of Refugees. Because many refugees are unable to acquire travel documents from their respective state of nationality (from which they have sought asylum) they are eligible to acquire this document so that international travel can be accessible

Certificate of Identity (grey cover)

These documents are issued to individuals in Canada in accordance to the 1954 Convention Relating to the Status of Stateless Persons, which grants individuals who are stateless or permanent residents of Canada to obtain a national passport or travel document.

== Physical appearance ==
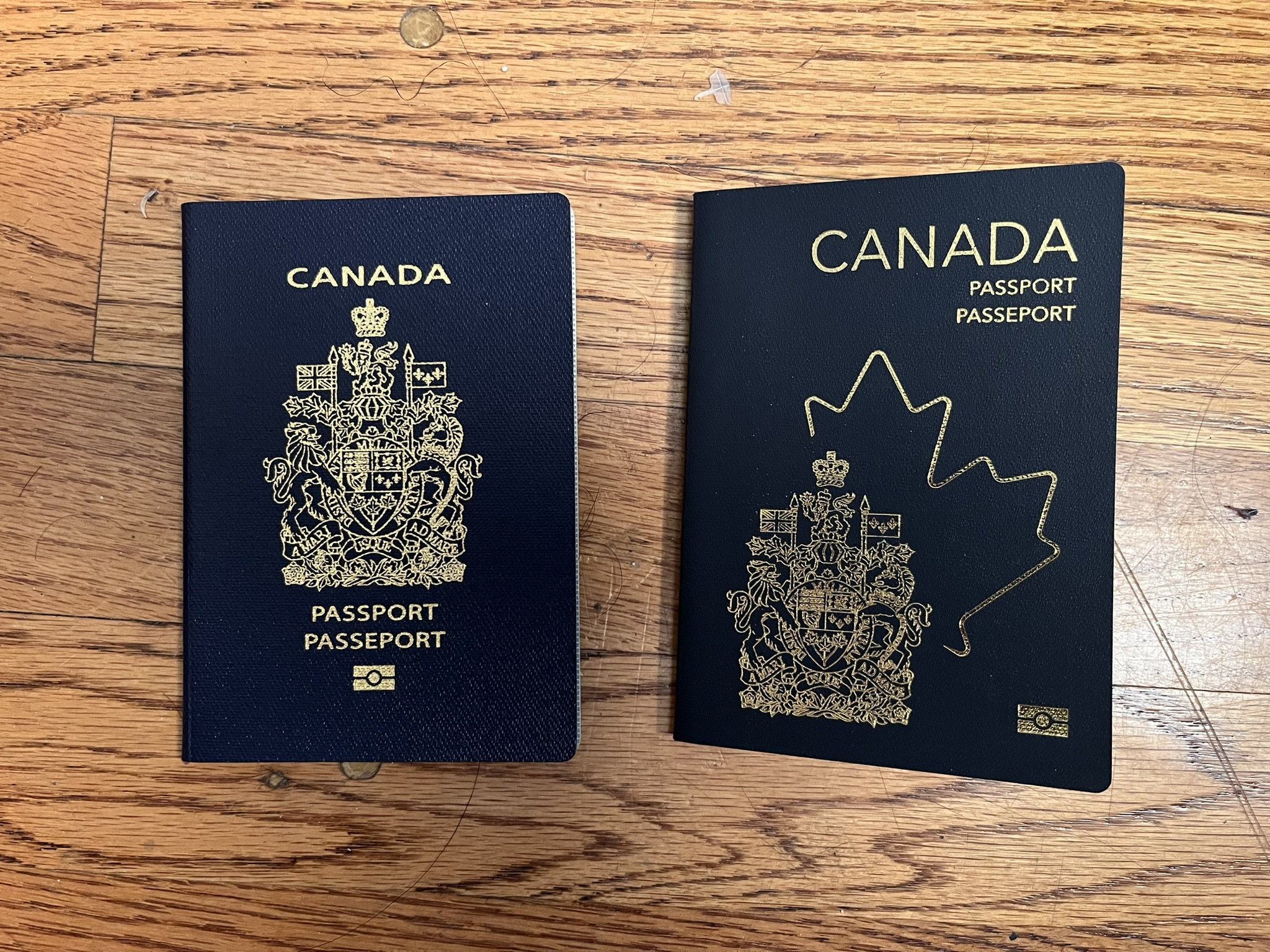
The front cover of the 2013–2023 series (left) beside that of the current series (right).

The cover of regular passports are deep navy blue in colour, with the Royal Coat of Arms of Canada and a Canadian maple leaf emblazoned on the bottom left. The words "CANADA" and "PASSPORT · PASSEPORT" (English and French, Canada's official languages) are inscribed above the coat of arms, with the international e-passport symbol is on the bottom right corner. The 2023 standard passport contains 38 pages, with 33 available for entry/exit stamps and visas, compared to 29 stampable pages in the 2013–2023 series passport. All text is printed in both official languages. The dimensions of a closed Canadian passport conform to the standard ID-3 format, 125 mm × 88 mm (4 15/16 in × 3 7/16 in).

New security features, similar to those on banknotes, have been added with increasing frequency since 2001. Microprinting, holographic images, UV-visible imaging, watermarks, and other details have been implemented, particularly on the photo page. As well, the photo is now digitally printed directly on the paper (in both standard and UV-reactive ink); previously, the actual photo had been laminated inside the document.

=== Data page ===
- Photo of the passport holder
- Type (Type): PP
- Issuing Country (Pays émetteur): listed as "CAN" for "Canada"
- Passport No. (N^{o} de passeport): 1 letter, 6 numbers, and 2 letters
- Surname (Nom)
- Given names (Prénoms)
- Nationality (Nationalité): Canadian nationality marked as "Canadian/Canadienne" in both English and French
- Date of birth (Date de naissance)
- Sex (Sexe): "F" for female, "M" for male, "X" for another gender
- Place of birth (Lieu de naissance): the city and three-letter country code are listed, even if born inside Canada
  - Note: Province or State is required on the application form, if applicable, but is not listed in the passport.
- Date of issue (Date de délivrance)
- Date of expiry (Date d'expiration)
- Authority (Autorité)

The information page ends with the Machine Readable Zone.

==== Signature ====
From 2002 until May 2015, all Canadian passports contained two signature spaces: one is on the data page where a scanned signature is printed along with other personal details, the other is a blank signature block on page 3. After the applicants have received the passport, those over 16 must also sign in the signature block in ink.

Since May 2015, the passport bearer's scanned signature has not been printed on the data page. Adult applicants, however, must still sign page 3 in the passport book when they receive it.

==== Sex ====
On 24 August 2017, the Canadian government announced that it would implement procedures for Canadians who wish to have their sex given as X (unspecified) on Canadian passports, which is one of the three permitted sex designations for machine-readable passports along with M (male) and F (female) specified by the International Civil Aviation Organization. As an interim measure until IRCC became able to print passports with X sex designations, effective 31 August 2017 IRCC offered passports with a note on the observations page indicating that the passport holder should be identified as X rather than the printed sex designation on the data page. Since 11 July 2019, the X designation has been printed on the data page, although travellers are warned that other countries may insist on a male or female designation.

=== Passport note ===
The passports contain a note from the issuing authority addressed to the authorities of all other states, identifying the bearer as a citizen of that state and requesting that they be allowed to pass and be treated according to international norms. The note inside of Canadian passports states, in English:

The Minister of Foreign Affairs of Canada requests, in the name of His Majesty the King, all those whom it may concern to allow the bearer to pass freely, without delay or hindrance, and to afford the bearer such assistance and protection as may be necessary.

And in French:

Le ministre des Affaires étrangères du Canada, au nom de Sa Majesté le Roi, prie les autorités intéressées de bien vouloir laisser passer le titulaire librement, sans délai ou entrave, de même que lui prêter l'aide et la protection dont il aurait besoin.

Passports issued before May 2023 in the name of the late Queen Elizabeth II will remain valid until they expire.

=== Place of birth ===
The place of birth is inscribed under the following format: CITYNAME UTO, where "UTO" is the ISO 3166-1 alpha-3 country code of the country of birth. The first-level administrative country subdivision of birth, such as the Canadian province (or the U.S. state), is not mentioned as a part of place of birth. So Canadian citizens born in Richmond, British Columbia; Richmond, Quebec; or Richmond, Nova Scotia would have the same inscription as place of birth, RICHMOND CAN; a Canadian citizen born in Portland, Maine, or Portland, Oregon, would both have PORTLAND USA. Exceptions to this format are listed below.

A passport applicant may request, in writing, that IRCC not list the place of birth (city and country)—or country of birth—on their data page, by filling out PPTC 077. The applicant must indicate his or her awareness that omitting this information could cause difficulties at international entry points or when applying for visas.

==== Hong Kong, Macau, and Taiwan ====
In response to the Chinese government's modification of requirements for the issuance of visas to Canadian citizens born in Hong Kong, Macau, or Taiwan, Canadian passports issued to Canadians born in Hong Kong, Macau, or Taiwan are now issued only with the place of birth and not the three-letter country code. Chinese visas will no longer be issued to Canadian passport holders whose place of birth is inscribed as Hong Kong HKG, Macau MAC, or TWN.

==== Jerusalem and Palestine ====
Since April 1976, the policy has been that Canadian citizens born in Jerusalem have their birthplace identified only by the city's name, with no national designation, due to the unresolved legal status of Jerusalem. However, Canadian citizens born prior to 14 May 1948 may have their birthplace identified as Palestine if they were born in what was the British Mandate of Palestine (including Jerusalem).

== Misuse ==
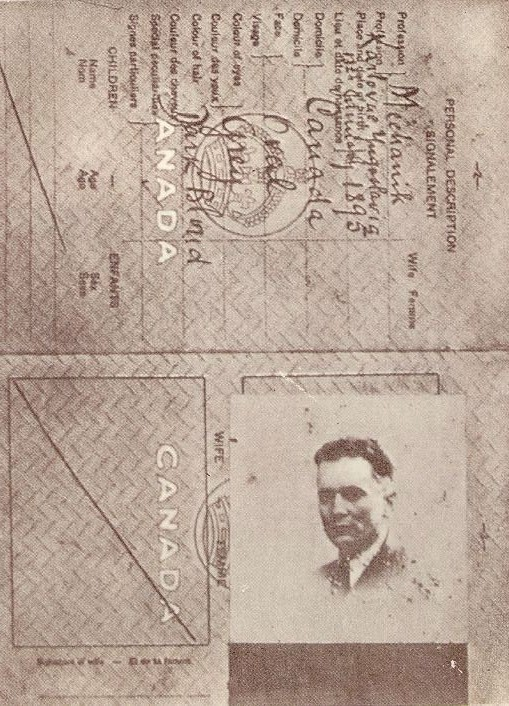
Yugoslav communist revolutionary Josip Broz Tito counterfeit Canadian passport under the name "Spiridon Mekas" used for returning to Yugoslavia from Moscow, 1939

Historically, the Canadian passport has been a target of counterfeiters, criminals, fugitives, and agents of foreign governments. The reasons for such high number of misuses include the relative lax issuance process, the lack of anti-counterfeit security features in early non-MRP versions, the Canadian passport's high number of visa-free countries, the general unassuming nature of the country and its citizens, and access to the United States.

As of 2015, a fake or altered Canadian passport could cost as much as US$3,000 on the black market, almost three times higher than fake or altered EU passports at the time. In 2014, CBC News wrote that "criminals are willing to spend $5,000 to $20,000" for a genuine Canadian passport "issued under an assumed name."

Noteworthy incidents include:

- In 1940, Ramón Mercader, a Spanish national, travelled to Mexico City on a fraudulent Canadian passport to assassinate Leon Trotsky.
- In 1961, KGB officer Konon Molody used a fraudulently obtained passport of deceased Canadian Arnold Lonsdale. Using this identity he engaged in espionage activities in the United Kingdom.
- In 1968, James Earl Ray, the man who assassinated Martin Luther King, Jr., used a Canadian passport, which was obtained with a forged baptismal certificate in the name of "Ramon George Sneyd", to temporarily escape capture following his completed assassination. He was in possession of two Canadian passports at the time of his arrest at London Heathrow Airport. Before Ray's arrest, he was able to turn his passport in, which had incorrectly spelled his fake last name as "Sneya", to the Canadian Embassy in Portugal, for a replacement under his correct alias. The arrest of Ray triggered an investigation launched by the Royal Commission on Security in 1969, which recommended much more stringent application requirements and the establishment of Passport Canada offices.
- In 1973, Mossad agents in Norway accidentally killed a waiter in Lillehammer in the mistaken belief that he was a senior operative for Black September. The use of false Canadian passports by the killers prompted a diplomatic crisis in relations between Canada and Israel, resulting in a commitment by Israel not to misuse Canadian passports in the future. It also resulted in a redesign of the Canadian passport to improve its security features.
- In 1997, Israeli secret service personnel again botched an assassination bid while using Canadian passports. The attempt against Khaled Mashal in Jordan resulted in the arrest of the would-be killers. The Foreign Affairs Minister Lloyd Axworthy eventually received an apology and a written notification by the Israeli government, assuring that the Mossad would desist from using Canadian passports.
- Ahmed Ressam, the Algerian al-Qaeda Millennium Bomber who attempted to blow up Los Angeles International Airport on New Year's Eve 1999/2000, evaded deportation by Canada and travelled freely to and from Canada by using a Canadian passport he obtained in March 1998 by submitting a fraudulent baptismal certificate; he used a stolen blank certificate, filling it in with a fictitious name.
- A Russian spy involved in the Illegals Program used a Canadian passport to travel to the United States to deliver payment to Russian sleeper agents. The passport was issued to a man known as Christopher Metsos. However, following the public revelation of the spy ring in 2010, Passport Canada revoked the document, saying it had been issued by the Canadian High Commission in Johannesburg, South Africa to a man assuming the identity of a deceased Canadian child.
- The TV show The Americans was inspired by the 2010 FBI bust of Elena Vavilova and Andrey Bezrukov, both of whom held Canadian passports under the names Tracey Foley and Donald Heathfield. Their exposure put their two Canadian-born sons into a legal battle for Canadian citizenship.

While not a case of misuse as it was conducted with secret approval of the Canadian government, six American diplomats were smuggled out of Iran using authentic Canadian passports containing forged Iranian visas in 1980.

== Visa requirements map ==
Visa requirements for Canadian citizens Canada Visa not required Visa on arrival Visa on arrival or eVisa eVisa or online payment required Visa required prior to arrival

Visa requirements for Canadian citizens are administrative entry restrictions by the authorities of other states placed on citizens of Canada. According to the 2026 Henley Passport Index, holders of a Canadian passport can visit 182 countries and territories without a visa or with a visa on arrival, ranking the Canadian passport 7th in the world.

=== Visa-free access to the United States ===
Prior to 2007, Canadians could enter the United States by presenting a birth certificate (or other proof of Canadian citizenship) along with a form of photo identification (such as a driver's licence). In many cases United States border agents would accept a verbal declaration of citizenship.

Under the United States Western Hemisphere Travel Initiative, since 23 January 2007, all Canadians entering the United States via air have been required to present a valid passport or NEXUS card. Since 1 June 2009, the United States has required all Canadian citizens (16 years or older) to present a passport, NEXUS card, enhanced driver's licence, or Free and Secure Trade (FAST) card to enter the U.S. via land or water.

In most circumstances, Canadian citizens do not require visitor, business, transit or other visas to enter the United States, either from Canada or from other countries. Moreover, Canadian citizens are generally granted a stay in the U.S. for up to six months at the time of entry. Visa requirements only apply to Canadians who fall under visa categories, and they must apply for a visa before entry in the same manner as other nationalities:

- E (investors)
- K (fiancé(e)s or spouses and their children of U.S. citizens)
- V (spouses and children of Lawful Permanent Residents)
- S (informants)
- A (Canadian government officials travelling on official business),
- G (Canadian diplomats working for international organizations in the U.S.)
- NATO (Canadians working specifically for the NATO)
- Canadians intending to settle permanently in the United States require Immigrant Visas

Canadian students are exempted from the visa requirements if they hold a valid form I-20 or DS-2019 and have paid their SEVIS registration fees, which enables them to travel to the U.S. under F-1 or J-1 statuses.

==== Lawfully working in the United States ====
Under the United States–Mexico–Canada Agreement (USMCA), Canadian citizens can legally work in the U.S. under simplified procedure, known as TN status, if their professions are under USMCA regulations and they have a prearranged full-time or part-time job with a U.S. employer. Obtaining TN status does not involve getting a physical visa, instead the applicant is required to apply and receive TN status with U.S. Customs and Border Protection (CBP) at a U.S. port of entry. The TN status is good for three years once approved and can be renewed indefinitely if working for the same employer, however it may be reviewed and possibly revoked each time the applicant enters the U.S. TN status also does not facilitate the process of obtaining lawful U.S. permanent residency and cannot be used to live in the U.S. permanently.

Canadians who want to work in the U.S. with intention to immigrate to the U.S., or who are ineligible for TN status, can also work under the H-1B status. Unlike other nationalities, they are exempted from obtaining the physical visa from a U.S. embassy or consulate. Apart from the visa exemption, other procedures are the same with all foreign nationals.

==== First Nations ====
Under the Jay Treaty signed by the U.S. and Great Britain in 1794, all First Nations born in Canada are entitled to freely enter the U.S. for employment, education, retirement, investing, or immigration. In order to qualify, all eligible persons must provide documentation of their First Nations background at the port of entry. The documentation must be sufficient to show the bearer is "at least 50% of the American Indian race".

== Foreign travel statistics ==
The following data from the Statistics Canada National Travel Survey estimate the number of visits made by Canadian residents to most-visited countries in the year 2025.

Destination	Number of visits (thousands)
United States	23,096
Mexico	2,662
Bahamas	188
Barbados	113
Cuba	706
Dominican Republic	984
Jamaica	203
Argentina	52
Brazil	138
Colombia	79
Costa Rica	305
Panama	31
Peru	66
Austria	146
Belgium	113
Croatia	135
Czech Republic	122
Denmark	67
France	977
Germany	270
Greece	332
Hungary	54
Iceland	83
Ireland	213
Italy	805
Netherlands	248
Norway	52
Poland	56
Portugal	571
Spain	580
Sweden	35
Switzerland	155
Turkey	99
United Kingdom	878
Morocco	137
South Africa	39
China (excluding Hong Kong)	617
Hong Kong	283
India	248
Indonesia	39
Japan	695
Philippines	187
Singapore	119
South Korea	149
Taiwan	146
Thailand	124
United Arab Emirates	92
Viet Nam	92
Australia	101

== See also ==
- Canadian Passport Order
- Canadian nationality law
- Visa requirements for Canadian citizens
- Visa policy of Canada
- List of diplomatic missions of Canada
- Five Nations Passport Group
