= Visa policy of Canada =

Visitors to Canada must obtain a visa from one of the Canadian diplomatic missions unless they are citizens from one of the visa-exempt countries.

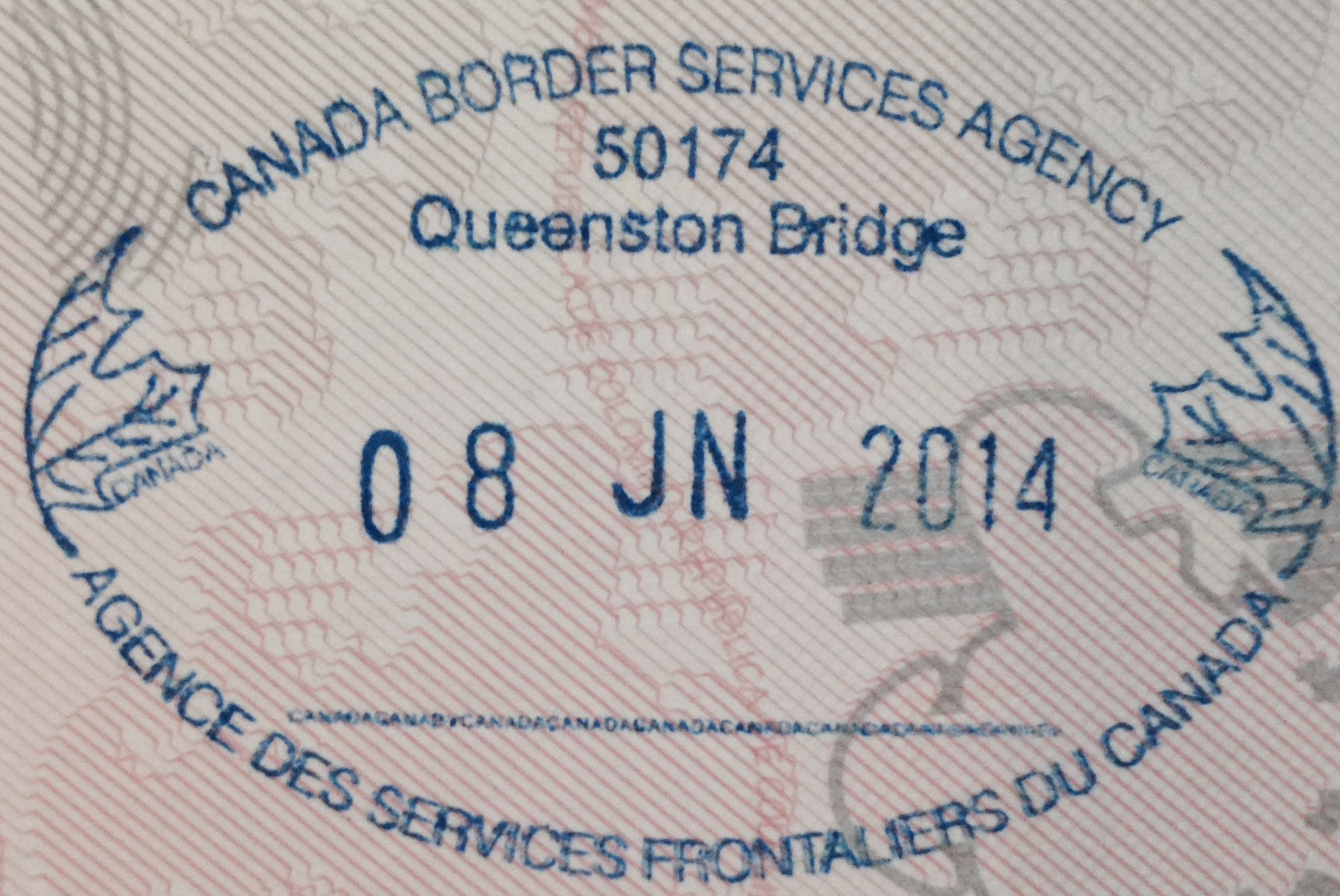
Entry passport stamp for Canada issued to a citizen of Colombia by the Canada Border Services Agency at Lewiston–Queenston Border Crossing in 2014.

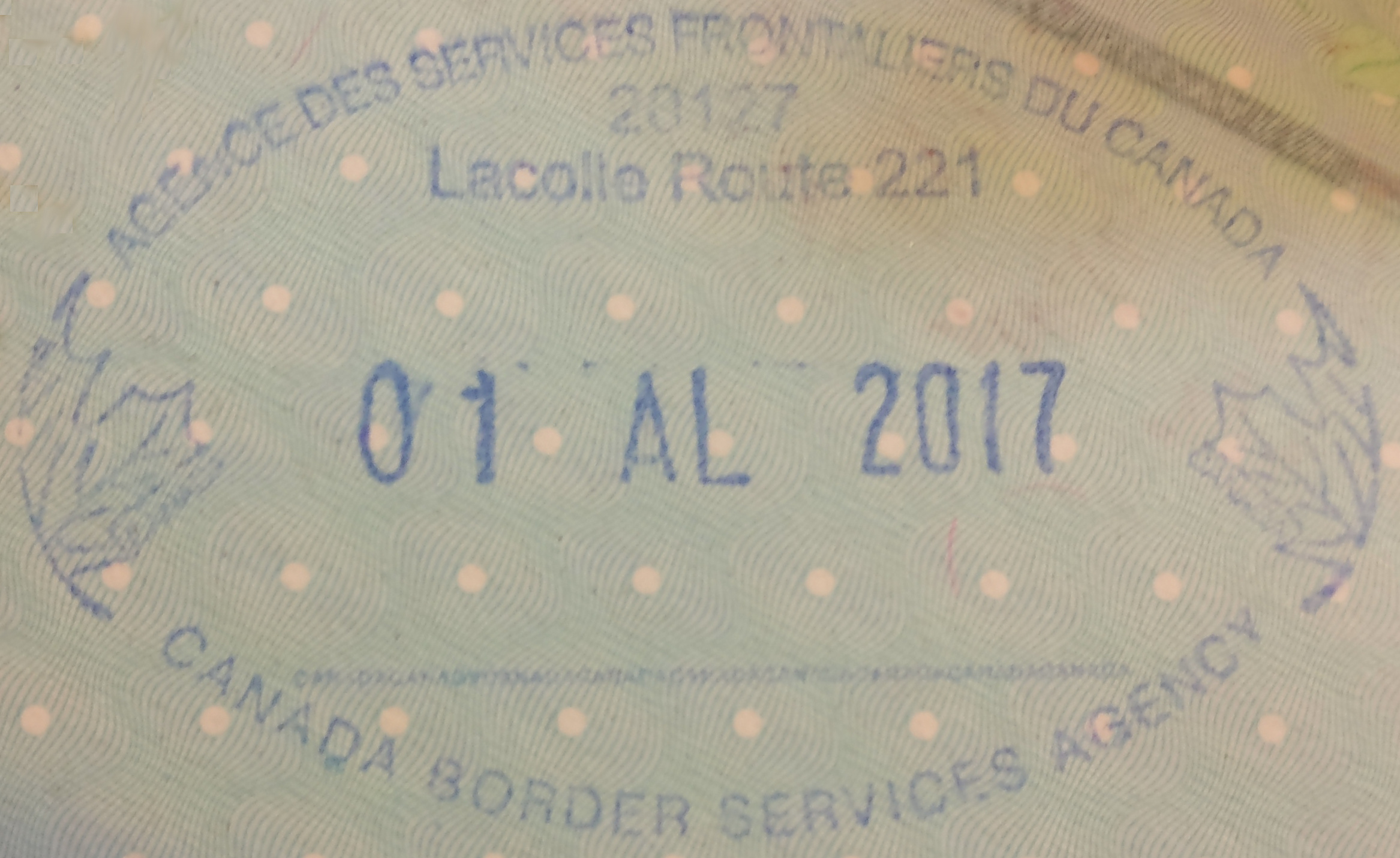
Entry passport stamp for Canada issued to a citizen of Slovakia at Overton Corners–Lacolle 221 Border Crossing in 2017 with the French language first.

All visa-exempt travellers to Canada (except United States citizens and permanent residents) have been required to obtain an Electronic Travel Authorization (eTA) when arriving in Canada by air since 10 November 2016. Travellers were able to apply early as of 1 August 2015.

Applications of visitor visas, work permits, study permits and certain types of permanent residency can be submitted online. However, such applicants must provide their biometrics (photograph and fingerprints) as a part of their application process. Depending on the country by which the passport was issued, a visa application may have to be submitted at a visa application centre at a Canadian diplomatic mission.

== Visa policy map ==
Visa policy of Canada Canada Visa not required, eTA not required (6 months) eTA required for travel by air, not required by land or sea. For travel by sea from Saint Pierre and Miquelon, an eTA is still required (6 months) Visitors who held a Canadian visa within the last 10 years or currently hold a valid U.S. non-immigrant visa do not need a visa for air travel, but an eTA is required. For travel by land or sea, a visa is required Visa required

== Visa exemption ==
Holders of ordinary passports issued by the following countries and territories are able to visit Canada without a visa for a period of up to 6 months. They are required to obtain an eTA if they arrive by air, except for U.S. citizens, U.S. permanent residents, and citizens of France residing in Saint Pierre and Miquelon arriving directly from the territory, who are exempt from the eTA requirement and are barred from applying for an eTA. Citizens of certain countries must arrive by air when not holding a Canadian visa.

Visitors are eligible if they are in good health, can convince an immigration officer that they have ties (job, home, financial assets or family) that will take them back to their home country and have enough money for their stay. In some cases a medical exam or a letter of invitation may be required. Immigration officials have the discretion to limit the duration that visitors may enter the country as well as impose additional conditions.

- All European Union member states (Note: For Romanian citizens, the visa exemption is only applicable to holders of biometric passports.)
- All European Free Trade Association member states
- Andorra
- Australia
- Bahamas
- Barbados
- Brunei
- Chile
- Hong Kong (Note: For holders of Hong Kong Special Administrative Region passports.)
- Israel (Note: For holders of national Israeli passports only.)
- Japan
- Monaco
- New Zealand
- Papua New Guinea
- Qatar
- Samoa
- San Marino
- Singapore
- Solomon Islands
- South Korea
- Taiwan (Note: For holders of ordinary passports issued by the Ministry of Foreign Affairs in Taiwan that include their national identification number.)
- United Arab Emirates
- United Kingdom (Note: For British citizens; British Overseas Territories citizens of Anguilla, Bermuda, British Virgin Islands, Cayman Islands, Falkland Islands, Gibraltar, Montserrat, Pitcairn Islands, Saint Helena, and Turks and Caicos Islands; British Nationals (Overseas); British subjects with right of abode in the United Kingdom; and British Overseas citizens readmissible to the United Kingdom.)
- United States (Note: For U.S. nationals holding any proof of nationality; and U.S. permanent residents holding a green card or a valid alien documentation identification and telecommunication (ADIT) stamp, in addition to a valid passport, U.S. re-entry permit or U.S. refugee travel document.)
- Vatican City

Date of visa changes
- Unknown: Andorra, Cyprus, Liechtenstein, Portugal, Switzerland, Vatican
- Australian, Barbados, British, Irish, New Zealand, Papua New Guinean, Samoa, Singaporean, Solomon Islands and United States citizens have never needed a visa to gain access to Canada

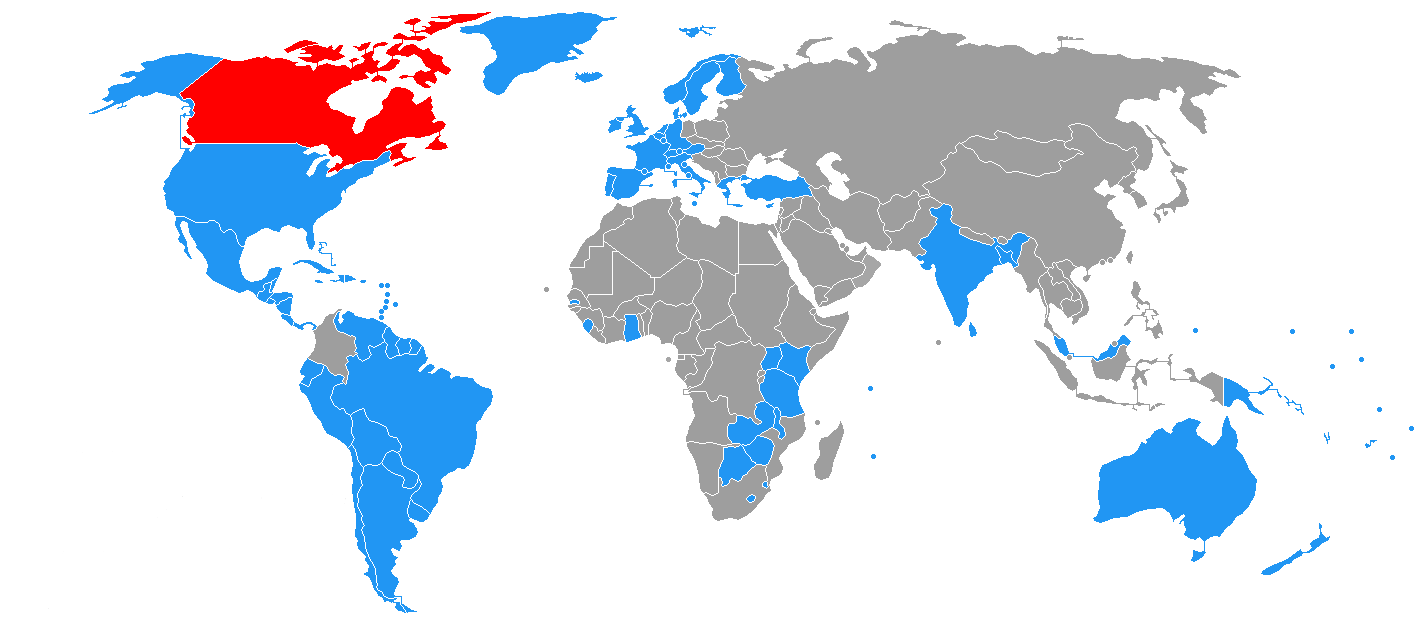
Visa policy of Canada in March 1978 Canada Visa free access

- February 1949: Turkey (cancelled in 1987)
- 1 July 1949: Sweden
- 15 October 1949: Denmark
- 1 December 1949: Belgium and Luxembourg
- 1 January 1950: Netherlands
- 1 April 1950: Norway
- 1 May 1950: France?
- 15 April 1952: Monaco?
- 9 November 1952: Italy
- 1 May 1953: Germany?
- 1956: Austria
- 1 January 1959: Finland
- 30 October 1959: Greece (?)
- 25 January 1960: Spain (?)
- 1 November 1962: Iceland
- 15 November 1962: San Marino
- 20 September 1964: Japan
- 9 March 1984: Israel
- 1 November 1984: Brunei
- 1 May 1994: South Korea
- 1 August 1995: Slovenia
- 1 July 1997: Hong Kong
- 27 September 2006: Estonia
- 31 October 2007: Czech Republic (resumed), Latvia
- 29 February 2008: Hungary (resumed), Lithuania, Poland and Slovakia
- 28 March 2009: Croatia
- 22 November 2010: Taiwan
- 14 November 2013: Czech Republic (resumed)
- 22 November 2014: Chile (resumed)
- 1 December 2016: Mexico (resumed)
- 1 December 2017: Bulgaria and Romania
- 5 June 2018: United Arab Emirates
- 25 November 2025: Qatar

Cancelled:

- N/A: South Africa
- 28 September 1978: Cuba, Ecuador, El Salvador, Ghana and Uganda
- 1 December 1978: Iran
- 20 December 1979: Chile (was resumed on 1 February 1995)
- 25 September 1980: Haiti
- 15 October 1981: India
- 7 September 1983: Bangladesh and Sri Lanka
- 14 March 1984: Guatemala, Guyana, Jamaica and Peru
- 21 November 1985: Dominican Republic
- 17 July 1986: Portugal (was resumed)
- 7 January 1987: Gambia, Sierra Leone, Mauritius, Tanzania, Turkey
- 6 July 1987: Brazil
- 18 September 1987: Bolivia and Honduras
- 4 December 1987: Fiji
- 7 September 1988: Panama
- 28 November 1988: Nicaragua
- 11 December 1988: Trinidad and Tobago
- 6 August 1990: Argentina and Kenya
- 16 May 1991: Tonga
- 4 May 1992: Belize, Lesotho, Malawi, Paraguay, Seychelles, Suriname, Uruguay and Zambia
- 1 August 1995: Venezuela
- 5 June 1996: Chile (was resumed in 2014)
- 8 October 1997: Czech Republic (was resumed in 2007 until 13 July 2009)
- 5 December 2001: Dominica, Grenada, Hungary (was resumed in 2008), Kiribati, Nauru, Tuvalu, Vanuatu, Zimbabwe
- 5 September 2002: Saudi Arabia
- 24 September 2002: Malaysia
- 11 May 2004: Costa Rica
- 13 July 2009: Czech Republic (was resumed in 2013) and Mexico (was resumed in 2016 until 29 February 2024)
- 13 September 2012: Botswana, Eswatini, Namibia, Saint Lucia, and Saint Vincent and the Grenadines
- 22 November 2014: Saint Kitts and Nevis
- 27 June 2017: Antigua and Barbuda
- 29 February 2024: Mexico

Allowed stay

On entry, Canada Border Services Officers (BSO) stamp passports or travel documents and visitors are granted a stay of 6 months from the date of entry. If a specific date was written on the stamp, however, the visitor must leave Canada before that date. Visitors wishing to extend their status date must apply 30 days before it expires.

Inclusion criteria

In order to be added to the visa waiver list a country has to fulfil about 40 conditions, grouped into 7 categories:

- socio-economic conditions
- immigration issues
- travel document integrity
- safety and security issues
- border management
- human rights issues
- bilateral considerations.

The decision is made by analyzing all of the criteria in an overall review instead of a checklist so there is a certain level of flexibility.

=== Electronic Travel Authorization (eTA) ===
In December 2013, the Canadian government announced intention to introduce a system named Electronic Travel Authorization (eTA), similar to the U.S. Electronic System for Travel Authorization (ESTA), as part of an action plan to establish a common approach to screening visa-exempt foreign nationals. The Privacy Commissioner of Canada expressed concern over the plan. Travellers were able to apply as early as August 1, 2015 and the scheme went into full effect on November 10, 2016.

Visitors can apply through the website of Immigration, Refugees and Citizenship Canada (IRCC) and are required to pay a cost recovery fee of CA$7. Visitors have to provide biographic details, passport and background information which includes additional citizenship, available funds, employment information and contact details. Applicants also have to answer questions about their health, immigration history and on any convictions they may have. Unlike a visa application, there are fewer questions in general and no question on their detailed travel plan. Following a risk assessment of the applicant, an eTA valid for multiple entries to Canada over a period of up to five years or until the passport's expiration date, whichever is shorter, should be issued.

==== Visa-exempt citizens ====
An eTA is mandatory for all visa-exempt citizens when arriving by air (except for U.S. citizens and U.S. permanent residents). However, an eTA is not necessary for overland entry via one of the land border crossings with the U.S. or entry by sea, except entry by sea (excluding cruise ships) from Saint Pierre and Miquelon, in which case an eTA is still required. Following arrival at a port of entry, admission into Canada is given at the discretion of the Canada Border Services Agency.

==== Substitute Visa ====
Citizens of the following countries who have held a Canadian visa in the past 10 years or who hold a valid non-immigrant U.S. visa may apply for an eTA, instead of a visa, to travel to Canada by air. However, a valid Canadian visa is still required for them to travel to Canada by land or sea.

- Antigua and Barbuda
- Argentina
- Brazil
- Costa Rica
- Indonesia
- Malaysia
- Mexico
- Morocco
- Panama
- Philippines
- Saint Kitts and Nevis
- Saint Lucia
- Saint Vincent and the Grenadines
- Seychelles
- Thailand
- Trinidad and Tobago
- Uruguay

Most people using a UN refugee travel document to travel to Canada need a visitor visa.

==== eTA exemption for foreign nationals ====
The following foreign citizens are exempted from obtaining an eTA:

- holders of a valid Canadian refugee travel document;
- French citizens who reside in Saint Pierre and Miquelon and enter Canada directly from the territory;
- holders of valid Canadian visas;
- visitors, students or workers with valid temporary resident status who return after visiting only the United States or St. Pierre and Miquelon, provided that they return before the end of their authorized period of stay;
- Foreign nationals who transit through a Canadian airport under the Transit Without Visa Program (TWOV) or China Transit Program (CTP);
- Visiting armed force members from a designated state;
- Air Crew members;
- Persons who are conducting inspections of flight operation procedures or cabin safety of a commercial air carrier operating international flights and holding sufficient proof of valid documentation;
- Holders of a valid diplomatic, official or service passport issued by one of the Visa-Exempt Countries and Territories.

In addition, persons on a flight that originates from or travels to the United States and stops in Canada for refuelling do not need an eTA, nor do those on a flight that has made an emergency landing in Canada.

The following persons do not require an eTA to enter Canada by air, and are, in fact, barred from applying for an eTA:

- (Canada) Canadian citizens (including dual citizens)
- Permanent residents of Canada (including those who have not formally renounced their permanent residency)
- (United States) U.S. citizens and nationals
- (United States) Lawful permanent residents of the U.S.

==== Canadian citizens and permanent residents ====
Canadian citizens and permanent residents do not need a visa or an eTA to enter Canada. However, the travel documents required to enter Canada differ depending on their status.

- Canadian citizens, including dual citizens, need a valid Canadian passport when travelling to Canada by air. Dual Canadian-American citizens can travel with a valid Canadian or U.S. passport. Other dual Canadian citizens cannot use a foreign passport alone to board a flight to or transit through Canada. Those required to use a foreign passport to enter or leave another country should travel with both passports.
- Canadian permanent residents need a valid permanent resident card or permanent resident travel document as well as their valid foreign passport when travelling to Canada by commercial transportation.

Canadian citizens who also have citizenship or nationality of a visa-exempt country (except the United States) and do not have a valid Canadian passport are barred from applying for an eTA and are required to enter Canada with a Canadian passport when arriving in Canada by air. However, those who have a flight to Canada in 10 days and meet the requirements can apply for a one-time special authorization online, which is valid for a maximum of 4 days from the applicants' travel starting date and a single entry to Canada. To be eligible, they must meet one of the following requirements:

- have previously held a Canadian passport;
- have received a certificate of Canadian citizenship; or,
- have been granted Canadian citizenship after becoming a permanent resident (i.e., a naturalized citizen).

The special authorization does not apply to Canadian citizens who do not meet the requirements, or those who are entering Canada by land or sea. As U.S. passport holders are not required to apply for an eTA under any circumstances, this measure also does not apply to them, and they can continue to travel to Canada with their U.S. passports by air even if they do not have a Canadian passport.

Permanent residents of Canada from visa-exempt countries are also barred from applying for an eTA and must travel with their valid PR card or a one-time permanent resident travel document (PRTD) when travelling to Canada by air unless they hold a U.S. passport. Those without valid PR cards or PRTDs are not allowed to board a flight to Canada and, if they no longer wish to maintain their permanent resident status, must renounce it first in order to be eligible for an eTA. Alternatively, they may enter Canada by land or sea.

During the early stages of the eTA system's rollout, Canadian dual citizens travelling without a Canadian or U.S. passport and Canadian permanent residents regularly had issues checking in for flights to Canada online as the airline systems could not find their eTA confirmation. These travellers were thus forced to check in at the airport. In some cases, travellers were denied boarding due to incorrect implementation of the eTA exemptions by airlines.

== Transit ==
Foreign citizens who need to transit through Canada to reach their final destination and are not yet authorized to travel to Canada as visitors (with a visa, eTA or exemption) need a transit visa, unless they fulfil one of the conditions listed below.

A plan was announced in 2015 to allow all passengers to transit without a visa through the Vancouver International Airport. It is unknown whether or when this plan will be implemented.

=== Special waivers for travellers to and from the United States ===
The Transit Without Visa Program (TWOV) and the China Transit Program (CTP) allow certain non-visa-exempt nationals to transit through Canada on their way to and from the United States without a Canadian transit visa and without applying to obtain the eTA. To be eligible, they must fulfil the following criteria:

- travel on an approved airline (Air Canada, Air Canada Rouge, Air China, Cathay Pacific, China Airlines, China Eastern, China Southern, Hainan Airlines, Jazz Air, Philippine Airlines, WestJet and Xiamen Airlines; codeshare flights operated by an airline not on the list are not eligible),
- transit through a participating Canadian international airport:
  - Calgary International Airport
  - Toronto Pearson International Airport (Terminal 1 only)
  - Vancouver International Airport
  - Winnipeg International Airport
  - Montreal-Trudeau International Airport (CTP participants travelling on eligible Air Canada services only)
- leave Canada within 24 hours.

In addition, passengers must remain in the sterile international transit area when arriving from the U.S., or the post-preclearance area when arriving from a third country and have cleared U.S. immigration and customs. Leaving the designated area is not permitted. Overnight connections are permitted only if the designated transit area remains open throughout the connection. If the area closes before the connecting flight departs, the passenger is ineligible for the program.

When travelling to the U.S., the passenger must hold a valid, unexpired U.S. visa in order to clear U.S. immigration and customs. However, an expired U.S. visa is acceptable for transit when travelling from the U.S. to a third country if the passenger has not overstayed the authorized period in the U.S. and is not under a removal or deportation order.

Citizens of the following countries and territories are eligible for TWOV:

- Indonesia
- Philippines
- Taiwan^{1}
- Thailand

_{1 - only for those whose passport does not contain a personal identification number.}

Under the China Transit Program, the passenger must hold a valid Chinese passport (excluding Hong Kong SAR passport and Macau SAR passport). When travelling to the United States via Canada, passengers must depart for Canada from one of the following designated cities in Asia: Beijing, Chengdu, Fuzhou, Guangzhou, Harbin, Shanghai, Shenyang, and Xiamen in Mainland China, as well as Hong Kong, Manila, Seoul, Taipei-Taoyuan, Tokyo-Narita, Tokyo-Haneda and Osaka outside Mainland China. When travelling from the United States via Canada to a third country, passengers may depart from any U.S. city and continue to any international destination.

== Types of temporary residents and Canadian visas ==
=== Types of temporary residents ===
Under Canadian government definitions, a temporary resident, as opposed to a permanent resident, is "a foreign national who is legally authorized to enter Canada for temporary purposes". Temporary residents are subjected to a number of conditions, such as the length of stay, and the ability to work or study while in Canada.

There are four types of temporary residents:

- Visitors,
- Students,
- Temporary foreign workers (TFWs),
- Temporary resident permit (TRP) holders.

Except for visitors who may enter Canada with proof of citizenship, an eTA or a temporary resident visa depending on their nationality, all other temporary residents must hold valid permits while in Canada, which must be applied before arrival, on arrival or after arrival. They may also need an eTA or a temporary resident visa in order to re-enter Canada.

Persons with temporary resident status in Canada can apply to extend their stay by filling an application at least 30 days before their authorized periods of stay expire.

==== Study permit on arrival ====
Holders of passports issued by Greenland and the United States, permanent residents of the United States, French citizens residing in St. Pierre and Miquelon and nationals of visa-exempt countries are eligible to apply for a study permit on arrival if holding sufficient documentations.

==== NAFTA professionals ====
Nationals of Mexico and the United States whose professions are covered under the North American Free Trade Agreement (NAFTA) are able to apply for a work permit on arrival.

==== Working holiday ====
Canada's working holiday scheme, International Experience Canada (IEC), provides non-Canadian citizens the opportunity to work in Canada as TFWs on an IEC work permit.

IEC is divided into three tiers:

- Working Holiday,
- Young Professionals,
- International Co-op Internship.

Depending on the agreements with the respective countries, non-Canadian citizens may be eligible to participate in all three tiers, or one or two tiers out of the three. To be eligible, they have to be a citizen of the following countries within the age limit:

- Andorra
- Australia
- Austria
- Belgium
- Chile
- Costa Rica
- Croatia
- Czech Republic
- Denmark
- Estonia
- France
- Germany
- Greece
- Hong Kong
- Iceland
- Ireland
- Italy
- Japan
- Latvia
- Lithuania
- Luxembourg
- Netherlands
- New Zealand
- Norway
- Poland
- Portugal
- San Marino
- Slovakia
- Slovenia
- South Korea
- Spain
- Sweden
- Switzerland
- Taiwan
- United Kingdom

Citizens other than those countries can still participate through a Recognized Organization.

=== Temporary resident visa ===
Citizens of the majority of countries need a temporary resident visa to enter Canada. They need to apply either online, or on paper at one of the Visa Application Centres (VACs).

Canada has introduced a program known as CAN+ for visitors of some countries who have been to Canada in the last 10 years or who possess a valid U.S. visa. When applying through CAN+, the applicant only needs to submit his or her proof of travel to U.S. or Canada and can submit fewer proof of financial support. The program is only available at certain visa offices or for nationals of certain countries.

=== Parent and grandparent super visa ===
Parents and grandparents of Canadian citizens or permanent residents can apply for the parent and grandparent super visa which allows them to stay for up to five years in Canada without renewing their status. Citizens of a visa-exempt country and U.S. permanent residents may also apply and receive the same benefit, but will not be given a visa label in their passport. Instead, they must also apply for an eTA after their application is approved in order to travel to Canada.

=== Biometrics collection ===
Canada expanded its biometrics (fingerprint and photograph) requirements in 2018 and 2019. Applicants for a visitor visa, a study permit, a work permit or permanent residence after the relevant dates must submit their biometrics at one of the VACs if outside Canada and the United States, at one of the Application Support Centres (ASCs) staffed by the United States Citizenship and Immigration Services (USCIS) if in the United States, or at a designated Service Canada location if in Canada. For persons who are either eligible to receive a work permit or a study permit on arrival or seeking asylum, biometrics will be collected at a port of entry.

Biometrics collection expansion was done in three stages:

- Since 31 July 2018, applicants with citizenship in European, Middle Eastern and African countries must provide biometrics.
- On 31 December 2018, the requirement was expanded to citizens of Asian, Oceanian, North American and South American countries except for persons already in Canada.
- On 3 December 2019, the requirement was expanded to foreign nationals located within Canada, thus completing the expansion.

Biometrics are collected once every 10 years and will be shared with governments of other Five Eyes countries. Applicants must pay a fee as a part of their application.

Canadian citizens and persons who have been granted permanent residency (unless they have formally lost their permanent residence) are exempt from biometrics collection. The following categories of persons are also exempt:

- U.S. citizens and nationals (not exempt if applying for permanent residence);
- Citizens of visa-exempt countries and U.S. lawful permanent residents visiting Canada temporarily and holding a valid eTA;
- Persons under 14 or over 79 years of age (not exempt for asylum applicants over 79);
- Diplomats, cabinet ministers and heads of state;
- Eligible persons transiting through Canada under the TWOV or CTP and holding a U.S. visa.

The following persons are no longer required to have their biometrics recollected, providing that their biometrics have already been submitted as a part of their application:

- Asylum seekers applying for a work or study permit;
- Permanent residence applicants applying for any form of temporary residence while their permanent residence application is in process.

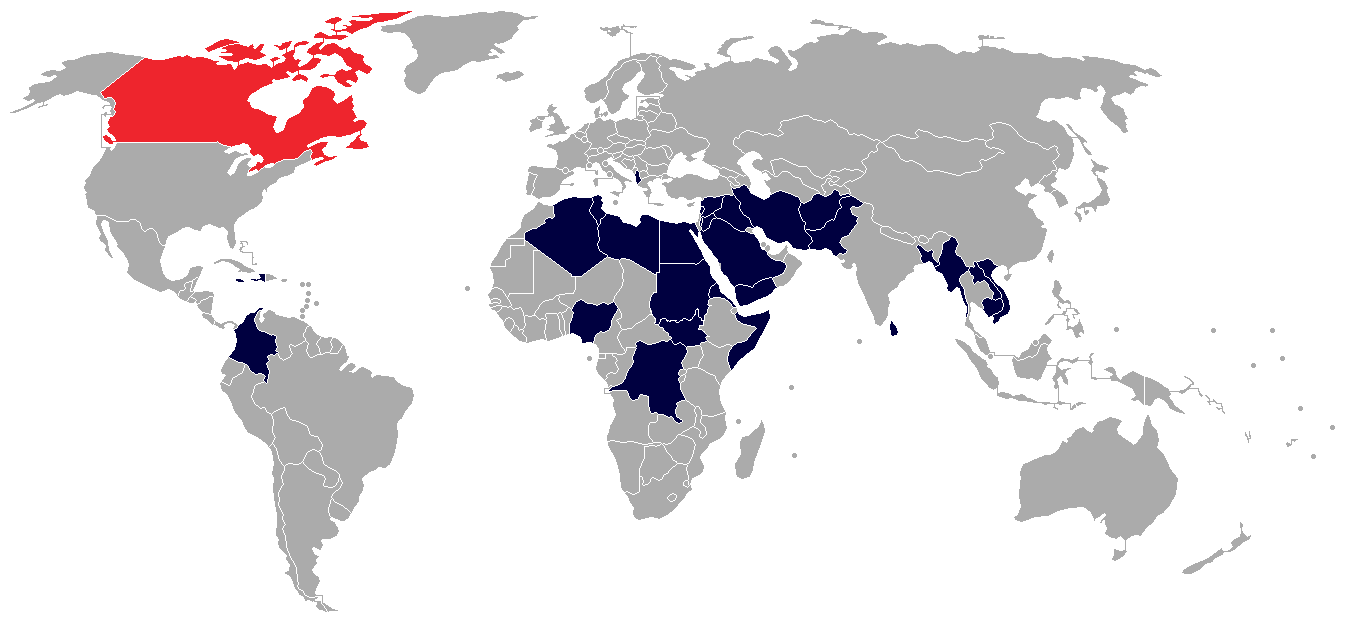
Countries whose citizens had to undergo a mandatory biometrics collection for a Canadian visa prior to the worldwide implementation date.

Before 31 July 2018, applicants from the following 30 countries had to continue to provide biometrics as a part of a pilot requirement from 2013. Those who applied for a visa before 31 July 2018 had to provide their biometrics every time they submit an application. However, those who submitted an application after the date will no longer need to give biometrics if they have given them in the past, and their biometrics would be valid for 10 years from the most recent time they gave them.

- Afghanistan
- Albania
- Algeria
- Bangladesh
- Cambodia
- Colombia
- DR Congo
- Egypt
- Eritrea
- Haiti
- Iran
- Iraq
- Jamaica
- Jordan
- Laos
- Lebanon
- Libya
- Myanmar
- Nigeria
- Pakistan
- Palestine
- Saudi Arabia
- Somalia
- South Sudan
- Sri Lanka
- Sudan
- Syria
- Tunisia
- Vietnam
- Yemen

== Statistics ==
Number of tourist visas issued:

Year	Number of visas
2012	663,911
2013	685,923
2014	834,362
2015	919,761
2016	1,028,834

Most visitor visas in 2016 were issued to the nationals of following countries:

Application from	Issued visas
China	350,940
India	148,193
Mexico	74,767
Brazil	61,571
Philippines	34,889
Iran	16,752
Pakistan	15,638
Nigeria	15,529
Vietnam	15,013
Indonesia	14,555

Arrival statistics

Most visitors arriving to Canada were from the following countries of nationality:

Country/Territory	2017	2016	2015	2014	2013
United States	▲24,335,415	▲23,895,385	▲22,057,860	▼20,345,412	▼20,435,329
United Kingdom	▼819,530	▲850,841	▲733,280	▲695,787	▼663,219
China	▲694,543	▲624,865	▲511,234	▲471,823	▲365,314
France	▲576,239	▲552,109	▲507,627	▲490,185	▲465,548
Germany	▲399,578	▲381,837	▲343,716	▲341,416	▲322,419
Australia	▲392,364	▲352,345	▲307,123	▲300,844	▲279,936
Mexico	▲366,639	▲252,218	▲204,756	▲180,052	▲156,856
Japan	▼320,309	▲322,220	▲294,934	▲277,305	▼238,474
South Korea	▲293,666	▲254,759	▲204,741	▲183,770	▲158,523
India	▲261,801	▲225,121	▲200,094	▲185,888	▲154,409
Hong Kong	▼149,321	▲158,475	▲152,624	▲141,852	▲133,453
Italy	▲142,870	▲138,114	▲128,422	▲125,935	▼100,795
Brazil	▲140,353	▲115,004	▲113,242	▲100,947	— 94,555
Netherlands	▲139,554	▲136,784	▲120,504	▲106,585	▼100,233
Switzerland	▼128,563	▲131,901	▲118,202	▲116,358	▼110,303
Taiwan	▲103,642	▲102,629	▲76,124	▲72,436	▲64,036
Spain	▲99,708	▲90,749	▲76,212	▲68,716	▼56,657
Israel	▲78,340	▲75,638	▲71,361	▲66,529	▼62,806
Belgium	▲74,047	▲70,704	▲60,479	▲55,715	▼52,457
Philippines	▲72,276	▲70,644	▼65,409	▲75,746	▲67,401
New Zealand	▲64,154	▲62,118	▲56,622	▲53,186	▲50,809
Sweden	▲51,330	▲51,173	▼43,762	▲43,854	▲40,679
Denmark	▲47,918	▲47,155	▲41,612	▲40,652	▼36,597
Singapore	▲37,981	▲37,702	▼35,370	▲36,511	▲35,689
Jamaica	▼32,866	▲32,915	▲30,340	▲29,553	▲27,805
Portugal	▲29,726	▲24,160	▼23,579	▲24,787	▲23,750
Trinidad and Tobago	▲27,022	▲25,229	▲23,737	▼22,917	▲24,809
Malaysia	▲14,448	▲14,233	▼13,450	▲13,543	▼12,681
Greece	▲14,188	▲13,984	▲13,834	▼12,693	▼12,783
Total	▲30,997,320	▲30,142,291	▲27,554,943	▲25,558,014	▼25,167,015

== Visa policy changes ==
Canada's visa policy has gone through a number of changes in the recent years. In 1984, citizens of 76 countries could travel to Canada without a visa. The number of countries has now dropped to 54.

On 5 September 2002, visa restrictions were reintroduced for Saudi Arabian citizens travelling to Canada because "Saudi Arabia has not demonstrated the necessary will nor that it possesses the infrastructure to deny the use of its passports to terrorists, criminals or other inadmissible persons".

On 24 September 2002, visa restrictions were reintroduced for Malaysian citizens travelling to Canada because "the Malaysian passport and passport issuing system are vulnerable to abuse".

On 11 May 2004, visa restrictions were reintroduced for Costa Rican citizens travelling to Canada because the "number of Costa Rican nationals travelling to Canada to claim refugee protection or to enter the United States illegally, using Canada as a transit point, continues to grow" and also because there is "a growing incidence of Costa Rican document abuse by nationals of neighbouring countries".

On 26 March 2009, visa requirements were lifted for Croatian citizens travelling to Canada because "immigration violation and visa application refusal rates for Croatian nationals have steadily decreased over the past five years, while the number of refugee claims and removals has remained low".

On 13 July 2009, visa restrictions were reintroduced for Mexican citizens travelling to Canada because of three main factors: the number of refugee claims for Mexican nationals has substantially increased from less than 3,500 in 2005 to almost 9,500 in 2008, the immigration violation rate has steadily increased over the past three years and the risks related to travel documents, organised crime and corruption.

Canadian citizens enjoy visa-free access to the Schengen Area, which includes the Czech Republic. When the Czech Republic joined the European Union with 9 other countries in 2004, the European Union started a dialogue with the Canadian government to lift visa requirements for citizens of these countries to receive visa reciprocity between all Schengen countries and Canada. The result was the lifting of visa requirements for Czech citizens in October 2007. However, on 16 July 2009, Canada reintroduced visa requirements for Czech citizens as the overstay percentage was very high because many Roma filed for asylum. The EU urged Canada that "This highly regrettable situation should be brought to an end as soon as possible." In October 2013, following a contentious reform of the refugee determination system that significantly brought down the number of false asylum claims, Canada lifted visa requirement for Czech citizens effective immediately on November 14, 2013.

Starting from 22 November 2010, holders of an ordinary Taiwan passport with a personal identification number were able to enter Canada without a visa because "TRV refusal rates and the number of immigration violations, removals, and asylum claims by Taiwan passport holders are low".

On 13 September 2012, Botswana, Namibia, Saint Lucia, Saint Vincent and the Grenadines and Swaziland were removed from the list of exempted nations. As a result, citizens of these five countries were required to obtain visas in advance to travel to or transit through Canada. Botswana, Namibia, and Swaziland were removed primarily due to concerns relating to human trafficking (especially of minors) and the use of fraudulent documents. Also, Namibia had the highest immigration violation rate, with 81% of its citizens in Canada committing immigration violations, and 71% of Namibian travellers made asylum claims in 2011 in Canada. Saint Lucia and Saint Vincent and the Grenadines were removed mainly because of unreliable travel documents, in particular because "criminals from these countries can legally change their names and acquire new passports". In certain cases, citizens of these two countries "who were removed from Canada as security risks later returned using different passports". In addition, the removal of Saint Lucia and Saint Vincent and the Grenadines was prompted by the "unacceptably high number of asylum claims from St. Lucia and St. Vincent, with about one and a half percent and three percent of the population of these countries making asylum claims in Canada over the past five years".

On 12 May 2014, Canadian government sources announced a possible removal of visa requirements for Chilean citizens, following its participation as the 38th member of the US Visa Waiver Program. Visa requirements were finally lifted on 22 November 2014.

In October 2014, it was reported that the Comprehensive Economic and Trade Agreement with the European Union might not be ratified by Bulgaria and Romania unless the visa requirement was lifted for their citizens by Canada. Under Canadian legislation, for a country to be added to the visa waiver list there should be less than 3% immigration violations and visa refusal rate of less than 3% over 3 years. For Bulgarians the immigration violation rate was 4.4% in 2013 and the average 3 year visa refusal rate was 15.76%. For Romanians the immigration violation rate was 2.7% in 2013 and the average 3 year visa refusal rate was 15%. Even though the thresholds are not absolute, Canadian authorities notified the EU that political manoeuvre is not possible when the difference between the threshold and rates is too big.

As of 22 November 2014, holders of Saint Kitts and Nevis passports need a visa to enter Canada due to national security concerns related to the country's citizenship by investment program.

In December 2014, Canadian Foreign Minister John Baird announced changes in legislation that would allow a visa-free regime for all EU citizens.

In April 2015, the previous Prime Minister of Canada, Stephen Harper, announced that Brazilian, Bulgarian, Mexican and Romanian citizens who had recently visited Canada or who had a valid U.S. non-immigrant visa would be able to visit Canada without a visa but with an electronic authorization from 2016.

Incumbent Prime Minister of Canada, Justin Trudeau, committed to abolish visa requirements for Mexicans visiting Canada. On 28 June 2016, Trudeau announced that the visa requirements for Mexican nationals would be lifted on 1 December 2016, although many government officials were critical of the plan and advised against it. The risks identified include Mexico's weak passport controls, a potential rise in fake asylum claims, the increase of human and illegal drug trafficking, and the involvement of organized crime of some travellers. In addition, the U.S. can potentially tighten border controls which may slow the cross-border trades between the two countries and harm Canada's economy. Opposition parties criticized that the move was "a completely political quid pro quo" in exchange for the Mexican government to lift the ban on Canadian beef since 2003.

On 31 October 2016, the Canadian government announced that Canada intended to lift visa requirement for Romanian and Bulgarian citizens on 1 December 2017.

According to CBC News, sources confirmed that after Donald Trump had been elected to the U.S. presidency on 8 November 2016, high-level meetings took place between officials at IRCC and other departments in order to prepare for a potential surge of asylum seekers and overstayers from Mexico, although the visa requirements will still be dropped on 1 December as planned. Some officials did state that Canada will reintroduce visa requirements if the number of asylum seekers is too high.

On 24 November 2016, the Canadian government announced that starting from 25 November 2016, Mexican nationals can apply for the eTA online. However, Mexicans entering Canada before 1 December would continue to need a visa. On the same day, Mexican nationals could no longer apply for a visa online and had to apply on paper through a visa application centre. The visa requirement was lifted on 1 December as planned and the issuance of visas to Mexican nationals ceased, although Statistics Canada predicts that the net cost of lifting the visa requirement is over CA$262 million in the next decade, which includes the additional immigration enforcement resources and the extra costs of processing asylum claims.

From 1 May 2017, Brazilian, Bulgarian and Romanian citizens who have had a Canadian visa in the last 10 years or who hold a valid U.S. non-immigrant visa can fly to or transit through Canada without a Canadian visa.

As of 27 June 2017, holders of Antigua and Barbuda passports need a visa to enter Canada due to concerns regarding the integrity of Antigua and Barbuda's travel documents.

On 1 December 2017, visa requirements were lifted for Bulgarian and Romanian citizens travelling to Canada.

On 5 June 2018, visa requirements were lifted for Emirati citizens travelling to Canada.

On 5 June 2018, the Canadian government announced that due to "a substantial increase in asylum claims and non-bona fide travel from Romania, with a concerning number of travellers using temporary and other non-electronic passports", Canada has immediately imposed visa restrictions on Romanian citizens who do not hold biometric passports and who did not obtain an eTA prior to 1 December 2017. These people's eTAs, if issued on or after 1 December 2017, are cancelled, and they must apply for a visa at their nearest Canadian visa application centres (VACs) or, if holding booking confirmation for travels booked prior to 5 June 2018 and depart before or on 18 June 2018, in person at a Canadian embassy in Bucharest, London, Rome or Vienna for same-day visa processing. Persons whose eTA was issued prior to 1 December 2017 or those who hold Romanian biometric passports are not affected by this restriction.

On 6 June 2023, nationals of Antigua and Barbuda, Argentina, Costa Rica, Morocco, Panama, Philippines, Saint Kitts and Nevis, Saint Lucia, Saint Vincent and the Grenadines, Seychelles, Thailand, Trinidad and Tobago, and Uruguay who had a Canadian visa in the previous 10 years or who held a valid U.S. non-immigrant visa became eligible to apply for an eTA instead of a visa to travel to Canada by air.

On 29 February 2024, visa restrictions were reintroduced for Mexican citizens visiting Canada as there was an increase in many asylum claims made by Mexican citizens that were rejected. In addition, there was a sharp increase in the number of Mexican nationals at the illegal crossings between Canada and the United States, using Canada as a transit point.

On 25 November 2025, Canada lifted the visa requirement for citizens of Qatar.

On 26 May 2026, nationals of Indonesia and Malaysia who had a Canadian visa in the previous 10 years or who held a valid U.S. non-immigrant visa became eligible to apply for an eTA instead of a visa to travel to Canada by air.

== Unrecognized travel documents ==
The Canadian government does not accept any passport issued by Somalia, non-machine-readable passports issued by the Czech Republic, temporary passports issued by South Africa, or provisional passports issued by Venezuela.

Holders of Somali passports are de facto excluded from Canada, as there is no authority in Somalia that is recognized by the Canadian government as being competent to issue passports on behalf of Somalia, and Canadian immigration authorities will therefore not endorse visas in Somali passports. Somali citizens may travel on the passport of another country.

== See also ==
- Visa requirements for Canadian citizens
- Immigration to Canada
