= Bill C-12 =

Bill C-12 refers to various legislation introduced into the House of Commons of Canada, including:

- An Act to amend the Criminal Code (protection of children and other vulnerable persons) and the Canada Evidence Act, introduced in 2004 to the third session of the 37th Parliament; not passed but subsequently re-introduced
- Safeguarding Canadians' Personal Information Act, introduced in 2011 to the first session of the 41st Parliament; not passed
- Strengthening Canada's Immigration System and Borders Act, introduced in 2025 to the first session of the 45th Parliament; pending Senate approval as of January 2026
