= C12 =

C12, C.XII or C-12 may be:

- LNER Class C12, a class of British 4-4-2T locomotives
- C12 Workmen's Compensation (Agriculture) Convention, 1921
- C-12 Huron, a logistics support aircraft of the U.S. Military (military versions of the Beechcraft Super King Air)
- C-12 Vega, an early transport of the United States Army Air Corps
- Albatros C.XII, a World War I German military reconnaissance aircraft
- Autovia C-12, a highway in Catalonia, Spain
- Callaway C12, an American contemporary sports car
- Cierva C.12, a 1927 British experimental autogyro
- HMS C12, a British C-class submarine of the Royal Navy
- JNR Class C12, a class of Japanese steam locomotive
- Sauber C12, a 1993 racing car
- Spyker C12 Zagato, a 2007 Dutch car
- USS Columbia (C-12), a light cruiser of the United States Navy
- C-12: Final Resistance, a video game for PlayStation
- The 12th century
- Carbon-12, the most abundant stable isotope of carbon
- Malignant neoplasm of piriform sinus ICD-10 code
- Bill C-12 in Canadian law
