= Lawful Access Act =

Proposed Canadian legislation

Parliament of Canada
- Long title: An Act respecting lawful access
- Considered by: House of Commons of Canada

Legislative history
- Bill title: Bill C-22
- Introduced by: Gary Anandasangaree
- First reading: 12 March 2026
- Status: Pending

The Lawful Access Act, also known as Bill C-22, is a proposed piece of legislation of the 45th Parliament of Canada.

The bill contains provisions regarding "lawful access" to information from electronic service providers as part of criminal investigations by law enforcement and the Canadian Security Intelligence Service (CSIS). It will compel telecommunications providers to identify without a warrant whether individuals under reasonable suspicion of criminal activity are users of their services, and requires "electronic service providers" to assist in providing data to law enforcement when requested.

The bill's provisions were originally proposed as part of the Strong Borders Act (Bill C-2), which also included provisions regarding immigration reform. The bill faced opposition from both the Conservative Party of Canada and the New Democratic Party of Canada due to expressed concerns of potential overreach. In late-2025, amid controversy over the lawful access portion, the omnibus bill was split into a revised Bill C-22 and C-12 (Strengthening Canada's Immigration System and Borders Act) so that they could be considered individually.

== Contents ==
Strong Borders Act

Parliament of Canada
- Long title: An Act respecting certain measures relating to the security of the border between Canada and the United States and respecting other related security measures
- Considered by: House of Commons of Canada

Legislative history
- Bill title: Bill C-2
- Introduced by: Gary Anandasangaree
- First reading: 3 June 2025
- Status: Not passed

The bill contains two main sections. The first section, "Timely access to data and information", grants law enforcement the authority to—without a warrant—compel telecommunications providers to identify whether they have provided services to an individual, if they have "reasonable grounds to suspect" that they have committed or are about to commit a crime. Only a "yes" or "no" response can be compelled; authorities may only request "subscriber information" (such as names, addresses, and emails associated with the individual under investigation) via a court warrant. A provider can challenge and appeal these demands in court.

This provision is intended to fill a "gap" in investigation capabilities formed by the Supreme Court's ruling in R v Spencer, which found that law enforcement could not request information on individual telecom subscribers without a court warrant due to an expectation of privacy, and Charter protections against unreasonable search or seizure.

The second section is titled the Supporting Authorized Access to Information Act (SAAIA): "electronic service providers" (ESPs) are obligated to provide "reasonable assistance" to "permit the assessment or testing of any device, equipment or other thing that may enable an authorized person to access information". It grants the Governor-in-Council the ability to create regulations regarding "core providers"—a class of ESPs that can be obligated (subsection (2)) to co-operate with law enforcement on developing, implementing, or installing means for authorized persons to access information from the service as part of an investigation, which can include being required to retain metadata for up to one year.

Core providers cannot be compelled to retain a user's internet browsing history, social media activities, or the "content [...] of information transmitted in the course of an electronic service", nor are they required to comply with subsection (2) obligations if they would "introduce a systemic vulnerability related to that service or prevent the provider from rectifying such a vulnerability."

== History ==
In June 2025, minister of public safety Gary Anandasangaree introduced Bill C-2, the Strong Borders Act; the bill came amid an ongoing trade war with the United States, which saw U.S. president Donald Trump impose tariffs on Canada and Mexico for failing to control an alleged influx of illegal immigrants and fentanyl entering the United States via their respective borders.

The bill was an omnibus consisting of immigration- and surveillance-related measures. The border measures proposed a tightening of asylum rules in order to control an ongoing backlog of pending cases, and additional authority for the mass cancellation of temporary residency visas and permanent resident cards if deemed to be in the "public interest". Parts 14 and 15 established "lawful access" regulations; Part 14 compelled anyone who provided a "service" to the public to comply with warrantless requests from law enforcement (including the Canadian Security Intelligence Service (CSIS)) for certain information regarding a user of the service (including confirmation that they are a customer, how long they have been a customer, and a "name or identifier" of the user), if they have "reasonable grounds to suspect" that the user is engaged in or likely to engage in criminal activity. Law enforcement could also receive authorization from a court to request "all" information regarding the user, which does not require a warrant in "exigent circumstances". Part 15 (SAAIA) established obligations for "electronic service providers" to "permit the assessment or testing of any device, equipment or other thing that may enable an authorized person to access information", and the Governor-in-Council to establish and define obligations of electronic service providers who are "core providers".

Bill C-2 faced opposition from the Conservative Party of Canada and the New Democratic Party of Canada, both of which had expressed they could not support it due to their concerns of potential overreach. After facing criticism over the breadth of its data access provisions, the Liberal Party elected to split the bills into the separate bills C-12 (Strengthening Canada's Immigration System and Borders Act) and C-22 (Lawful Access Act) so that the passage of the immigration-related measures could be expedited. Bill C-22 contained some changes to the lawful access provisions in comparison to Bill C-2, including replacing Part 14 with a narrower provision that only allows warrantless requests to telecom providers to identify whether a specific person is a subscriber to their services, and expanded Part 15 to include the possibility of additional data retention obligations.

== Reception ==
Minister of Public Safety Gary Anandasangaree stated that the bill was necessary to bring Canada's intelligence capabilities in line with those of its allies, and was designed to "[balance] the needs of law enforcement with the privacy and civil rights that Canadians demand."

Conservative leader Pierre Poilievre opposed the introduction of Bill C-2, expressing concern with the potential to inspect mail without a warrant and stated that it "attacks the freedoms and the privacy of Canadians".

The SAAIA portion of the bill has faced opposition from civil liberties and digital privacy advocates, as well as technology companies, who displayed concern that it could compromise user privacy and require the weakening of services utilizing end-to-end encryption. University of Ottawa professor Michael Geist noted that although the new "confirmation of service" provision was an improvement over Bill C-2 due to its narrower scope (including applying only to telecom companies rather than "services") and limits on subscriber information can be obtained without a warrant, but showed concerns over its requirement of a “reasonable grounds to suspect”—a weaker standard than the “reasonable grounds to believe” used for production orders under the Criminal Code. Geist also displayed major concerns over SAAIA, noting the broad definition of an "electronic service provider", that the exemption for systemic vulnerabilities "lacks specificity" and could thus allow the government to "define encryption and vulnerability narrowly enough to hollow out the protection", and that it contradicted a portion of the law that "unconditionally require[s] compliance with orders and provide that orders prevail over inconsistent regulations." It has also been suggested that Bill C-22's provisions are meant to align with potential agreements under the U.S. CLOUD Act.

Apple Inc. warned that the bill "could allow the Canadian government to force companies to break encryption by inserting backdoors into their product" and would "undermine our ability to offer the powerful privacy and security features users expect from Apple", while Meta Platforms' head of public policy Rachel Curran stated that it would "conscript private companies into service as an arm of the government’s surveillance apparatus." A number of VPN services, including NordVPN and Windscribe, as well as the secure messaging service Signal, threatened to leave the Canadian market or move out of Canadian jurisdiction if Bill C-22 were to take effect, as the requirements on "core providers" were inconsistent with their privacy policies. U.S. chair of the House Judiciary Committee Jim Jordan and chair of the House Foreign Affairs Committee Brian Mast stated that the bill "harms U.S. national security and economic interests by undermining trust in American technology and inviting reciprocal demands from other nations."

Anandasangaree dismissed these concerns, arguing that U.S. tech companies were "misinterpreting some of the safeguards that are already built in, including on ensuring that encryption is not in any way interrupted as part of Bill-22." Geist argued that Anandasangaree was "follow[ing] much the same script" as the government's response to companies such as Meta threatening to block links to news articles in response to the Online News Act.

== See also ==
- Protecting Children from Internet Predators Act
