= Strengthening Canada's Immigration System and Borders Act =

Act of the Parliament of Canada

Parliament of Canada
- Long title: An Act respecting certain measures relating to the security of Canada's borders and the integrity of the Canadian immigration system and respecting other related security measures
- Citation: Strengthening Canada's Immigration System and Borders Act, S.C. 2026, c. 4
- Territorial extent: Canada
- Enacted by: House of Commons of Canada
- Considered by: Senate of Canada
- Assented to by: Governor General; Mary Simon; In the name of King Charles III
- Royal assent: 26 March 2026

Legislative history

Initiating chamber: House of Commons of Canada
- Bill title: Bill C-12
- Introduced by: Gary Anandasangaree
- First reading: 8 October 2025
- Second reading: 23 October 2025
- Third reading: 11 December 2025
- Passed: 11 December 2025
- Voting summary: 327 voted for; 8 voted against

Revising chamber: Senate of Canada
- First reading: 11 December 2025
- Second reading: 5 February 2026
- Third reading: 12 March 2026
- Passed: 12 March 2026 (on division)
- Status: In force

The Strengthening Canada's Immigration System and Borders Act, also known as Bill C-12, is a Canadian federal statute which took effect on 26 March 2026.

The legislation introduces new immigration policies and increases the scope of Immigration, Refugees and Citizenship Canada (IRCC), including new time limits on asylum claims, allowing increased data sharing between IRCC with other divisions and levels of government, and allowing IRCC to suspend or cancel immigration applications and intake, and "cancel, suspend or change" immigration documents, when deemed to be in the public interest.

The bill's provisions were originally proposed during the 45th Parliament of Canada as part of the Strong Borders Act (Bill C-2), which also included provisions regarding "lawful access" to data from electronic service providers by law enforcement. In late-2025, amid criticism of these provisions, they were split into a separate bill known as the Lawful Access Act (Bill C-22), while the immigration provisions were retained as part of Bill C-12.

== History ==
In June 2025, minister of public safety Gary Anandasangaree introduced Bill C-2, the Strong Borders Act; the bill came amid an ongoing trade war with the United States, which saw U.S. president Donald Trump impose tariffs on Canada and Mexico for failing to control an alleged influx of illegal immigrants and fentanyl entering the United States via their respective borders. After facing criticism for its warrantless lawful access provisions, the Liberal Party elected to split the bills into the separate C-12 and C-22 (Lawful Access Act) so that the passage of the immigration-related measures could be expedited.

== Contents ==
Strong Borders Act

Parliament of Canada
- Long title: An Act respecting certain measures relating to the security of the border between Canada and the United States and respecting other related security measures
- Considered by: House of Commons of Canada

Legislative history
- Bill title: Bill C-2
- Introduced by: Gary Anandasangaree
- First reading: 3 June 2025
- Status: Not passed

The main intents of Bill C-12 are to "modernize" Canada's asylum process (including simplifying the online application process, and reducing an ongoing backlog of pending claims), and provide Immigration, Refugees and Citizenship Canada (IRCC) with additional authority for inter-departmental data sharing, and to manage immigration documents on a case-by-case basis when deemed to be in the public interest.

The bill enacts stricter time limits on asylum claims made after 3 June 2025: retroactively to 24 June 2020, asylum seekers who do not make their claim within one year of their first entry into Canada (even if they have left the country since), or within 14 days of entry by irregularly crossing the Canada–United States land border, will not have their claims referred to the Immigration and Refugee Board (IRB). Applicants may still have the right to a pre-removal risk assessment.

The bill includes provisions relating to inter-departmental information sharing, allowing IRCC to "share identity, status and IRCC-issued documents" with federal, provincial, and territorial partners under written agreements. It also enables IRCC to cancel or suspend the processing of immigrants, pause the intake of immigration applications, and "cancel, suspend or change" immigration documents (including permanent resident cards) on a case-by-case basis when deemed to be in the public interest.

== Reception ==
Most of the measures in Bill C-12 were first proposed by Minister of Immigration, Refugees and Citizenship Marc Miller; in a 2024 letter to then-prime minister and deputy prime minister Justin Trudeau and Chrystia Freeland, he stated that "increasing numbers of asylum seekers, resource constraints and evolving global migration dynamics" had resulted in "lengthy processing times and backlogs, and resulting in prolonged uncertainty for migrants", and that the policies would mitigate the risks raised by "anticipated changes to U.S. immigration policies". IRC director-general of asylum Jason Hollmann stated that the one-year limit was meant to discourage "misuse" of the asylum system and control "surges".

The bill faced criticism from the Canadian Bar Association, Canadian Council for Refugees, and Amnesty International, including arguments that it would create a "two-tier" system where not all asylum seekers would be guaranteed the right to an oral hearing where they can detail the basis of their claim (with the pre-removal risk assessment consisting only of a written submission to a single officer with a higher rate of rejection, and not having some of the same protections such as access to work permits and medical coverage), and cause issues in situations where a person may be denied a hearing, but deportation to their country of origin had been suspended by the Canadian government due to armed conflicts. The bill had been described by critics as a backpedal by prime minister Mark Carney towards anti-immigration policies similar to those prior to World War II.

The retroactive one-year limit for asylum claims was also criticized, as applicants could be denied a hearing with the IRB for having simply visited Canada in the past for any reason—even if the situation in their country of origin had changed since. While the United States has a similar rule, it is based on one year since the most recent entry into the country, rather than the first. In one case, a Palestinian refugee was informed in April 2026 that he may be ineligible for an asylum claim due to the one-year limit because he had previously visited Toronto in August 2023 (only two months before the October 7 attacks) to donate a kidney to his daughter. He had made his claim in May 2025, and settled in August under a special temporary visa program for people impacted by the Gaza war that are among the extended family of a Canadian resident.

The bill was reviewed by the Standing Senate Committee on National Security in February 2026; it recommended that the one-year time limit for asylum claims be increased to five years and be retroactive to the date of royal ascent rather than 24 June 2020, and that the provisions allowing IRCC to cancel or modify immigration documents (which a witness feared could be used for discrimination) required "robust parliamentary oversight" due to its unclear "public interest" standard. The Senate did not consider any amendments to address these recommendations prior to passage.

Following its enactment, the legislation began to face lawsuits challenging its constitutionality under the Charter of Rights and Freedoms, including Section 7 and Section 15. In May 2026, the Federal Court agreed to allow for 39 of these cases to be consolidated as "specially-managed proceedings" under an appointed judge due to their "similar and complex constitutional challenges".

== See also ==
- Online Harms Act
- Combatting Hate Act
