= Canadian Certificate of Identity =

International travel document issued by Immigration, Refugees and Citizenship Canada

- Front cover
- Type: Certificate of Identity
- Issued by: Canada
- Eligibility: Permanent resident of Canada; Stateless or unable to obtain a passport

The Canadian Certificate of Identity (French: Certificat d’identité) is an international travel document issued by Immigration, Refugees and Citizenship Canada to a permanent resident of Canada who is not yet a Canadian citizen, is stateless, or is otherwise unable to obtain a national passport or travel document. It is a biometric document with a grey (formerly brown) cover and is bilingual in both English and French. The validity period of the travel document is determined by the issuing office.

== Eligibility ==
The applicant must either be stateless, or be unable to obtain a national passport.

== Use ==
The Certificate of Identity may be used for travel to all countries/territories specified in the travel document, apart from the bearer's country of citizenship if they are not stateless.

The holder of a Canadian Certificate of Identity issued by virtue of their statelessness and legally resident in Canada can enter Slovenia visa-free for a maximum of 90 days within a 180-day period. This visa exemption does not apply to those who hold a Certificate of Identity because they have been unable to obtain a national passport, rather than being stateless.

The holder of a Canadian Certificate of Identity issued under any category cannot travel to Germany, nor apply for a Schengen visa at a German embassy as Germany does not recognize this document.
