= S-5 visa =

Type of non-immigrant visa used by the United States

The S-5 visa is a non-immigrant visa which allows travel to United States for individuals who are witnesses, informants, or otherwise supplying information regarding a criminal organization and whose presence in the US is necessary for law enforcement to pursue investigation or prosecution. The S visa class, including the S-5 and S-6 visas, was created in 1994 by the Violent Crime Control and Law Enforcement Act.

An individual admitted on an S-5 may stay for a period of up to three years, must report their whereabouts to the US Attorney General quarterly, must not be convicted of a crime punishable by more than a year in prison, and must waive their right to contest deportation. Once a person admitted under an S visa has completed the terms of their classification, a federal or state law enforcement agency or the US Attorney General may submit an application for permanent residence on their behalf. The S-5 visa was created by Congress on October 1, 2001 in response to the September 11 terrorist attacks.
