= Safeguarding Canadians' Personal Information Act =

Canadian federal legislation

- Long title: An Act to amend the Personal Information Protection and Electronic Documents Act

Legislative history
- Introduced by: Christian Paradis, Minister of Industry
- First reading: 2011-09-29

The Safeguarding Canadians' Personal Information Act (French: Loi protégeant les renseignements personnels des Canadiens, Bill C-12) is an act to amend the Personal Information Protection and Electronic Documents Act. Introduced by the Conservative government of Stephen Harper on September 29, 2011, during the 41st Parliament. It was not enacted into law.

There was a great deal of controversy surrounding the act as it appears to bring in warrantless surveillance by police much like Bill C-30 proposed. As well while it is supposed to protect Canadian's privacy rights it erodes them by greatly increasing the number of exceptions to the rules of passing information around.

The Safeguarding Canadians' Personal Information Act was not progressed during the 41st parliament, and has not become law.

== Warrantless Surveillance ==
Currently, section 7(3)(c.1) of PIPEDA arguably operates as a blocking statute preventing organizations from voluntarily handing over customer information in situation where police have failed to demonstrate their 'lawful authority' to request it.

The new amendments would not only expand the number of reasons they can make a request and lets Telecommunications Service Providers hand over this data without fear of retribution or reprisal by their customers.
