= Immigration, Refugees and Citizenship Canada =

Government department

- Immigration, Réfugiés et Citoyenneté Canada
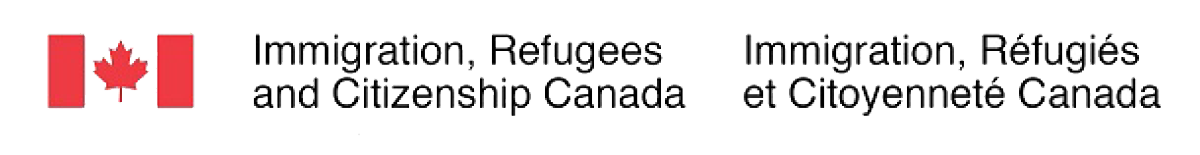

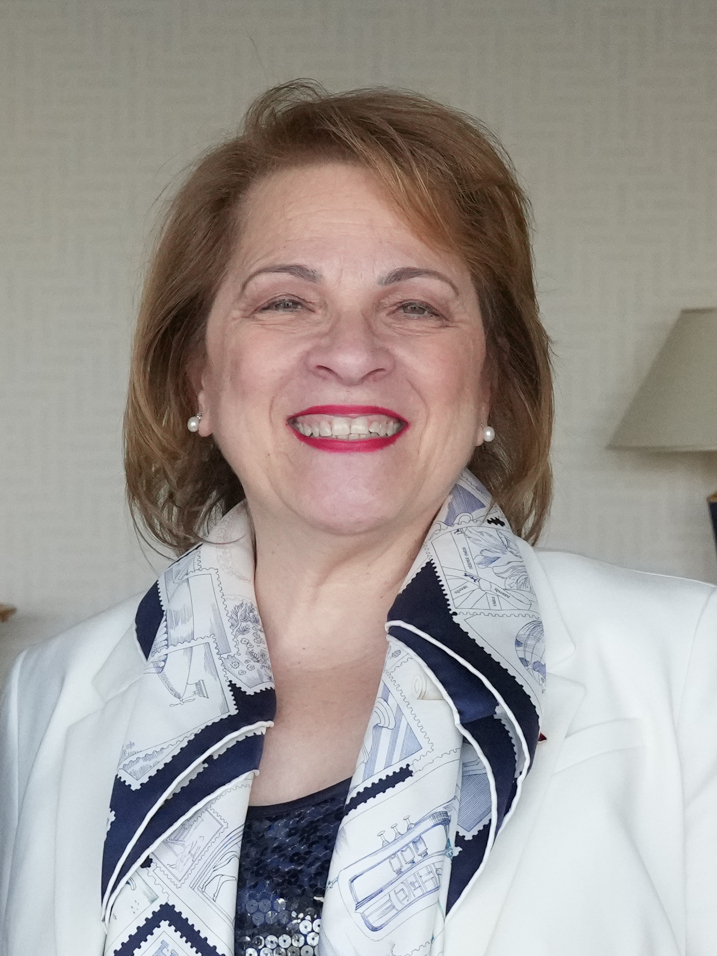
- Lena Diab, Minister for Immigration, Refugees and Citizenship

Department overview
- Formed: 1994
- Type: Responsible for: Immigration; Refugees; Citizenship
- Jurisdiction: Canada
- Headquarters: Ottawa, Ontario
- Employees: 13,685 (15 October 2023)
- Annual budget: $3.6 Billion CAD (2022)
- Minister responsible: Lena Diab, Minister of Immigration, Refugees and Citizenship
- Deputy Ministers responsible: Ted Gallivan, Deputy Minister; Scott Harris, Associate Deputy Minister
- Website: Official website

Immigration, Refugees and Citizenship Canada (IRCC; French: Immigration, Réfugiés et Citoyenneté Canada) (Note: Immigration, Refugees and Citizenship Canada is the applied title under the Federal Identity Program since 2015; the legal title is the Department of Citizenship and Immigration (French: Ministère de la Citoyenneté et de l'Immigration).) is the [department of the Government of Canada with responsibility for matters dealing with immigration to Canada, including refugees and protected persons, and Canadian citizenship. The department was established in 1994 following a reorganization.

== Organization ==
The Departmental Results Report (2018–2019), stated that a total of 7,414 full-time equivalent employees are currently employed with IRCC. The same report stated that IRCC planned to have 7,378 full-time equivalent employees in 2019–2020 and 7304 in 2020–2021.

=== Mandate, role and objective ===
Immigration, Refugees and Citizenship Canada's mandate is specified in the Department of Citizenship and Immigration Act. The Minister of IRCC administers the Citizenship Act of 1977 and its subsequent amendments. The Minister of IRCC works closely with the Minister of Public Safety in relation to the administration of the Immigration and Refugee Protection Act.

The department:

- screens and approves for admission, immigrants, foreign students, visitors and temporary workers who help Canada's social and economic growth
- resettles, protects and provides a safe haven for refugees
- helps newcomers adapt to Canadian society and become Canadian citizens
- manages access to Canada to protect the security and health of Canadians and the integrity of Canadian laws and
- helps Canadians and newcomers to participate fully in the economic, political, social and cultural life of the country.

— IRCC

The issuance and control of Canadian passports and other travel documents that facilitate the travel of Canadian citizens, permanent residents and protected persons is also under the responsibility of IRCC.

== History ==
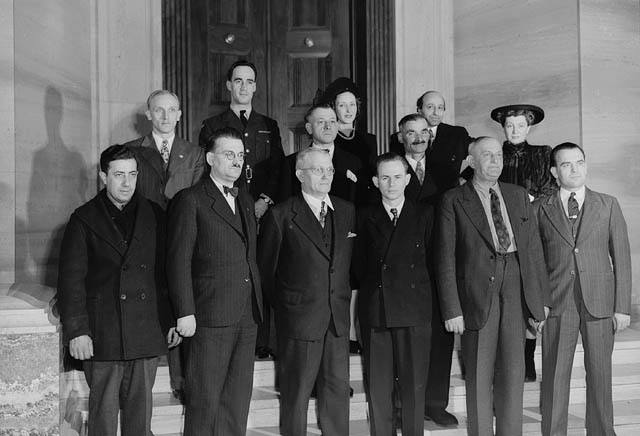
First official Canadian Citizenship ceremony at the Supreme Court building. Ottawa, Canada. (Front row: l.-r.:) Naif Hanna Azar from Palestine, Jerzy Wladyslaw Meier from Poland, Louis Edmon Brodbeck from Switzerland, Joachim Heinrich Hellmen from Germany, Jacko Hrushkowsky from Russia, and Anton Justinik from Yugoslavia. (Back row: l.-r.:) Zigurd Larsen from Norway, Sgt. Maurice Labrosse from Canada, Joseph Litvinchuk, Roumania, Mrs. Labrosse from Scotland, Nestor Rakowitza from Roumania and Yousuf Karsh from Armenia with Mrs. Helen Sawicka from Poland

Formerly known as Citizenship and Immigration Canada, the department was established in 1994 following a reorganization within the government and was renamed to its current name with the swearing in of the 29th Ministry in 2015.

Prior to the establishment of the Naturalization Act of 1947, persons who were born in Canada, as well as those who were naturalized Canadians regardless of their country of origin, were all categorized as British subjects. Therefore, during these times, "citizen" and "citizenship" referred to people living in Canada rather than those in possession of Canadian citizenship status.

The Citizenship Act of 1947 established Canadian citizenship as distinct from British subject status. Under the British North America Act 1867, immigration responsibilities were shared by the federal government and provincial / territorial governments and commissions.

=== Citizenship and immigration legislation ===
Immigration and citizenship legislation are laws that set standards, policies and practices in accordance with the Citizenship Act.

== Facilities ==
IRCC operates a network of "Citizenship and Immigration Centres" throughout Canada such as Case Processing Centres (CPCs), Centralized Intake Offices (CIOs), and Operations Support Centres (OPCs), as well as an important number of embassies, high commissions, and consulates abroad.

=== International ===
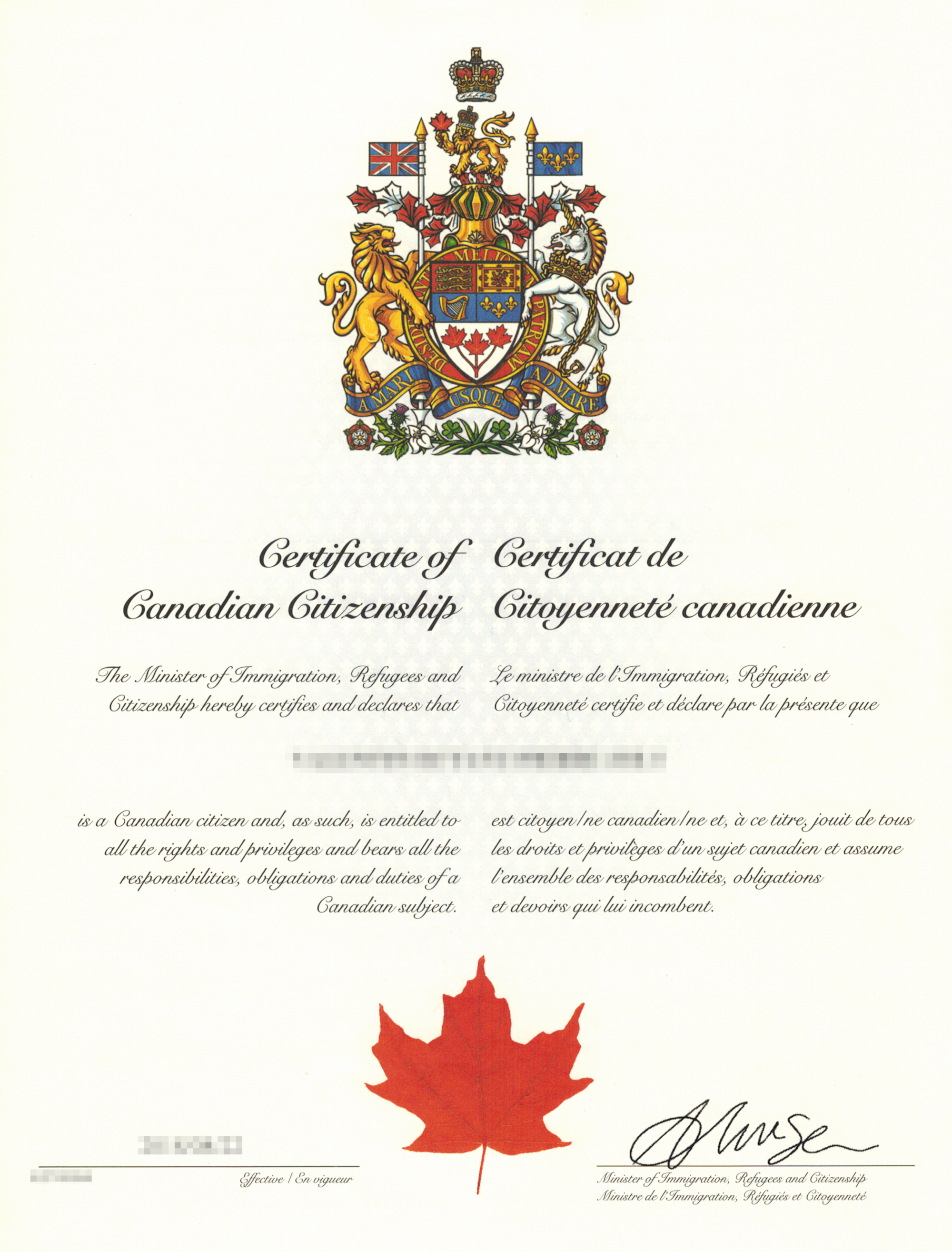
Certificate of Canadian citizenship issued in 2018

Canadian embassies and consular offices abroad handle immigration, refugee, and visa applications, as well as provide consular services to Canadians overseas. There are identified countries in different regions around the globe that are strategically located and serve as case processing centres for students, temporary residents, visitors, refugees and landed immigrants visa applications.

Service Canada is responsible for some of the domestic field operations of the department, while the Canada Border Services Agency controls enforcement and entry control at ports of entry.

IRCC remains responsible for the establishment of policies and processing of permanent and temporary resident visa, refugee protection and citizenship applications.

== Funding ==
The Departmental Results Report for 2018–2019 reported that the actual spending amount by IRCC was CA$2,403,858,757. The budget was spent through various immigration programs.

As part of an initiative called the "Settlement Program and Resettlement Assistance Program," updated application forms are provided online by IRCC for available funding opportunities for settlement organizations across Canada. These programs support organizations that provide settlement and integration services, such as language instruction and employment assistance.

The Government of Canada resettled 25,000 Syrian refugees by February 2016 through several sponsorship programs.:

1. Privately Sponsored Refugees (PSRs), who were financially supported by private citizens or organizations;
2. Government Assisted Refugees (GARs), who were funded by IRCC through the Refugee RAP; and
3. Blended Visa Office-Referred Refugees (BVORs), which is a type of refugee classified by United Nations Commission on Human Rights (UNCHR) and subsequently paired with Canadian private sponsors.

== Citizenship Commission ==
Oath of Citizenship ceremony, 2012

Under Immigration, Refugees and Immigration Canada, the Citizenship Commission is responsible for the administration of citizenship grants to new applications who are admissible for Canadian citizenship. Composed of citizenship judges across Canada, the Commission's mandate is to administer Oath of Citizenship; process and approve citizenship applications that meet residency requirements.

=== Citizenship judges ===
Citizenship judges are obliged to obey the mandate as stated by the Citizenship Commission under the Citizenship Act and the Citizenship Regulations. They provide citizenship application assessment ensuring that the applicants meet the necessary requirements, such as residency, they will administer the Oath of Citizenship during ceremonies and review the rights, privileges and duties of a Canadian citizen, conduct hearings, and supply written decisions following timeline set by the regulation. They are also asked to maintain the integrity of the citizenship application process.

== Family reunification delays in Quebec ==
In Quebec, the family reunification program has faced extended processing times due to the limited number of admission places set under provincial quotas. The province establishes annual caps for this category, which were nearly reached in 2023. These limits prevent the federal government from accelerating the processing of applications without exceeding the targets defined by the Quebec government.

As of late 2023, applicants in Quebec faced waiting times of up to 42 months to sponsor a spouse abroad, compared with about 13 months in other Canadian provinces. In July 2023, approximately 38,800 sponsorship applications were pending in Quebec.

The Quebec Ministry of Immigration stated that the federal government is responsible for processing applications once Quebec issues selection certificates. Federal authorities have also reported backlogs across several immigration programs, as noted by the Auditor General of Canada.

Opposition parties and immigration advocates have called on the provincial government to review its immigration priorities and allocation of quotas. Some experts have suggested reducing the share of economic immigrants and increasing family reunification targets to address the growing delays.

== See also ==
- Immigration and Refugee Board of Canada
- Economic impact of immigration to Canada
- Canada permanent resident card
- Temporary residency in Canada
- Employment and Social Development Canada
- Canada–United States Safe Third Country Agreement
