= Canada permanent resident card =

ID document

Canadian Permanent Resident Card

- Sample of a Permanent Resident Card (often called a "PR Card") of Canada
- Type: Personal identification document
- Issued by: Immigration, Refugees and Citizenship Canada
- Purpose: Identification; Travel document
- Valid in: Canada
- Expiration: 5 years 1 year (residency obligation issues)
- Cost: C$50

The permanent resident card (French: carte de résident permanent), also known colloquially as the PR card, is an identity document and a travel document that shows that a person has permanent residency in Canada. As of 2025, there are an estimated 3.13 million permanent residents in Canada, many of whom are eligible to become Canadian citizens.

Permanent resident holders are entitled to apply for Canadian citizenship after continuously residing in Canada for at least 1,095 days during a 5-year period, presenting a good moral character, proving proficiency in English or French, filing taxes if required, passing the Canadian Citizenship Test, and swearing an Oath of Citizenship.

Like Canadian passports, all PR cards are issued by Immigration, Refugees and Citizenship Canada (IRCC) and are the property of the Canadian Crown and must be returned or destroyed upon request.

Permanent resident applications are assessed and decided by Immigration, Refugees and Citizenship Canada (IRCC), however in some cases the Minister of Immigration, Refugees and Citizenship may waive certain requirements, or even grant permanent residency on humanitarian and compassionate grounds.

== History ==
Before 1910, immigrants to Canada were referred to as landed immigrant (French: immigrant reçu) for a person who has been admitted to Canada as a non-Canadian citizen. The Immigration Act 1910 introduced the term of "permanent residence," and in 2002 the terminology was officially changed in with the passage of the Immigration and Refugee Protection Act.

The permanent resident card was first proposed during the aftermath of the September 11 attacks in the United States. After the establishment of the Immigration and Refugee Protection Act in 2002 the first Canadian Permanent Resident cards were distributed on 28 June 2002.

Starting from 10 November 2016, all travellers to Canada (except for Canadian citizens and permanent residents, U.S. citizens, nationals and lawful permanent residents, and travellers with a valid Canadian visa) are required to have an Electronic Travel Authorization (eTA) before boarding a flight to Canada. Hence permanent residents, including those from one of the visa-free countries (except the United States), need either a PR card or a PRTD to board a flight to Canada.

== Rights and responsibilities of a permanent resident ==
A permanent resident holds many of the same rights and responsibilities as a Canadian citizen, including the right to live, work, and study in any province or territory of Canada. Permanent residents enjoy many of the same social benefits that Canadian citizens receive, including becoming contributing members of the Canada Pension Plan and receiving coverage by their province or territory's universal health care system, and as of 2022 are allowed to enlist in the Canadian Armed Forces. All permanent residents are entitled to the rights, freedoms, and protections under the Canadian Charter of Rights and Freedoms.

Permanent residents may apply for Canadian citizenship after living in Canada for a certain amount of time. Currently, a person must have been living in Canada as a Permanent Resident for three years (1095 days) out of the five years preceding their application (with up to one year of the time before becoming a permanent resident included). They also have the right to sponsor relatives for permanent residence, subject to fulfilling residence criteria and assurance of support requirements.

== Restrictions of a permanent resident ==
Permanent residents do not have the right to vote in any federal, provincial, or municipal elections in Canada nor can they run for elected office in any level of government. Several municipal governments in Canada, including Toronto, Vancouver, Halifax, and Calgary, have proposed giving permanent residents the right to vote in municipal elections, but none of these proposals have succeeded. For national security reasons, permanent residents also cannot hold jobs in either the public or private sectors that require a high-level security clearance.

As non-citizens, permanent residents must use the passport of their current nationality in combination with a permanent resident card for international travel because they cannot be issued Canadian passports (unless they are stateless and issued a Canadian Certificate of Identity or refugee travel document). Some countries will grant visa-free entry to Canadian permanent residents even if their current nationality would not typically qualify. To re-enter Canada on a commercial carrier (flight, bus, etc.) a permanent resident must present either their permanent resident card or a Permanent Resident Travel Document issued by a Canadian diplomatic office.

== Loss of permanent residence status ==
Canadian permanent residency is automatically lost upon becoming a Canadian citizen. The PR card is physically destroyed as part of the Oath of Citizenship ceremony.

Permanent residency can also be revoked if the bearer is outside of Canada for longer than 730 days in a five-year period (unless serving abroad as a Crown servant), or has committed criminal or immigration infractions resulting in a removal order.

Canadian permanent resident holders can voluntarily renounce their status after filling form IMM 5782.

A permanent resident does not lose their status if their permanent resident card expires, nor do they lose their status without adjudication by an official.

== Design ==
There have been three types of PR card in circulation: the 2002, the 2009 and the 2015 version. As all PR card's lifespan cannot exceed five years, the initial 2002 and 2009 versions should be no longer in use.

All three versions of the card contain a maple leaf in the front of the card, hence earning the nickname "maple leaf card".

=== 2002 version ===
Permanent Resident Card (2002–2009)

The card is an ISO/IEC 7810 ID-1 sized (commonly known as credit-card sized) document. The front of the card contains the holder's photograph, name, an 8-digit ID number, sex, nationality, date of birth, signature and the card's date of expiration. For the back of the card, an optical stripe which contains the holder's information is available on top. Below it are additional information on the holder including their immigration category, colour of eyes and height, country of birth as well as the day the holder became a permanent resident. A machine readable zone is at the bottom. The colour of the card is aqua, with graphs in purple and orange, and a maple leaf can be seen in the front.

=== 2009 version ===
Permanent resident card (2009–2015)

Comparing to the previous version, the 2009 version of the card, which was introduced on 24 August 2009, contains the same information as the previous version. The design, however, was significantly changed with a white background colour, a transparent window on the right side of the card, a second ghost image located in the transparent window, and the replacement of optical stripe with a 2-D barcode.

PR cards issued after 1 February 2012 no longer contain the holder's signature.

=== 2015 version ===
Permanent Resident Card (2015–2022)

In circulation since 25 November 2015, the 2015 version of the card has an RFID chip which can be used for future land border crossings. Unlike the biometric chips found in Canadian passports, the RFID chip does not store any personal data, but instead a unique identifier. When entering Canada from a land port of entry, the RFID chip in the PR card will be read by RFID tag readers. The unique identifier is then transmitted to a secure database and the permanent resident's information is retrieved by the CBSA officer who will have information even before the vehicle stops at the inspection booth. The design is similar to the 2009 version, although an image of the Peace Tower is shown on the background. The new version also removed immigration category and the 2-D barcode from the back of the card.

=== Current version ===
A nuanced, mostly aesthetic redesign of the card was issued sometime after the 2022 version.

Permanent Resident Card (current)

==== Machine Readable zone ====
There is a machine-readable zone at the back of the card. It consists of 3 rows each containing 30 characters. The format is compliant with ICAO Document 9303 Part 5.

Row	Positions	Length	Example	Meaning
1	1-2	2	CA	Document code (identifies the document as a non-passport travel document and to Canadian authorities as a PR card)
1	3-5	3	CAN	ISO 3166 Alpha-3 code of Canada
1	6-14	9	PA0123456	Permanent Resident Card number, matches with the small barcode at the top left and the text at the top right
1	15	1	0	Check digit for positions 6-14
1	16	1	<	Separator character
1	17-26	10	0123456789	UCI number, ID No at the front of the card
1	27-29	3	<	Separator character
1	30	1	5	Unknown digit
2	1-6	6	950110	Date of birth in YYMMDD format
2	7	1	3	Check digit for position 1-6
2	8	1	F	Abbreviated gender
2	9-14	6	250101	Expiry date in YYMMDD format
2	15	1	8	Check digit for positions 9-14
2	16-18	3	IND	ISO 3166 Alpha-3 code of country of citizenship
2	19	1	<	Separator character
2	20-25	6	200101	Issue date in YYMMDD format
2	26	1	<	Separator character
2	27-28	2	01	Unknown digits
2	29	1	<	Separator character
2	30	1	4	Composite check digit
3	1-30	30	JANE<<DOE<ANON	Family name(s) each separated by a single separator character (<), two separator characters (<<), given name(s) each separated by a single separator character (<)

Checksum calculation is the same algorithm used in Machine-readable passports. Multiply each digit by its weight. Weight of a digit depends on its position. The weight sequence is 7, 3, 1 and it repeats. All values are added and the result divided by 10 gives the check digit.

== Application ==
=== New permanent residents ===
It is necessary to supply a Canadian residential address at the time of landing. If a Canadian address cannot be supplied at the time, one must be provided to IRCC within 180 days. Otherwise, a new application made to IRCC's processing centre in Sydney, Nova Scotia, will be required, at a cost of CA$50 to the applicant. There is no fee for a first PR card provided that the applicant provides an address before the 180-day deadline.

=== Existing permanent residents and renewals ===
Permanent residents as of 28 June 2002 and new permanent residents who did not provide a Canadian residential address, or whose PR card was expired, lost, stolen or damaged, must apply to IRCC's processing centre in Sydney, Nova Scotia, for a new card. The applicant must demonstrate residency for at least 730 days before the five-year period of the card's renewal application. The fee is CA$50. In some cases, the PR card must be collected in person at an IRCC office in Canada.

=== Validity ===
The PR card is normally valid for five years. However, it may be valid for one year for those whose PR status is being assessed by the IRCC.

As permanent residents must meet the residency obligation (minimum of 730 days in every five years) in order to renew PR cards, all valid PR card holders are deemed to have not lost permanent resident status and have the right to enter and remain in Canada during the card's validity. If, however, the Canada Border Services Agency (CBSA) officer at the port of entry considers the permanent resident may not meet the residency obligation, the person may be reported to IRCC and may be required to attend a hearing to determine their PR status.

A PR card's expiration date does not indicate that the holder's status as a permanent resident has expired, or will expire, on that date. It is the date after which the card must be replaced with a new card.

=== Permanent residents outside Canada ===
It is not possible to apply for the PR card outside Canada. Instead, permanent residents wishing to travel to Canada who do not have a valid PR card may apply for a single use Permanent Resident Travel Document (PRTD) which allows a journey to Canada as a permanent resident. The application may only be submitted to Government of Canada offices abroad and the fee is CA$50. The officers abroad will then determine whether the person still has permanent resident status.

== Proof of permanent resident status ==
Whether one is a permanent resident or not is determined by the provisions of the IRPA. Under section 31(2)(a) of the IRPA, a person with a valid permanent card or signed confirmation of permanent residence document (electronic or otherwise) is presumed to be a permanent resident unless the IRCC officer determines that they are no longer a permanent resident. Similarly, under section 31(2)(b) of the IRPA, a person who is outside Canada without a valid PR card or signed confirmation of permanent residence document (electronic or otherwise) is presumed not to be a permanent resident unless proven otherwise.

The IRPA, however, does not specify the requirement for a permanent resident to hold a PR card, so a permanent resident who does not hold a valid PR card continues to be a permanent resident regardless of whether they are physically in Canada, by satisfying the residency obligation and the status has not been revoked.

=== Use as a proof of status and for visa-free travel ===
==== In Canada ====
A PR card is the most convenient way of proving status to authorities within Canada (e.g. provincial governments, employers, schools). All permanent residents have other documentation (such as original landing papers) which is also acceptable. However, there is no legal requirement for a permanent resident to carry a PR card at all times.

==== Outside Canada ====
For visa-free travel, Canadian permanent residents require a PR card, unless the person's passport in itself is sufficient for exemption. A Canadian PR card holder may travel visa-free to the following countries if not already exempt:

Country	Duration allowed	Notes
All Dutch Caribbean territories	90 days	
Anguilla	90 days	
Antigua and Barbuda	30 days	VOA fees is 100 USD. PR card must be valid for at least 6 months from the day of arrival.
Armenia	21 or 120 days	Eligible to obtain VOA or Armenia e-Visa; AMD 3000 for 21 days or AMD 15000 for 120 days single-entry.
Bahamas	30 days	PR card of which the expiry date must NOT be less than 3 months (for direct travel) and NOT less than 6 months (if transiting through other countries such as the U.S.)
Belize	30 days	Verify eligible nationalities, not applicable to all.
Bermuda	6 months	
British Virgin Islands	6 months	
Cayman Islands	30 days	
Costa Rica	30 days	Validity of at least one calendar day remaining when entering Costa Rica, and proof of financial solvency of at least US$100 per person per month (or fraction) of stay in Costa Rica.
Cuba	30 days	
Dominican Republic	60 days	
El Salvador	90 days	Verify eligible nationalities, not applicable to all
Georgia	90 days in 180 days	
Guatemala	90 days	Verify eligible nationalities, not applicable to all
Honduras	90 days	Verify eligible nationalities, not applicable to all
Jamaica	6 months	Verify eligible nationalities, not applicable to all
Kosovo	15 days	
Mexico	180 days	
Moldova	90 days	
Montenegro	30 days	
Panama	6 months	PR must be valid for at least 6 months from date of arrival.
Peru	6 months	Nationals of China or India only
Qatar	30 days	
Saint Pierre and Miquelon	90 days in 180 days	
Singapore	96 hours	Visa-free transit to or from a third country for nationals of China or India only.
Sint Maarten	90 days	
South Korea	30 days	when in transit, not applicable to all nationalities
Taiwan	30 days	online registration required, only applicable to certain nationalities
Turks and Caicos Islands	90 days	
United Arab Emirates	14 days	Nationals of India, Kenya, Indonesia, Vietnam, Thailand, Philippines, and South Africa holding a valid Canadian visa or residence permit valid for a period of not less than six (6) months.
United Kingdom	< 48 hours	Holders of PR issued on or after 28 June 2002 can transit under TWOV program. Must arrive/depart by air and leave before 23.59 hours on the day after the day when they arrive.

== Requirement to enter Canada ==
A Canadian permanent resident has the right to enter Canada under section 27(1) of IRPA, provided that their PR status has not been revoked, hence legally speaking, a permanent resident does not need a PR card to enter Canada.

Due to the changes in visa policy, however, all permanent residents are required to hold a valid PR card to board a flight to Canada unless they hold a U.S. passport. As any person can approach one of the Canadian land ports of entry along the Canada–United States border, a permanent resident does not need to hold a valid PR card to enter Canada from the United States, although they may face difficulties when boarding a commercial carrier (bus, ship or train).

== See also ==
- Immigration to Canada
- Canada immigration statistics
- Annual immigration statistics of Canada
- Canadian nationality law
- Green card, equivalent document in the United States
- Blue Card (European Union)
- Indefinite leave to remain, a British residence status equivalent to the Canada permanent resident card
- Western Hemisphere Travel Initiative
