= Service Canada =

Point of access for government programs

Program overview
- Formed: September 14, 2005
- Minister responsible: Hon. Patty Hajdu, Minister of Jobs and Families
- Program executive: Cliff Groen, Associate Deputy Minister and Chief Operating Officer
- Parent department: Employment and Social Development Canada
- Website: servicecanada.gc.ca

Service Canada is the program operated by Employment and Social Development Canada to serve as a single-point of access for the Government of Canada's largest and most heavily used programs, such as the social insurance number, the Employment Insurance program, the Old Age Security program and the Canada Pension Plan. Service Canada centres also accept applications for Canadian passports.

== History ==
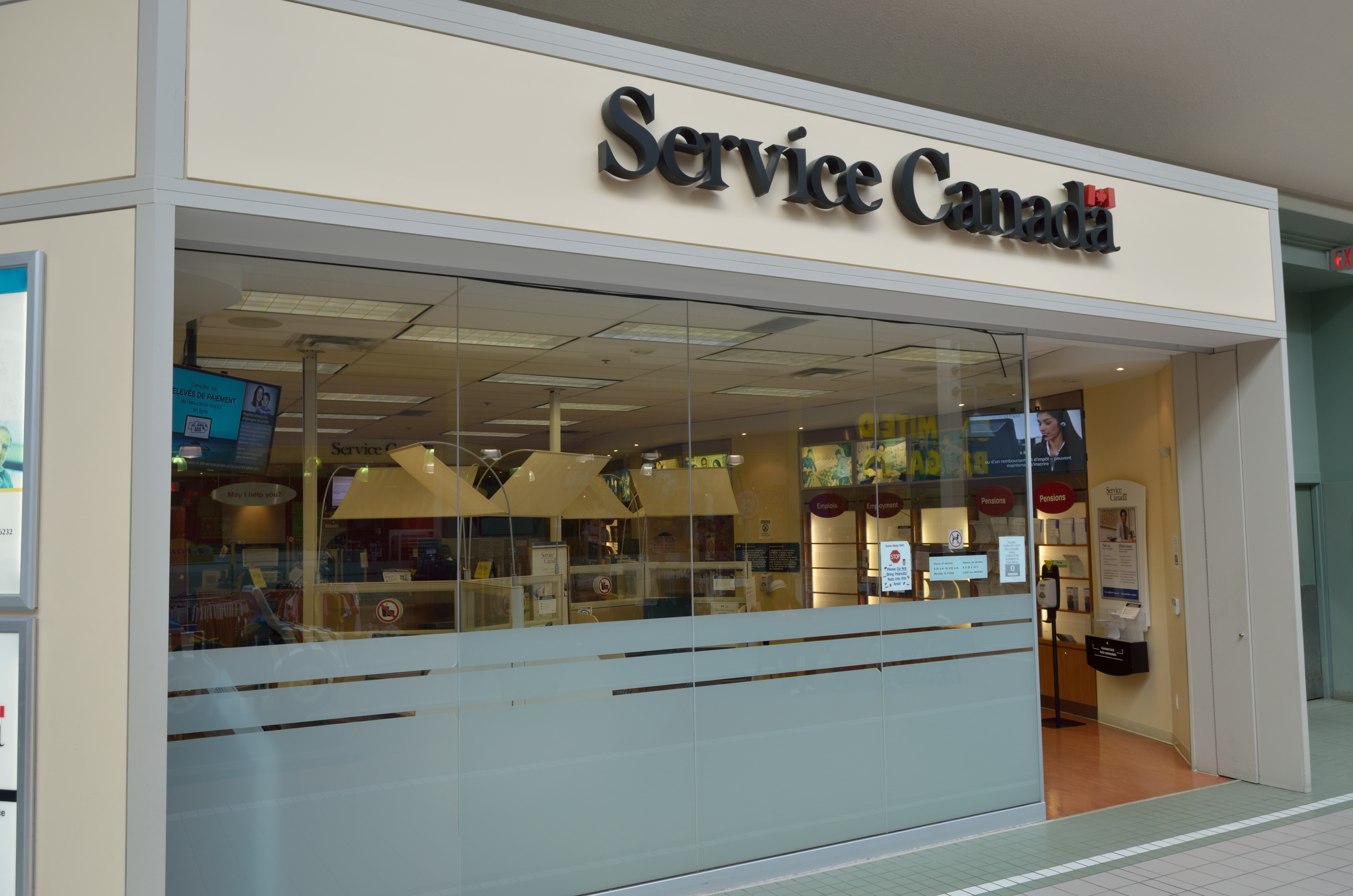
Service Canada in Malvern Town Centre in Toronto

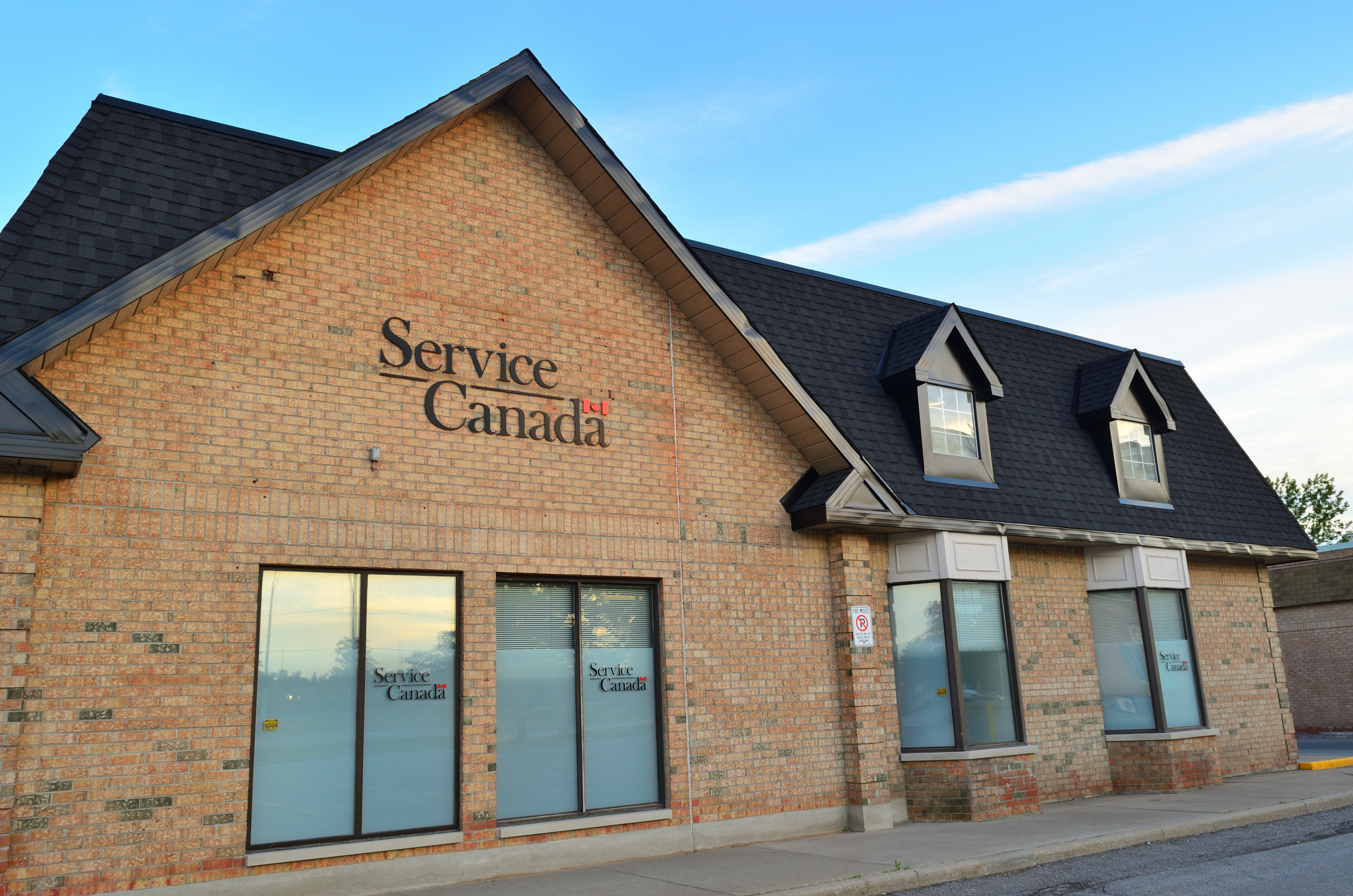
Service Canada in Markham

Service Canada officially began operations on September 14, 2005 with a mandate to provide a single point of access to a range of government services and benefits either in person, by phone, by internet, or by mail. Service Canada's origins, however, date back to 1998 when the Government of Canada began developing an integrated citizen-centred service strategy based on detailed surveys of citizens' needs and expectations.

As of May 2007, Service Canada has partnered with over 14 other departments and agencies to provide access to more than 50 government programs and services. It also had established close to 500 points of service across Canada – many of which are outreach and mobile offices designed to deliver programs and services into rural and remote areas.

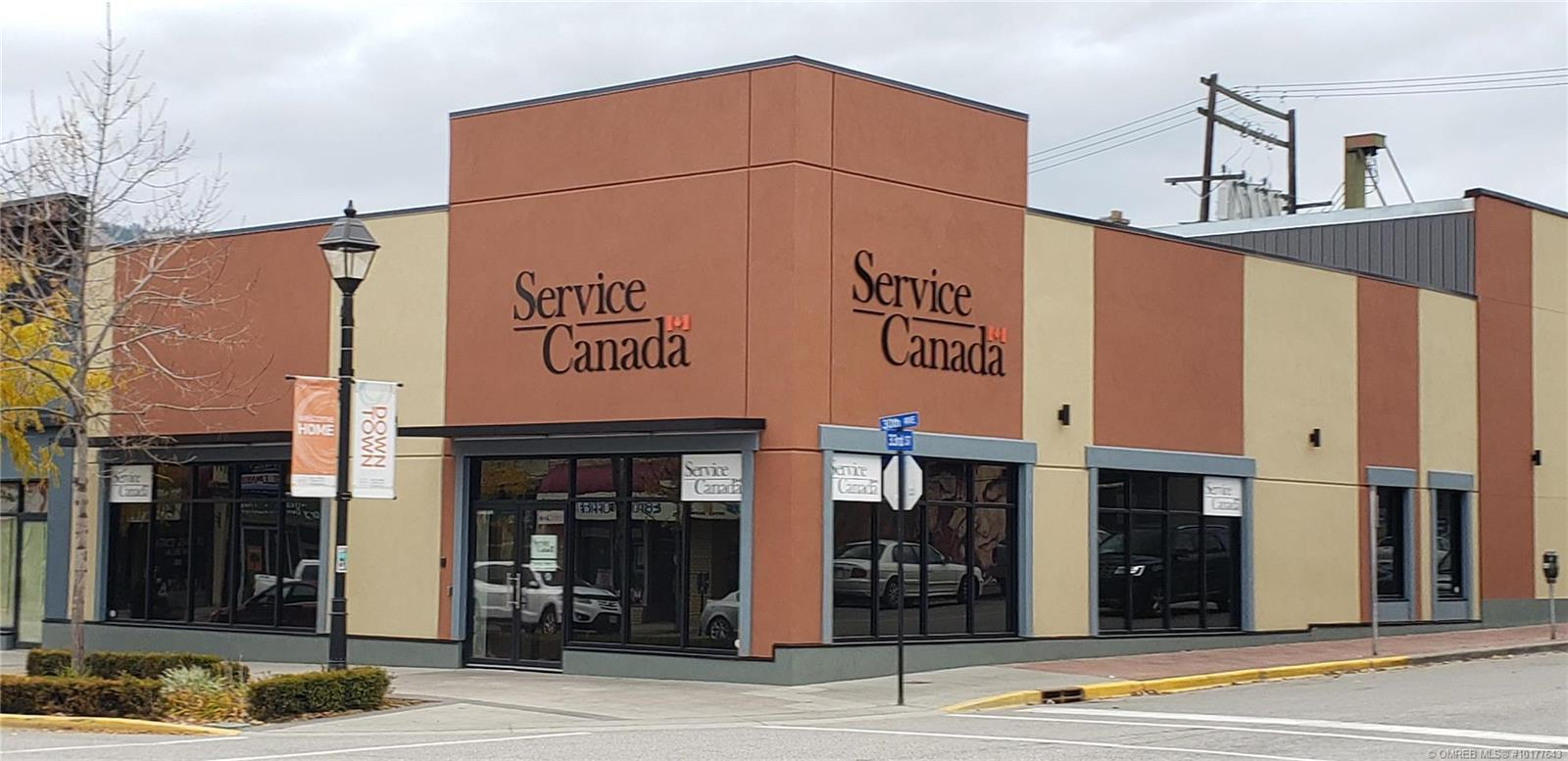
Service Canada in Vernon, BC

== Description ==
Similar initiatives to Service Canada have been established in many Canadian provinces and jurisdictions across Canada, such as Service New Brunswick (SNB), and ServiceOntario. The goal of delivering citizen-centred service has also been embraced by most developed countries around the world for several years – with Canada consistently ranked as a leader in the field by consulting firms such as Accenture.

Service Canada is currently a part of the Employment and Social Development Canada. The department is the Government of Canada's major provider of social programs, services and benefits, and is a key player in the development of the full range of social policies at the federal level.

The current Minister responsible for Service Canada is Patty Hajdu, Minister of Jobs and Families.

Service Canada announced in fall 2005 that it was subcontracting some of its service delivery to SNB, the first public sector multi-service agency in Canada; this is believed to be a precedent whereby a provincial agency was contracted to deliver a federal service.

Service Canada is a sponsor of Women in Science and Engineering Newfoundland and Labrador (WISE NL).
