= Annual immigration statistics of Canada =

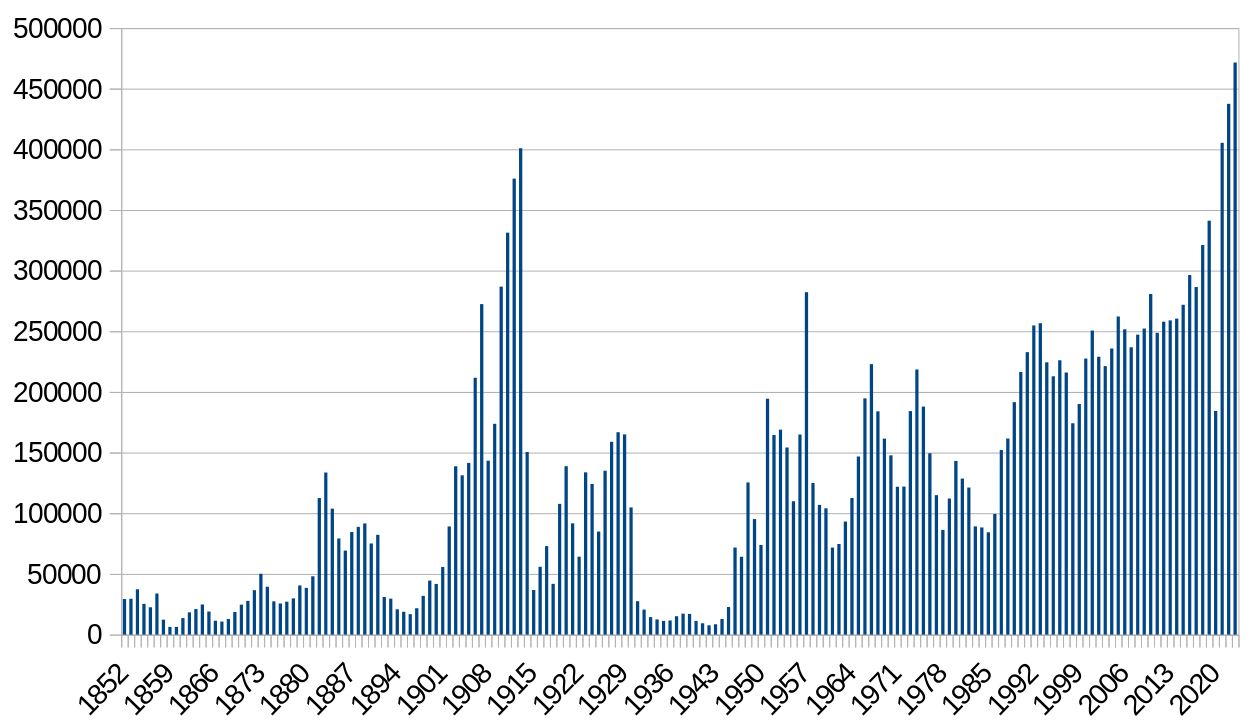
Trend of Canadian immigration

Annual immigration statistics have existed in Canada prior to confederation in 1867, and continue into the contemporary era. During this period, the highest annual immigration rate to Canada occurred in 1913, when 400,900 new immigrants accounted for 5.3 percent of the total population, while the largest number of immigrants admitted to Canada in single year occurred in 2024, when 483,655 new immigrants accounted for 1.2 percent of the total population.

Following British and French colonization, what is now Canada has seen four major waves (or peaks) of immigration and settlement of non-Indigenous Peoples take place over a span of nearly two centuries. Canada is currently undergoing its fifth wave.

== Background ==
Since confederation in 1867, the highest annual immigration rate in Canada occurred during the early 20th century, including 1913 (new immigrants accounted for 5.3 percent of the total population), 1912 (5.1 percent), 1911 (4.6 percent), 1907 (4.3 percent) and 1910 (4.1 percent). At this time, immigration from the British Isles increased, supplemented by a rapid increase in immigration flows from continental Europe, especially Germany, Scandinavia, and the Soviet Union.

Annual immigration statistics 1852 to 1897
Year	Total population	Number of immigrants	Immigration rate
1852	2,414,519	29,300	1.21%
1853	N/A	29,500	N/A
1854	N/A	37,300	N/A
1855	N/A	25,300	N/A
1856	N/A	22,500	N/A
1857	N/A	33,900	N/A
1858	N/A	12,300	N/A
1859	N/A	6,300	N/A
1860	N/A	6,300	N/A
1861	3,174,442	13,600	0.43%
1862	N/A	18,300	N/A
1863	N/A	21,000	N/A
1864	N/A	24,800	N/A
1865	N/A	19,000	N/A
1866	N/A	11,400	N/A
1867	3,463,000	10,700	0.31%
1868	3,511,000	12,800	0.36%
1869	3,565,000	18,600	0.52%
1870	3,625,000	24,700	0.68%
1871	3,689,000	27,800	0.75%
1872	3,754,000	36,600	0.97%
1873	3,826,000	50,100	1.31%
1874	3,895,000	39,400	1.01%
1875	3,954,000	27,400	0.69%
1876	4,009,000	25,600	0.64%
1877	4,064,000	27,100	0.67%
1878	4,120,000	29,800	0.72%
1879	4,185,000	40,500	0.97%
1880	4,255,000	38,500	0.9%
1881	4,325,000	48,000	1.11%
1882	4,375,000	112,500	2.57%
1883	4,430,000	133,600	3.02%
1884	4,487,000	103,800	2.31%
1885	4,537,000	79,200	1.75%
1886	4,580,000	69,200	1.51%
1887	4,626,000	84,500	1.83%
1888	4,678,000	88,800	1.9%
1889	4,729,000	91,600	1.94%
1890	4,779,000	75,100	1.57%
1891	4,833,000	82,200	1.7%
1892	4,883,000	31,000	0.63%
1893	4,931,000	29,600	0.6%
1894	4,979,000	20,800	0.42%
1895	5,026,000	18,800	0.37%
1896	5,074,000	16,800	0.33%
1897	5,122,000	21,700	0.42%

Annual immigration statistics 1898 to 1943
Year	Total population	Number of immigrants	Immigration rate
1898	5,175,000	31,900	0.62%
1899	5,235,000	44,500	0.85%
1900	5,301,000	41,700	0.79%
1901	5,371,000	55,700	1.04%
1902	5,494,000	89,100	1.62%
1903	5,651,000	138,700	2.45%
1904	5,827,000	131,300	2.25%
1905	6,002,000	141,500	2.36%
1906	6,097,000	211,700	3.47%
1907	6,411,000	272,400	4.25%
1908	6,625,000	143,300	2.16%
1909	6,800,000	173,700	2.55%
1910	6,988,000	286,800	4.1%
1911	7,207,000	331,300	4.6%
1912	7,389,000	375,800	5.09%
1913	7,632,000	400,900	5.25%
1914	7,879,000	150,500	1.91%
1915	7,981,000	36,700	0.46%
1916	8,001,000	55,900	0.7%
1917	8,060,000	72,900	0.9%
1918	8,148,000	41,800	0.51%
1919	8,311,000	107,700	1.3%
1920	8,556,000	138,800	1.62%
1921	8,788,000	91,700	1.04%
1922	8,919,000	64,200	0.72%
1923	9,010,000	133,700	1.48%
1924	9,143,000	124,200	1.36%
1925	9,294,000	84,900	0.91%
1926	9,451,000	135,100	1.43%
1927	9,637,000	158,900	1.65%
1928	9,835,000	166,800	1.7%
1929	10,029,000	165,000	1.65%
1930	10,208,000	104,800	1.03%
1931	10,377,000	27,500	0.27%
1932	10,510,000	20,600	0.2%
1933	10,633,000	14,400	0.14%
1934	10,741,000	12,500	0.12%
1935	10,845,000	11,300	0.1%
1936	10,950,000	11,600	0.11%
1937	11,045,000	15,100	0.14%
1938	11,152,000	17,200	0.15%
1939	11,267,000	17,000	0.15%
1940	11,381,000	11,300	0.1%
1941	11,507,000	9,300	0.08%
1942	11,654,000	7,600	0.07%
1943	11,795,000	8,500	0.07%

Annual immigration statistics 1944 to 1985
Year	Total population	Number of immigrants	Immigration rate
1944	11,946,000	12,800	0.11%
1945	12,072,000	22,700	0.19%
1946	12,292,000	71,700	0.58%
1947	12,551,000	64,100	0.51%
1948	12,823,000	125,400	0.98%
1949	13,447,000	95,200	0.71%
1950	13,712,000	73,900	0.54%
1951	14,009,000	194,400	1.39%
1952	14,459,000	164,500	1.14%
1953	14,845,000	168,900	1.14%
1954	15,287,000	154,200	1.01%
1955	15,698,000	109,900	0.7%
1956	16,081,000	164,900	1.03%
1957	16,610,000	282,200	1.7%
1958	17,080,000	124,900	0.73%
1959	17,483,000	106,900	0.61%
1960	17,870,000	104,100	0.58%
1961	18,238,000	71,700	0.39%
1962	18,583,000	74,600	0.4%
1963	18,931,000	93,200	0.49%
1964	19,291,000	112,600	0.58%
1965	19,644,000	146,800	0.75%
1966	20,015,000	194,700	0.97%
1967	20,378,000	222,900	1.09%
1968	20,701,000	184,000	0.89%
1969	21,001,000	161,500	0.77%
1970	21,297,000	147,700	0.69%
1971	21,962,032	121,900	0.56%
1972	22,218,463	122,000	0.55%
1973	22,491,777	184,200	0.82%
1974	22,807,969	218,500	0.96%
1975	23,143,275	187,900	0.81%
1976	23,449,808	149,400	0.64%
1977	23,725,843	114,900	0.48%
1978	23,963,203	86,300	0.36%
1979	24,201,544	112,100	0.46%
1980	24,515,667	143,100	0.58%
1981	24,819,915	128,600	0.52%
1982	25,116,942	121,200	0.48%
1983	25,366,451	89,200	0.35%
1984	25,607,053	88,300	0.34%
1985	25,842,116	84,300	0.33%

Annual immigration statistics 1986 to 2025
Year	Total population	Number of immigrants	Immigration rate
1986	26,100,278	99,400	0.38%
1987	26,446,601	152,100	0.58%
1988	26,791,747	161,600	0.6%
1989	27,276,781	191,600	0.7%
1990	27,691,138	216,500	0.78%
1991	28,037,420	232,800	0.83%
1992	28,371,264	254,800	0.9%
1993	28,684,764	256,600	0.89%
1994	29,000,663	224,400	0.77%
1995	29,302,311	212,900	0.73%
1996	29,610,218	226,100	0.76%
1997	29,905,948	216,000	0.72%
1998	30,155,173	174,200	0.58%
1999	30,401,286	190,000	0.62%
2000	30,685,730	227,500	0.74%
2001	31,020,855	250,600	0.81%
2002	31,359,199	229,000	0.73%
2003	31,642,461	221,300	0.7%
2004	31,938,807	235,800	0.74%
2005	32,242,732	262,200	0.81%
2006	32,571,193	251,600	0.77%
2007	32,888,886	236,800	0.72%
2008	33,247,298	247,200	0.74%
2009	33,630,069	252,200	0.75%
2010	34,005,902	280,700	0.83%
2011	34,339,221	248,700	0.72%
2012	34,713,395	257,900	0.74%
2013	35,080,992	259,000	0.74%
2014	35,434,066	260,400	0.73%
2015	35,704,498	271,850	0.76%
2016	36,110,803	296,350	0.82%
2017	36,545,075	286,480	0.78%
2018	37,072,620	321,040	0.87%
2019	37,618,495	341,180	0.91%
2020	38,028,638	184,605	0.49%
2021	38,239,864	406,055	1.06%
2022	38,950,132	437,635	1.12%
2023	40,049,088	471,820	1.18%
2024	41,262,329	483,655	1.17%
2025	41,651,653	393,530	0.94%

== 2020s ==
During the 2020s (up to March 2026/Q1), 2,460,360 immigrants have arrived in Canada. Furthermore, the top ten source countries for immigrants to Canada during the 2020s include India (676,615 persons or 27.5 percent), China (166,960 persons or 6.79 percent), Philippines (141,825 persons or 5.76 percent), Nigeria (102,570 persons or 4.17 percent), Afghanistan (75,705 persons or 3.08 percent), Cameroon (70,090 persons or 2.85 percent), France (65,670 persons or 2.67 percent), Pakistan (60,845 persons or 2.47 percent), United States (57,955 persons or 2.36 percent), and Iran (57,140 persons or 2.32 percent).

Between March 17, 2022 and April 1, 2024, 298,128 Ukrainians arrived in Canada, the vast majority of whom were not counted in the official immigration statistics for each calendar year, instead arriving under temporary resident visas.

Immigrant arrivals during the 2020s (2020–2026) by top 50 countries of citizenship
Country	Total 2020s		2020		2021		2022		2023		2024		2025		2026 (up to March/Q1)	
Country	Pop.	%	Pop.	%	Pop.	%	Pop.	%	Pop.	%	Pop.	%	Pop.	%	Pop.	%
India	676,615	27.5%	42,875	23.23%	127,945	31.51%	118,250	27.02%	139,790	29.63%	127,375	26.34%	98,830	25.11%	21,550	25.95%
China (Note: Officially, the People's Republic of China. Excludes Hong Kong, Macau, and Taiwan (listed separately).)	166,960	6.79%	16,525	8.95%	31,015	7.64%	31,865	7.28%	31,785	6.74%	29,970	6.2%	21,115	5.37%	4,685	5.64%
Philippines	141,825	5.76%	10,975	5.95%	18,020	4.44%	22,095	5.05%	26,965	5.72%	32,320	6.68%	25,230	6.41%	6,220	7.49%
Nigeria	102,570	4.17%	6,360	3.45%	15,595	3.84%	22,130	5.06%	17,465	3.7%	20,395	4.22%	16,355	4.16%	4,270	5.14%
Afghanistan	75,705	3.08%	1,660	0.9%	8,570	2.11%	23,750	5.43%	20,180	4.28%	12,285	2.54%	8,215	2.09%	1,045	1.26%
Cameroon	70,090	2.85%	1,595	0.86%	2,565	0.63%	6,270	1.43%	11,685	2.48%	21,205	4.38%	22,925	5.83%	3,845	4.63%
France	65,670	2.67%	4,605	2.49%	12,690	3.13%	14,150	3.23%	10,075	2.14%	9,945	2.06%	11,970	3.04%	2,235	2.69%
Pakistan	60,845	2.47%	6,230	3.37%	8,480	2.09%	11,600	2.65%	11,860	2.51%	11,960	2.47%	8,890	2.26%	1,825	2.2%
United States	57,955	2.36%	6,380	3.46%	11,955	2.94%	10,415	2.38%	10,640	2.26%	9,330	1.93%	7,520	1.91%	1,715	2.06%
Iran	57,140	2.32%	3,815	2.07%	11,305	2.78%	11,110	2.54%	10,680	2.26%	11,150	2.31%	7,435	1.89%	1,645	1.98%
Eritrea	56,715	2.31%	2,645	1.43%	5,380	1.32%	7,660	1.75%	10,680	2.26%	16,600	3.43%	12,350	3.14%	1,400	1.69%
Brazil	42,045	1.71%	3,695	2%	11,425	2.81%	7,335	1.68%	7,225	1.53%	5,985	1.24%	5,110	1.3%	1,270	1.53%
Syria	41,175	1.67%	4,880	2.64%	5,590	1.38%	8,510	1.94%	9,345	1.98%	7,750	1.6%	4,310	1.1%	790	0.95%
Morocco	34,595	1.41%	2,980	1.61%	2,950	0.73%	6,390	1.46%	6,410	1.36%	7,635	1.58%	6,925	1.76%	1,305	1.57%
Algeria	34,400	1.4%	2,720	1.47%	3,080	0.76%	6,175	1.41%	5,245	1.11%	8,255	1.71%	7,600	1.93%	1,325	1.6%
Vietnam	32,180	1.31%	2,610	1.41%	5,755	1.42%	5,460	1.25%	6,605	1.4%	6,715	1.39%	4,030	1.02%	1,005	1.21%
Mexico	31,830	1.29%	2,430	1.32%	5,145	1.27%	5,220	1.19%	5,735	1.22%	6,415	1.33%	5,420	1.38%	1,465	1.76%
Colombia	30,970	1.26%	1,520	0.82%	4,055	1%	3,775	0.86%	4,660	0.99%	8,865	1.83%	6,495	1.65%	1,600	1.93%
South Korea	29,445	1.2%	3,285	1.78%	8,240	2.03%	5,455	1.25%	5,205	1.1%	4,365	0.9%	2,425	0.62%	470	0.57%
Ukraine	28,965	1.18%	1,675	0.91%	3,190	0.79%	3,575	0.82%	3,110	0.66%	6,780	1.4%	8,365	2.13%	2,270	2.73%
United Kingdom (Note: Officially, the United Kingdom of Great Britain and Northern Ireland. Includes England, Scotland, Wales, Northern Ireland, and certain British Overseas Territories not otherwise listed separately. Historically also included certain Crown Colonies not otherwise listed separately.)	27,830	1.13%	3,410	1.85%	6,560	1.62%	4,495	1.03%	4,990	1.06%	4,135	0.85%	3,340	0.85%	900	1.08%
Tunisia	24,095	0.98%	1,435	0.78%	2,640	0.65%	4,680	1.07%	3,470	0.74%	5,710	1.18%	5,245	1.33%	915	1.1%
Haiti	22,985	0.93%	990	0.54%	2,870	0.71%	4,400	1.01%	3,020	0.64%	5,180	1.07%	5,370	1.36%	1,155	1.39%
Somalia	22,410	0.91%	1,010	0.55%	2,075	0.51%	2,940	0.67%	5,170	1.1%	5,805	1.2%	4,845	1.23%	565	0.68%
Bangladesh	22,250	0.9%	1,620	0.88%	3,000	0.74%	4,055	0.93%	5,020	1.06%	4,535	0.94%	3,170	0.81%	850	1.02%
Jamaica	22,060	0.9%	2,030	1.1%	4,045	1%	4,245	0.97%	4,340	0.92%	3,720	0.77%	2,980	0.76%	700	0.84%
DR Congo	20,555	0.84%	865	0.47%	1,820	0.45%	3,250	0.74%	5,320	1.13%	4,380	0.91%	4,275	1.09%	645	0.78%
Ethiopia	18,975	0.77%	1,100	0.6%	2,150	0.53%	2,665	0.61%	3,820	0.81%	4,245	0.88%	4,440	1.13%	555	0.67%
Lebanon	18,705	0.76%	1,280	0.69%	1,830	0.45%	4,095	0.94%	4,555	0.97%	4,330	0.9%	2,230	0.57%	385	0.46%
Hong Kong	18,435	0.75%	1,045	0.57%	2,290	0.56%	3,695	0.84%	7,535	1.6%	3,510	0.73%	300	0.08%	60	0.07%
Sri Lanka	16,250	0.66%	1,340	0.73%	2,030	0.5%	2,510	0.57%	2,710	0.57%	3,805	0.79%	3,090	0.79%	765	0.92%
Turkey	16,205	0.66%	2,120	1.15%	4,625	1.14%	2,420	0.55%	2,070	0.44%	2,450	0.51%	1,895	0.48%	625	0.75%
Egypt	15,490	0.63%	1,905	1.03%	3,220	0.79%	2,890	0.66%	2,515	0.53%	2,620	0.54%	1,950	0.5%	390	0.47%
Ivory Coast	14,925	0.61%	1,195	0.65%	1,110	0.27%	2,990	0.68%	2,585	0.55%	3,145	0.65%	3,305	0.84%	595	0.72%
Iraq	14,350	0.58%	1,950	1.06%	2,690	0.66%	3,475	0.79%	2,335	0.49%	1,660	0.34%	1,905	0.48%	335	0.4%
Sudan	13,710	0.56%	845	0.46%	1,745	0.43%	1,575	0.36%	2,010	0.43%	1,950	0.4%	4,695	1.19%	890	1.07%
Venezuela	11,430	0.46%	1,055	0.57%	2,625	0.65%	1,545	0.35%	1,390	0.29%	3,245	0.67%	1,275	0.32%	295	0.36%
Russia	9,910	0.4%	1,390	0.75%	2,005	0.49%	1,620	0.37%	1,770	0.38%	1,810	0.37%	1,110	0.28%	205	0.25%
South Africa	9,450	0.38%	1,125	0.61%	1,620	0.4%	1,745	0.4%	2,065	0.44%	1,590	0.33%	1,110	0.28%	195	0.23%
Nepal	9,415	0.38%	565	0.31%	1,020	0.25%	1,440	0.33%	1,760	0.37%	2,005	0.41%	2,005	0.51%	620	0.75%
Ghana	8,390	0.34%	545	0.3%	1,055	0.26%	1,240	0.28%	1,645	0.35%	1,610	0.33%	1,805	0.46%	490	0.59%
Stateless	8,210	0.33%	525	0.28%	1,110	0.27%	915	0.21%	1,080	0.23%	2,000	0.41%	2,400	0.61%	180	0.22%
Australia	7,680	0.31%	1,180	0.64%	2,080	0.51%	1,265	0.29%	1,260	0.27%	1,000	0.21%	725	0.18%	170	0.2%
Burundi	7,510	0.31%	805	0.44%	1,265	0.31%	1,580	0.36%	1,030	0.22%	1,285	0.27%	1,230	0.31%	315	0.38%
Ireland	7,475	0.3%	1,030	0.56%	2,685	0.66%	945	0.22%	1,010	0.21%	830	0.17%	800	0.2%	175	0.21%
Mauritius	6,905	0.28%	420	0.23%	690	0.17%	1,020	0.23%	1,155	0.24%	1,710	0.35%	1,635	0.42%	275	0.33%
Italy	6,415	0.26%	760	0.41%	1,720	0.42%	1,095	0.25%	1,210	0.26%	840	0.17%	635	0.16%	155	0.19%
Jordan	6,215	0.25%	535	0.29%	950	0.23%	1,140	0.26%	1,265	0.27%	1,270	0.26%	890	0.23%	165	0.2%
Taiwan	6,175	0.25%	575	0.31%	1,250	0.31%	1,035	0.24%	1,075	0.23%	1,250	0.26%	790	0.2%	200	0.24%
Germany	6,070	0.25%	785	0.43%	1,445	0.36%	900	0.21%	1,155	0.24%	930	0.19%	685	0.17%	170	0.2%
Others	202,175	8.22%	19,695	10.67%	36,840	9.07%	34,540	7.89%	36,070	7.64%	35,790	7.4%	32,090	8.15%	7,150	8.61%
Total	2,460,360	100%	184,605	100%	406,055	100%	437,635	100%	471,820	100%	483,655	100%	393,530	100%	83,060	100%

== 2010s ==
Immigrants by country of origin (2010s)
1. India (15.9%)
2. Philippines (13.3%)
3. China (10.2%)
4. Pakistan (3.46%)
5. United States (3.10%)
6. Iran (3.01%)
7. Syria (3.00%)
8. United Kingdom (2.14%)
9. Nigeria (1.99%)
10. Other (43.9%)

During the 2010s, 2,823,572 immigrants arrived in Canada. Furthermore, the top ten source countries for immigrants to Canada during the 2010s included India (450,257 persons or 16.0 percent), Philippines (375,703 persons or 13.3 percent), China (287,084 persons or 10.2 percent), Pakistan (97,801 persons or 3.46 percent), United States (87,623 persons or 3.10 percent), Iran (84,952 persons or 3.01 percent), Syria (84,828 persons or 3 percent), United Kingdom (60,361 persons or 2.14 percent), Nigeria (56,251 persons or 1.99 percent), and France (55,338 persons or 1.96 percent).

Immigrant arrivals during the 2010s (2010–2019) by top 50 countries of citizenship
Country	Total 2010s		2010		2011		2012		2013		2014		2015		2016		2017		2018		2019	
Country	Pop.	%	Pop.	%	Pop.	%	Pop.	%	Pop.	%	Pop.	%	Pop.	%	Pop.	%	Pop.	%	Pop.	%	Pop.	%
India	450,257	15.95%	34,226	12.19%	27,488	11.05%	30,920	11.99%	33,078	12.77%	38,330	14.73%	39,340	14.47%	39,710	13.4%	51,590	18%	69,985	21.8%	85,590	25.09%
Philippines	375,703	13.31%	38,614	13.75%	36,759	14.78%	34,301	13.3%	29,532	11.4%	40,032	15.38%	50,840	18.7%	41,850	14.12%	40,905	14.28%	35,050	10.92%	27,820	8.15%
China	287,084	10.17%	30,381	10.82%	28,491	11.45%	33,011	12.8%	34,115	13.17%	24,626	9.46%	19,460	7.16%	26,790	9.04%	30,250	10.56%	29,715	9.26%	30,245	8.86%
Pakistan	97,801	3.46%	6,812	2.43%	7,467	3%	11,208	4.35%	12,611	4.87%	9,113	3.5%	11,300	4.16%	11,350	3.83%	7,655	2.67%	9,490	2.96%	10,795	3.16%
United States	87,623	3.1%	8,142	2.9%	7,674	3.09%	7,870	3.05%	8,486	3.28%	8,491	3.26%	7,655	2.82%	8,485	2.86%	9,140	3.19%	10,900	3.4%	10,780	3.16%
Iran	84,952	3.01%	7,478	2.66%	7,479	3.01%	7,525	2.92%	11,288	4.36%	16,772	6.44%	11,640	4.28%	6,475	2.18%	4,730	1.65%	5,510	1.72%	6,055	1.77%
Syria	84,828	3%	1,040	0.37%	1,005	0.4%	649	0.25%	1,008	0.39%	2,051	0.79%	9,850	3.62%	35,000	11.81%	12,060	4.21%	12,045	3.75%	10,120	2.97%
United Kingdom	60,361	2.14%	8,719	3.11%	6,128	2.46%	6,172	2.39%	5,814	2.24%	5,758	2.21%	5,360	1.97%	5,805	1.96%	5,310	1.85%	5,660	1.76%	5,635	1.65%
Nigeria	56,251	1.99%	3,907	1.39%	3,102	1.25%	3,441	1.33%	4,171	1.61%	4,160	1.6%	4,090	1.5%	4,415	1.49%	5,445	1.9%	10,920	3.4%	12,600	3.69%
France	55,338	1.96%	4,648	1.66%	4,080	1.64%	6,271	2.43%	5,623	2.17%	4,716	1.81%	5,850	2.15%	6,390	2.16%	6,625	2.31%	6,175	1.92%	4,960	1.45%
South Korea	47,402	1.68%	5,537	1.97%	4,588	1.84%	5,315	2.06%	4,509	1.74%	4,458	1.71%	4,105	1.51%	4,010	1.35%	3,980	1.39%	4,800	1.5%	6,100	1.79%
Iraq	45,884	1.63%	5,941	2.12%	6,196	2.49%	4,036	1.57%	4,912	1.9%	3,894	1.5%	3,975	1.46%	2,415	0.81%	4,740	1.65%	5,330	1.66%	4,445	1.3%
Egypt	40,401	1.43%	5,984	2.13%	4,663	1.87%	5,550	2.15%	4,165	1.61%	3,159	1.21%	3,760	1.38%	3,085	1.04%	2,865	1%	3,515	1.09%	3,655	1.07%
Mexico	37,024	1.31%	3,862	1.38%	3,948	1.59%	4,227	1.64%	3,995	1.54%	4,477	1.72%	3,220	1.18%	3,390	1.14%	3,135	1.09%	3,310	1.03%	3,460	1.01%
Haiti	36,077	1.28%	4,733	1.69%	6,476	2.6%	5,856	2.27%	4,147	1.6%	3,315	1.27%	2,720	1%	2,930	0.99%	2,345	0.82%	2,100	0.65%	1,455	0.43%
Algeria	36,034	1.28%	4,753	1.69%	4,326	1.74%	3,762	1.46%	4,325	1.67%	3,653	1.4%	2,830	1.04%	2,820	0.95%	2,635	0.92%	3,225	1%	3,705	1.09%
Morocco	33,165	1.17%	6,244	2.22%	4,391	1.77%	3,878	1.5%	3,276	1.26%	2,491	0.96%	2,705	1%	2,110	0.71%	2,265	0.79%	2,780	0.87%	3,025	0.89%
Bangladesh	32,399	1.15%	4,721	1.68%	2,694	1.08%	2,634	1.02%	3,792	1.46%	2,233	0.86%	3,305	1.22%	3,230	1.09%	3,190	1.11%	3,205	1%	3,395	1%
Eritrea	31,421	1.11%	931	0.33%	1,182	0.48%	1,335	0.52%	1,719	0.66%	1,974	0.76%	2,210	0.81%	4,655	1.57%	4,690	1.64%	5,695	1.77%	7,030	2.06%
Colombia	31,206	1.11%	5,218	1.86%	4,366	1.76%	3,736	1.45%	3,632	1.4%	2,859	1.1%	2,180	0.8%	2,435	0.82%	2,235	0.78%	2,270	0.71%	2,275	0.67%
Jamaica	30,744	1.09%	2,321	0.83%	2,059	0.83%	2,174	0.84%	2,480	0.96%	3,050	1.17%	3,415	1.26%	3,560	1.2%	3,830	1.34%	3,875	1.21%	3,980	1.17%
Ukraine	28,096	1%	3,159	1.13%	2,516	1.01%	2,263	0.88%	2,484	0.96%	2,539	0.98%	2,345	0.86%	3,350	1.13%	3,310	1.16%	3,135	0.98%	2,995	0.88%
Afghanistan	26,284	0.93%	1,758	0.63%	2,204	0.89%	2,635	1.02%	2,003	0.77%	1,489	0.57%	2,630	0.97%	2,650	0.89%	3,455	1.21%	3,560	1.11%	3,900	1.14%
Sri Lanka	25,931	0.92%	4,420	1.57%	3,310	1.33%	3,338	1.29%	2,394	0.92%	2,604	1%	1,785	0.66%	1,535	0.52%	2,150	0.75%	2,160	0.67%	2,235	0.66%
Brazil	24,835	0.88%	2,598	0.93%	1,508	0.61%	1,641	0.64%	1,712	0.66%	1,916	0.74%	1,730	0.64%	1,730	0.58%	2,760	0.96%	3,950	1.23%	5,290	1.55%
Vietnam	24,823	0.88%	1,942	0.69%	1,723	0.69%	1,732	0.67%	2,112	0.82%	2,494	0.96%	2,595	0.95%	2,450	0.83%	2,505	0.87%	3,050	0.95%	4,220	1.24%
Cameroon	22,126	0.78%	1,802	0.64%	1,636	0.66%	2,503	0.97%	2,438	0.94%	2,107	0.81%	2,030	0.75%	2,100	0.71%	2,285	0.8%	2,275	0.71%	2,950	0.86%
Russia	21,792	0.77%	2,288	0.82%	1,963	0.79%	2,077	0.81%	2,462	0.95%	1,772	0.68%	2,125	0.78%	2,405	0.81%	2,290	0.8%	2,145	0.67%	2,265	0.66%
Lebanon	21,372	0.76%	3,433	1.22%	3,071	1.23%	1,614	0.63%	2,175	0.84%	2,224	0.85%	2,110	0.78%	1,910	0.64%	1,365	0.48%	1,505	0.47%	1,965	0.58%
Israel	20,289	0.72%	2,756	0.98%	1,967	0.79%	2,132	0.83%	1,945	0.75%	1,899	0.73%	2,165	0.8%	2,445	0.82%	1,870	0.65%	1,795	0.56%	1,315	0.39%
DR Congo	19,155	0.68%	1,238	0.44%	1,217	0.49%	1,711	0.66%	2,050	0.79%	1,749	0.67%	1,675	0.62%	2,480	0.84%	2,355	0.82%	2,385	0.74%	2,295	0.67%
Ethiopia	18,529	0.66%	1,865	0.66%	2,163	0.87%	1,859	0.72%	1,608	0.62%	1,339	0.51%	1,355	0.5%	1,930	0.65%	1,910	0.67%	2,025	0.63%	2,475	0.73%
Somalia	17,438	0.62%	1,526	0.54%	1,532	0.62%	1,574	0.61%	2,030	0.78%	1,491	0.57%	1,160	0.43%	1,315	0.44%	1,390	0.49%	2,145	0.67%	3,275	0.96%
Germany	15,589	0.55%	2,955	1.05%	2,016	0.81%	1,699	0.66%	1,216	0.47%	1,273	0.49%	1,275	0.47%	1,210	0.41%	1,145	0.4%	1,280	0.4%	1,520	0.45%
Tunisia	15,263	0.54%	1,299	0.46%	1,443	0.58%	1,495	0.58%	1,624	0.63%	1,472	0.57%	1,280	0.47%	1,305	0.44%	1,430	0.5%	1,935	0.6%	1,980	0.58%
Ireland	14,554	0.52%	548	0.2%	524	0.21%	725	0.28%	1,015	0.39%	1,977	0.76%	2,150	0.79%	2,250	0.76%	1,975	0.69%	1,775	0.55%	1,615	0.47%
Australia	14,536	0.51%	933	0.33%	850	0.34%	983	0.38%	1,120	0.43%	1,295	0.5%	1,470	0.54%	1,705	0.58%	1,865	0.65%	2,175	0.68%	2,140	0.63%
Romania	13,356	0.47%	1,922	0.68%	1,776	0.71%	1,588	0.62%	1,512	0.58%	1,553	0.6%	1,180	0.43%	1,360	0.46%	980	0.34%	810	0.25%	675	0.2%
Ivory Coast	13,272	0.47%	1,067	0.38%	636	0.26%	1,023	0.4%	1,170	0.45%	1,521	0.58%	1,370	0.5%	1,760	0.59%	1,405	0.49%	1,470	0.46%	1,850	0.54%
Turkey	13,071	0.46%	1,492	0.53%	1,255	0.5%	1,068	0.41%	729	0.28%	717	0.28%	870	0.32%	920	0.31%	1,110	0.39%	2,080	0.65%	2,830	0.83%
South Africa	12,861	0.46%	1,239	0.44%	959	0.39%	1,244	0.48%	1,238	0.48%	1,001	0.38%	945	0.35%	1,070	0.36%	1,555	0.54%	1,820	0.57%	1,790	0.52%
Nepal	12,433	0.44%	1,392	0.5%	1,129	0.45%	1,185	0.46%	1,308	0.5%	1,219	0.47%	1,525	0.56%	755	0.25%	1,110	0.39%	1,400	0.44%	1,410	0.41%
Venezuela	12,360	0.44%	998	0.36%	1,451	0.58%	1,366	0.53%	1,022	0.39%	1,483	0.57%	915	0.34%	1,010	0.34%	1,010	0.35%	1,525	0.47%	1,580	0.46%
Jordan	11,900	0.42%	1,831	0.65%	1,635	0.66%	1,206	0.47%	1,255	0.48%	1,158	0.44%	1,115	0.41%	920	0.31%	790	0.28%	985	0.31%	1,005	0.29%
Japan	11,017	0.39%	1,167	0.42%	1,265	0.51%	1,210	0.47%	983	0.38%	1,127	0.43%	995	0.37%	1,035	0.35%	1,085	0.38%	1,035	0.32%	1,115	0.33%
Taiwan	10,957	0.39%	2,629	0.94%	1,703	0.68%	985	0.38%	768	0.3%	692	0.27%	625	0.23%	790	0.27%	795	0.28%	955	0.3%	1,015	0.3%
Moldova	10,319	0.37%	1,988	0.71%	1,367	0.55%	1,416	0.55%	1,232	0.48%	941	0.36%	925	0.34%	1,090	0.37%	680	0.24%	405	0.13%	275	0.08%
Hong Kong	9,969	0.35%	623	0.22%	586	0.24%	719	0.28%	775	0.3%	586	0.23%	895	0.33%	1,360	0.46%	1,360	0.47%	1,525	0.47%	1,540	0.45%
Cuba	9,901	0.35%	963	0.34%	961	0.39%	1,301	0.5%	1,402	0.54%	1,079	0.41%	825	0.3%	1,115	0.38%	880	0.31%	780	0.24%	595	0.17%
Poland	8,700	0.31%	795	0.28%	720	0.29%	779	0.3%	853	0.33%	773	0.3%	975	0.36%	1,000	0.34%	995	0.35%	905	0.28%	905	0.27%
Others	300,794	10.65%	33,892	12.07%	29,084	11.69%	28,867	11.2%	27,726	10.7%	27,180	10.44%	28,985	10.66%	28,500	9.62%	29,055	10.14%	32,470	10.11%	35,035	10.27%
Total	2,823,572	100%	280,730	100%	248,732	100%	257,809	100%	259,039	100%	260,282	100%	271,840	100%	296,375	100%	286,535	100%	321,055	100%	341,175	100%

== 2000s ==
Immigrants by country of origin (2000s)
1. China (14.1%)
2. India (12.6%)
3. Philippines (7.16%)
4. Pakistan (5.28%)
5. United States (3.11%)
6. South Korea (2.82%)
7. Iran (2.72%)
8. United Kingdom (2.71%)
9. Sri Lanka (2.05%)
10. Other (47.5%)

During the 2000s, 2,414,639 immigrants arrived in Canada. Furthermore, the top ten source countries for immigrants to Canada during the 2000s included China (340,161 persons or 14.1 percent), India (303,359 persons or 12.6 percent), Philippines (172,857 persons or 7.16 percent), Pakistan (127,559 persons or 5.28 percent), the United States (75,163 persons or 3.11 percent), South Korea (68,121 persons or 2.82 percent), Iran (65,781 persons or 2.72 percent), United Kingdom (65,337 persons or 2.71 percent), Sri Lanka (49,544 persons or 2.05 percent), and Colombia (45,813 persons or 1.9 percent).

Immigrant arrivals during the 2000s (2000–2009) by top 50 countries of citizenship
Country	Total 2000s		2000		2001		2002		2003		2004		2005		2006		2007		2008		2009	
Country	Pop.	%	Pop.	%	Pop.	%	Pop.	%	Pop.	%	Pop.	%	Pop.	%	Pop.	%	Pop.	%	Pop.	%	Pop.	%
China	340,161	14.09%	35,499	15.61%	36,420	14.53%	31,924	13.93%	36,406	16.44%	36,568	15.5%	42,568	16.23%	33,493	13.31%	27,630	11.67%	30,031	12.15%	29,622	11.74%
India	303,359	12.56%	28,535	12.54%	31,204	12.45%	31,894	13.92%	27,135	12.26%	28,199	11.96%	36,179	13.8%	33,773	13.42%	28,731	12.13%	28,257	11.43%	29,452	11.68%
Philippines	172,857	7.16%	10,731	4.72%	13,833	5.52%	11,705	5.11%	12,759	5.76%	14,003	5.94%	18,137	6.92%	18,400	7.31%	19,833	8.38%	24,884	10.06%	28,572	11.33%
Pakistan	127,559	5.28%	15,395	6.77%	16,705	6.66%	15,092	6.59%	13,204	5.96%	13,399	5.68%	14,314	5.46%	13,128	5.22%	10,123	4.28%	8,984	3.63%	7,215	2.86%
United States	75,163	3.11%	5,429	2.39%	5,602	2.23%	4,949	2.16%	5,543	2.5%	6,994	2.97%	8,392	3.2%	9,612	3.82%	9,460	4%	10,187	4.12%	8,995	3.57%
South Korea	68,121	2.82%	7,615	3.35%	9,612	3.83%	7,323	3.2%	7,110	3.21%	5,348	2.27%	5,826	2.22%	6,210	2.47%	5,912	2.5%	7,291	2.95%	5,874	2.33%
Iran	65,781	2.72%	5,878	2.58%	6,168	2.46%	8,122	3.54%	5,917	2.67%	6,349	2.69%	5,837	2.23%	7,481	2.97%	6,974	2.95%	6,474	2.62%	6,581	2.61%
United Kingdom	65,337	2.71%	4,649	2.04%	5,360	2.14%	4,724	2.06%	5,199	2.35%	6,062	2.57%	5,864	2.24%	6,541	2.6%	8,129	3.43%	9,243	3.74%	9,566	3.79%
Sri Lanka	49,544	2.05%	6,077	2.67%	5,860	2.34%	5,272	2.3%	4,886	2.21%	4,489	1.9%	4,918	1.88%	4,651	1.85%	4,097	1.73%	4,751	1.92%	4,543	1.8%
Colombia	45,813	1.9%	2,260	0.99%	2,966	1.18%	3,284	1.43%	4,317	1.95%	4,565	1.94%	6,424	2.45%	6,535	2.6%	5,358	2.26%	5,449	2.2%	4,655	1.85%
Romania	45,504	1.88%	4,532	1.99%	5,651	2.25%	5,764	2.52%	5,540	2.5%	5,755	2.44%	5,048	1.92%	4,468	1.78%	3,834	1.62%	2,836	1.15%	2,076	0.82%
France	41,289	1.71%	3,763	1.65%	3,805	1.52%	3,464	1.51%	3,565	1.61%	4,392	1.86%	4,429	1.69%	3,999	1.59%	4,289	1.81%	4,532	1.83%	5,051	2%
Morocco	37,995	1.57%	2,665	1.17%	4,067	1.62%	4,173	1.82%	3,369	1.52%	3,685	1.56%	2,939	1.12%	3,321	1.32%	4,019	1.7%	4,225	1.71%	5,532	2.19%
Algeria	37,829	1.57%	2,865	1.26%	3,418	1.36%	3,406	1.49%	3,071	1.39%	3,617	1.53%	3,625	1.38%	4,806	1.91%	3,623	1.53%	4,007	1.62%	5,391	2.14%
Russia	35,535	1.47%	3,840	1.69%	4,353	1.74%	3,941	1.72%	3,719	1.68%	3,989	1.69%	3,972	1.51%	3,117	1.24%	2,983	1.26%	2,690	1.09%	2,931	1.16%
Lebanon	30,892	1.28%	1,902	0.84%	2,573	1.03%	2,330	1.02%	3,177	1.43%	3,290	1.39%	3,708	1.41%	3,802	1.51%	3,467	1.46%	3,565	1.44%	3,078	1.22%
Bangladesh	30,816	1.28%	3,117	1.37%	3,832	1.53%	2,944	1.28%	2,138	0.97%	2,660	1.13%	4,171	1.59%	4,012	1.59%	2,897	1.22%	2,939	1.19%	2,106	0.83%
Afghanistan	30,499	1.26%	3,325	1.46%	4,067	1.62%	3,697	1.61%	3,479	1.57%	2,978	1.26%	3,436	1.31%	3,010	1.2%	2,652	1.12%	2,110	0.85%	1,745	0.69%
Taiwan	27,832	1.15%	3,534	1.55%	3,130	1.25%	2,851	1.24%	2,158	0.97%	2,009	0.85%	3,097	1.18%	2,818	1.12%	2,767	1.17%	2,993	1.21%	2,475	0.98%
Iraq	26,564	1.1%	2,589	1.14%	2,818	1.12%	2,433	1.06%	1,513	0.68%	1,796	0.76%	2,226	0.85%	1,788	0.71%	2,406	1.02%	3,543	1.43%	5,452	2.16%
Ukraine	26,317	1.09%	3,345	1.47%	3,513	1.4%	3,515	1.53%	2,757	1.25%	2,431	1.03%	2,269	0.87%	1,970	0.78%	2,218	0.94%	1,935	0.78%	2,364	0.94%
Israel	24,925	1.03%	2,508	1.1%	2,435	0.97%	2,539	1.11%	2,315	1.05%	2,788	1.18%	2,446	0.93%	2,618	1.04%	2,401	1.01%	2,559	1.03%	2,316	0.92%
Egypt	24,787	1.03%	1,640	0.72%	2,594	1.03%	2,041	0.89%	2,237	1.01%	2,393	1.01%	2,495	0.95%	2,190	0.87%	2,355	0.99%	3,347	1.35%	3,495	1.39%
Mexico	24,364	1.01%	1,653	0.73%	1,939	0.77%	1,894	0.83%	1,754	0.79%	2,257	0.96%	2,837	1.08%	2,844	1.13%	3,240	1.37%	2,854	1.15%	3,092	1.23%
Germany	23,572	0.98%	1,702	0.75%	1,455	0.58%	1,375	0.6%	1,860	0.84%	2,019	0.86%	2,226	0.85%	2,767	1.1%	2,448	1.03%	3,834	1.55%	3,886	1.54%
Jamaica	22,721	0.94%	2,477	1.09%	2,834	1.13%	2,520	1.1%	2,054	0.93%	2,237	0.95%	1,945	0.74%	1,722	0.68%	2,141	0.9%	2,334	0.94%	2,457	0.97%
Vietnam	21,253	0.88%	1,797	0.79%	2,114	0.84%	2,286	1%	1,709	0.77%	1,814	0.77%	1,852	0.71%	3,152	1.25%	2,574	1.09%	1,784	0.72%	2,171	0.86%
Haiti	19,279	0.8%	1,628	0.72%	2,433	0.97%	2,172	0.95%	1,929	0.87%	1,652	0.7%	1,681	0.64%	1,619	0.64%	1,598	0.67%	2,488	1.01%	2,079	0.82%
Nigeria	19,058	0.79%	1,181	0.52%	1,426	0.57%	1,403	0.61%	1,065	0.48%	1,519	0.64%	2,236	0.85%	2,593	1.03%	2,371	1%	2,108	0.85%	3,156	1.25%
Jordan	16,258	0.67%	1,510	0.66%	1,903	0.76%	1,505	0.66%	1,604	0.72%	1,736	0.74%	1,939	0.74%	1,826	0.73%	1,421	0.6%	1,579	0.64%	1,235	0.49%
Hong Kong	16,041	0.66%	2,865	1.26%	1,965	0.78%	1,541	0.67%	1,472	0.66%	1,547	0.66%	1,783	0.68%	1,489	0.59%	1,131	0.48%	1,324	0.54%	924	0.37%
Turkey	14,169	0.59%	1,101	0.48%	1,184	0.47%	1,293	0.56%	1,336	0.6%	1,736	0.74%	2,064	0.79%	1,632	0.65%	1,463	0.62%	1,122	0.45%	1,238	0.49%
DR Congo	13,834	0.57%	1,228	0.54%	1,243	0.5%	1,100	0.48%	1,233	0.56%	1,459	0.62%	1,508	0.58%	1,621	0.64%	1,466	0.62%	1,396	0.56%	1,580	0.63%
Poland	13,629	0.56%	1,469	0.65%	1,602	0.64%	1,448	0.63%	1,394	0.63%	1,533	0.65%	1,405	0.54%	1,263	0.5%	1,235	0.52%	1,267	0.51%	1,013	0.4%
Bulgaria	13,604	0.56%	1,170	0.51%	1,283	0.51%	1,517	0.66%	1,507	0.68%	2,021	0.86%	1,737	0.66%	1,419	0.56%	1,172	0.5%	994	0.4%	784	0.31%
Ethiopia	13,593	0.56%	1,071	0.47%	1,061	0.42%	818	0.36%	1,397	0.63%	1,536	0.65%	1,505	0.57%	1,799	0.71%	1,508	0.64%	1,611	0.65%	1,287	0.51%
Guyana	13,332	0.55%	1,301	0.57%	1,706	0.68%	1,478	0.65%	1,411	0.64%	1,341	0.57%	1,215	0.46%	1,286	0.51%	1,277	0.54%	1,137	0.46%	1,180	0.47%
South Africa	13,192	0.55%	1,762	0.77%	1,899	0.76%	1,500	0.65%	1,245	0.56%	1,175	0.5%	988	0.38%	1,111	0.44%	1,200	0.51%	1,122	0.45%	1,190	0.47%
Brazil	12,734	0.53%	844	0.37%	847	0.34%	745	0.33%	839	0.38%	917	0.39%	969	0.37%	1,181	0.47%	1,745	0.74%	2,137	0.86%	2,510	1%
Peru	12,371	0.51%	594	0.26%	849	0.34%	854	0.37%	1,023	0.46%	1,457	0.62%	1,653	0.63%	1,473	0.59%	1,490	0.63%	1,094	0.44%	1,884	0.75%
Yugoslavia	11,475	0.48%	4,746	2.09%	2,758	1.1%	1,590	0.69%	940	0.42%	732	0.31%	329	0.13%	138	0.05%	99	0.04%	95	0.04%	48	0.02%
Somalia	11,405	0.47%	1,562	0.69%	1,155	0.46%	723	0.32%	955	0.43%	1,362	0.58%	1,198	0.46%	1,061	0.42%	1,161	0.49%	1,014	0.41%	1,214	0.48%
Sudan	11,283	0.47%	911	0.4%	1,104	0.44%	1,496	0.65%	1,870	0.84%	1,827	0.77%	1,310	0.5%	1,039	0.41%	684	0.29%	620	0.25%	422	0.17%
Stateless	11,147	0.46%	2,338	1.03%	2,040	0.81%	1,435	0.63%	922	0.42%	920	0.39%	837	0.32%	839	0.33%	653	0.28%	622	0.25%	541	0.21%
Albania	10,797	0.45%	1,816	0.8%	1,602	0.64%	1,021	0.45%	853	0.39%	1,449	0.61%	1,223	0.47%	856	0.34%	702	0.3%	560	0.23%	715	0.28%
Japan	10,703	0.44%	1,010	0.44%	1,092	0.44%	806	0.35%	816	0.37%	973	0.41%	1,067	0.41%	1,212	0.48%	1,250	0.53%	1,284	0.52%	1,193	0.47%
Syria	10,640	0.44%	923	0.41%	1,066	0.43%	957	0.42%	1,083	0.49%	1,116	0.47%	1,458	0.56%	1,145	0.45%	1,056	0.45%	919	0.37%	917	0.36%
Cuba	10,515	0.44%	814	0.36%	947	0.38%	872	0.38%	876	0.4%	868	0.37%	999	0.38%	1,064	0.42%	1,349	0.57%	1,300	0.53%	1,426	0.57%
Venezuela	9,780	0.41%	443	0.19%	560	0.22%	524	0.23%	699	0.32%	1,224	0.52%	1,211	0.46%	1,192	0.47%	1,335	0.56%	1,240	0.5%	1,352	0.54%
Trinidad and Tobago	8,930	0.37%	899	0.4%	903	0.36%	928	0.41%	706	0.32%	731	0.31%	857	0.33%	794	0.32%	975	0.41%	1,002	0.41%	1,135	0.45%
Others	290,481	12.03%	24,962	10.97%	29,700	11.85%	25,935	11.32%	25,330	11.44%	28,941	12.27%	29,894	11.4%	29,769	11.83%	31,860	13.46%	31,588	12.78%	32,502	12.89%
Total	2,414,639	100%	227,470	100%	250,656	100%	229,123	100%	221,396	100%	235,858	100%	262,246	100%	251,649	100%	236,762	100%	247,261	100%	252,218	100%

== 1990s ==
Immigrants by country of origin (1990s)
1. Hong Kong (12.2%)
2. India (7.45%)
3. China (6.98%)
4. Philippines (6.06%)
5. Taiwan (3.66%)
6. Sri Lanka (3.10%)
7. United Kingdom (2.95%)
8. Yugoslavia (2.89%)
9. Poland (2.89%)
10. Other (51.9%)

During the 1990s, 2,204,161 immigrants arrived in Canada. Furthermore, the top ten source countries for immigrants to Canada during the 1990s included Hong Kong (268,162 persons or 12.2 percent), India (164,258 persons or 7.45 percent), China (153,778 persons or 6.98 percent), Philippines (133,585 persons or 6.06 percent), Taiwan (80,566 persons or 3.66 percent), Sri Lanka (68,356 persons or 3.10 percent), United Kingdom (65,026 persons or 2.95 percent), Yugoslavia (63,746 persons or 2.89 percent), Poland (63,735 persons or 2.89 percent), and the United States (61,097 persons or 2.77 percent).

Immigrant arrivals during the 1990s (1990–1999) by top 50 countries of citizenship
Country	Total 1990s		1990		1991		1992		1993		1994		1995		1996		1997		1998		1999	
Country	Pop.	%	Pop.	%	Pop.	%	Pop.	%	Pop.	%	Pop.	%	Pop.	%	Pop.	%	Pop.	%	Pop.	%	Pop.	%
Hong Kong	268,162	12.17%	29,554	13.65%	22,527	9.68%	39,230	15.4%	36,714	14.31%	44,271	19.73%	31,859	14.97%	30,006	13.27%	22,250	10.3%	8,087	4.64%	3,664	1.93%
India	164,258	7.45%	10,734	4.96%	12,953	5.56%	12,777	5.01%	20,525	8%	17,263	7.69%	16,263	7.64%	21,301	9.42%	19,592	9.07%	15,387	8.83%	17,463	9.19%
China	153,778	6.98%	8,076	3.73%	14,255	6.12%	10,846	4.26%	9,817	3.83%	12,513	5.58%	13,308	6.25%	17,533	7.76%	18,526	8.58%	19,785	11.36%	29,119	15.33%
Philippines	133,585	6.06%	12,155	5.62%	12,454	5.35%	13,376	5.25%	19,848	7.73%	19,142	8.53%	15,190	7.14%	13,148	5.82%	10,880	5.04%	8,187	4.7%	9,205	4.85%
Taiwan	80,566	3.66%	3,860	1.78%	4,650	2%	7,662	3.01%	10,076	3.93%	7,423	3.31%	7,689	3.61%	13,225	5.85%	13,324	6.17%	7,193	4.13%	5,464	2.88%
Sri Lanka	68,356	3.1%	3,525	1.63%	7,266	3.12%	13,102	5.14%	9,563	3.73%	6,680	2.98%	8,938	4.2%	6,159	2.72%	5,071	2.35%	3,329	1.91%	4,723	2.49%
United Kingdom	65,026	2.95%	9,092	4.2%	8,351	3.59%	7,793	3.06%	7,695	3%	6,338	2.82%	6,393	3%	5,837	2.58%	4,846	2.24%	4,047	2.32%	4,634	2.44%
Yugoslavia	63,746	2.89%	1,987	0.92%	1,832	0.79%	3,592	1.41%	9,137	3.56%	10,049	4.48%	10,267	4.82%	8,050	3.56%	6,537	3.03%	6,413	3.68%	5,882	3.1%
Poland	63,735	2.89%	16,731	7.73%	15,877	6.82%	11,972	4.7%	6,904	2.69%	3,432	1.53%	2,306	1.08%	2,063	0.91%	1,708	0.79%	1,444	0.83%	1,298	0.68%
United States	61,097	2.77%	6,147	2.84%	6,664	2.86%	7,596	2.98%	8,040	3.13%	6,248	2.78%	5,173	2.43%	5,846	2.59%	5,036	2.33%	4,800	2.76%	5,547	2.92%
Pakistan	58,546	2.66%	2,470	1.14%	3,079	1.32%	4,071	1.6%	4,777	1.86%	3,761	1.68%	4,002	1.88%	7,760	3.43%	11,239	5.2%	8,090	4.64%	9,297	4.89%
Iran	53,072	2.41%	3,655	1.69%	6,250	2.68%	6,814	2.67%	3,959	1.54%	2,701	1.2%	3,692	1.73%	5,833	2.58%	7,486	3.47%	6,775	3.89%	5,907	3.11%
Soviet Union	52,391	2.38%	1,395	0.64%	2,005	0.86%	2,818	1.11%	3,356	1.31%	3,922	1.75%	4,810	2.26%	6,370	2.82%	8,978	4.16%	10,423	5.98%	8,314	4.38%
Vietnam	51,759	2.35%	9,167	4.24%	9,028	3.88%	7,740	3.04%	8,331	3.25%	6,244	2.78%	3,944	1.85%	2,490	1.1%	1,787	0.83%	1,631	0.94%	1,397	0.74%
Lebanon	48,228	2.19%	13,568	6.27%	12,567	5.4%	6,915	2.71%	4,902	1.91%	2,680	1.19%	1,917	0.9%	1,809	0.8%	1,246	0.58%	1,230	0.71%	1,394	0.73%
Jamaica	40,260	1.83%	4,945	2.28%	5,056	2.17%	5,991	2.35%	6,065	2.36%	3,910	1.74%	3,607	1.69%	3,278	1.45%	2,835	1.31%	2,234	1.28%	2,339	1.23%
South Korea	38,010	1.72%	2,087	0.96%	2,598	1.12%	3,790	1.49%	3,819	1.49%	2,959	1.32%	3,466	1.63%	3,157	1.4%	4,001	1.85%	4,917	2.82%	7,216	3.8%
France	34,551	1.57%	2,615	1.21%	3,235	1.39%	3,767	1.48%	3,994	1.56%	3,046	1.36%	3,890	1.83%	3,363	1.49%	2,848	1.32%	3,870	2.22%	3,923	2.07%
Romania	32,265	1.46%	2,252	1.04%	2,337	1%	3,147	1.24%	3,676	1.43%	2,977	1.33%	3,851	1.81%	3,670	1.62%	3,916	1.81%	2,976	1.71%	3,463	1.82%
Stateless	31,596	1.43%	9,618	4.44%	4,118	1.77%	1,839	0.72%	3,581	1.4%	1,427	0.64%	1,853	0.87%	2,544	1.13%	2,845	1.32%	1,916	1.1%	1,855	0.98%
Guyana	26,988	1.22%	2,824	1.3%	3,266	1.4%	2,932	1.15%	3,399	1.32%	4,136	1.84%	3,870	1.82%	2,288	1.01%	1,760	0.81%	1,193	0.68%	1,320	0.69%
Trinidad and Tobago	25,806	1.17%	2,843	1.31%	3,026	1.3%	4,374	1.72%	4,246	1.65%	2,352	1.05%	2,607	1.22%	2,210	0.98%	1,787	0.83%	1,199	0.69%	1,162	0.61%
El Salvador	24,230	1.1%	4,384	2.03%	7,124	3.06%	5,670	2.23%	2,977	1.16%	1,172	0.52%	715	0.34%	711	0.31%	602	0.28%	463	0.27%	412	0.22%
Haiti	21,624	0.98%	2,379	1.1%	2,829	1.22%	2,399	0.94%	3,655	1.42%	2,087	0.93%	2,008	0.94%	1,936	0.86%	1,621	0.75%	1,283	0.74%	1,427	0.75%
Somalia	21,209	0.96%	1,059	0.49%	3,266	1.4%	5,794	2.27%	3,734	1.45%	952	0.42%	1,458	0.68%	1,198	0.53%	946	0.44%	1,304	0.75%	1,498	0.79%
Germany	20,543	0.93%	1,636	0.76%	1,585	0.68%	1,487	0.58%	1,895	0.74%	1,975	0.88%	2,363	1.11%	2,538	1.12%	2,104	0.97%	2,064	1.18%	2,896	1.52%
Egypt	19,812	0.9%	2,365	1.09%	1,860	0.8%	1,558	0.61%	1,598	0.62%	2,493	1.11%	2,756	1.29%	2,418	1.07%	2,031	0.94%	1,320	0.76%	1,413	0.74%
Portugal	19,235	0.87%	5,652	2.61%	5,348	2.3%	2,768	1.09%	1,575	0.61%	802	0.36%	842	0.4%	727	0.32%	711	0.33%	462	0.27%	348	0.18%
Israel	18,657	0.85%	1,596	0.74%	1,358	0.58%	1,259	0.49%	1,584	0.62%	1,616	0.72%	2,251	1.06%	2,546	1.13%	2,108	0.98%	1,917	1.1%	2,422	1.28%
Bangladesh	16,809	0.76%	611	0.28%	1,115	0.48%	1,655	0.65%	1,280	0.5%	1,229	0.55%	1,773	0.83%	2,448	1.08%	2,928	1.36%	1,945	1.12%	1,825	0.96%
South Africa	15,953	0.72%	902	0.42%	823	0.35%	1,059	0.42%	1,549	0.6%	2,918	1.3%	1,752	0.82%	1,557	0.69%	2,062	0.95%	1,634	0.94%	1,697	0.89%
Iraq	15,399	0.7%	557	0.26%	1,013	0.44%	1,498	0.59%	2,103	0.82%	1,933	0.86%	1,746	0.82%	1,839	0.81%	1,919	0.89%	1,395	0.8%	1,396	0.73%
Saudi Arabia	14,269	0.65%	22	0.01%	47	0.02%	71	0.03%	55	0.02%	1,782	0.79%	2,906	1.37%	2,495	1.1%	3,293	1.52%	2,021	1.16%	1,577	0.83%
Afghanistan	14,217	0.65%	1,028	0.47%	1,378	0.59%	1,170	0.46%	713	0.28%	722	0.32%	1,391	0.65%	2,010	0.89%	2,115	0.98%	1,583	0.91%	2,107	1.11%
Ghana	13,334	0.6%	449	0.21%	1,134	0.49%	2,502	0.98%	2,201	0.86%	1,352	0.6%	1,446	0.68%	1,163	0.51%	1,247	0.58%	1,028	0.59%	812	0.43%
Mexico	12,267	0.56%	1,193	0.55%	1,134	0.49%	1,189	0.47%	1,139	0.44%	786	0.35%	763	0.36%	1,231	0.54%	1,720	0.8%	1,392	0.8%	1,720	0.91%
United Arab Emirates	11,769	0.53%	7	0%	23	0.01%	27	0.01%	11	0%	1,359	0.61%	1,662	0.78%	2,289	1.01%	2,812	1.3%	1,826	1.05%	1,753	0.92%
Algeria	11,561	0.52%	491	0.23%	872	0.37%	795	0.31%	717	0.28%	541	0.24%	870	0.41%	1,721	0.76%	1,608	0.74%	1,916	1.1%	2,030	1.07%
Syria	11,340	0.51%	1,791	0.83%	1,596	0.69%	1,172	0.46%	1,247	0.49%	965	0.43%	1,053	0.49%	942	0.42%	859	0.4%	892	0.51%	823	0.43%
Morocco	11,271	0.51%	1,313	0.61%	1,390	0.6%	1,055	0.41%	1,042	0.41%	635	0.28%	1,008	0.47%	836	0.37%	1,040	0.48%	1,187	0.68%	1,765	0.93%
Ethiopia	10,875	0.49%	890	0.41%	1,168	0.5%	1,876	0.74%	1,779	0.69%	1,270	0.57%	924	0.43%	950	0.42%	785	0.36%	598	0.34%	635	0.33%
Jordan	10,481	0.48%	841	0.39%	807	0.35%	909	0.36%	1,141	0.44%	1,173	0.52%	1,006	0.47%	1,070	0.47%	1,317	0.61%	999	0.57%	1,218	0.64%
Peru	10,134	0.46%	1,384	0.64%	1,522	0.65%	1,632	0.64%	1,274	0.5%	978	0.44%	831	0.39%	830	0.37%	666	0.31%	472	0.27%	545	0.29%
Guatemala	9,781	0.44%	1,023	0.47%	2,156	0.93%	1,906	0.75%	1,392	0.54%	764	0.34%	653	0.31%	692	0.31%	531	0.25%	373	0.21%	291	0.15%
Fiji	9,397	0.43%	1,172	0.54%	1,619	0.7%	1,782	0.7%	1,317	0.51%	1,016	0.45%	674	0.32%	621	0.27%	448	0.21%	388	0.22%	360	0.19%
Turkey	8,714	0.4%	767	0.35%	941	0.4%	1,116	0.44%	1,316	0.51%	901	0.4%	747	0.35%	631	0.28%	662	0.31%	802	0.46%	831	0.44%
Malaysia	8,172	0.37%	1,917	0.89%	1,338	0.57%	1,486	0.58%	1,000	0.39%	727	0.32%	490	0.23%	382	0.17%	319	0.15%	214	0.12%	299	0.16%
Japan	8,077	0.37%	379	0.18%	506	0.22%	605	0.24%	907	0.35%	956	0.43%	826	0.39%	994	0.44%	924	0.43%	897	0.51%	1,083	0.57%
Kuwait	7,542	0.34%	26	0.01%	31	0.01%	96	0.04%	109	0.04%	1,030	0.46%	1,411	0.66%	1,449	0.64%	1,476	0.68%	1,177	0.68%	737	0.39%
Netherlands	7,152	0.32%	627	0.29%	570	0.24%	686	0.27%	671	0.26%	593	0.26%	644	0.3%	1,052	0.47%	723	0.33%	675	0.39%	911	0.48%
Others	204,556	9.28%	20,690	9.56%	24,843	10.67%	27,421	10.76%	24,232	9.44%	16,181	7.21%	16,998	7.99%	18,855	8.34%	17,961	8.31%	16,842	9.67%	20,533	10.81%
Total	2,204,161	100%	216,451	100%	232,790	100%	254,787	100%	256,637	100%	224,382	100%	212,862	100%	226,071	100%	216,036	100%	174,195	100%	189,950	100%

== 1980s ==
During the 1980s, 1,259,325 immigrants arrived in Canada. Furthermore, the top ten source countries for immigrants to Canada during the 1980s included United Kingdom (116,765 persons or 9.27 percent), Vietnam (104,950 persons or 8.33 percent), Hong Kong (99,415 persons or 7.89 percent), India (82,156 persons or 6.52 percent), United States (78,483 persons or 6.23 percent), Poland (62,751 persons or 4.98 percent), Philippines (60,764 persons or 4.83 percent), Portugal (40,432 persons or 3.21 percent), Jamaica (34,328 persons or 2.73 percent), and Guyana (32,096 persons or 2.55 percent).

Immigrant arrivals during the 1980s (1980–1989) by top 50 countries of citizenship
Country	Total 1980s		1980		1981		1982		1983		1984		1985		1986		1987		1988		1989	
Country	Pop.	%	Pop.	%	Pop.	%	Pop.	%	Pop.	%	Pop.	%	Pop.	%	Pop.	%	Pop.	%	Pop.	%	Pop.	%
United Kingdom	116,765	9.27%	18,976	13.26%	21,994	17.1%	18,401	15.19%	6,787	7.61%	6,034	6.84%	5,343	6.33%	6,253	6.29%	10,606	6.97%	11,492	7.11%	10,879	5.68%
Vietnam	104,950	8.33%	31,423	21.95%	11,836	9.2%	5,945	4.91%	6,467	7.25%	10,997	12.46%	10,409	12.34%	6,626	6.67%	5,665	3.73%	6,180	3.82%	9,402	4.91%
Hong Kong	99,415	7.89%	3,069	2.14%	2,813	2.19%	6,552	5.41%	6,728	7.54%	7,727	8.75%	7,383	8.75%	5,901	5.94%	16,162	10.63%	23,225	14.37%	19,855	10.37%
India	82,156	6.52%	8,880	6.2%	8,670	6.74%	8,148	6.72%	7,338	8.23%	5,704	6.46%	4,211	4.99%	7,151	7.2%	10,189	6.7%	11,522	7.13%	10,343	5.4%
United States	78,483	6.23%	9,378	6.55%	10,030	7.8%	9,375	7.74%	7,399	8.3%	6,949	7.87%	6,672	7.91%	7,283	7.33%	7,963	5.24%	6,521	4.04%	6,913	3.61%
Poland	62,751	4.98%	863	0.6%	2,930	2.28%	8,291	6.84%	5,106	5.73%	4,518	5.12%	3,618	4.29%	5,236	5.27%	7,034	4.63%	9,208	5.7%	15,947	8.33%
Philippines	60,764	4.83%	6,051	4.23%	5,921	4.6%	5,249	4.33%	4,562	5.12%	3,801	4.31%	3,150	3.73%	4,166	4.19%	7,360	4.84%	8,639	5.35%	11,865	6.19%
Portugal	40,432	3.21%	4,473	3.12%	3,486	2.71%	2,432	2.01%	1,433	1.61%	1,398	1.58%	1,451	1.72%	2,617	2.63%	7,684	5.05%	6,888	4.26%	8,570	4.47%
Stateless	34,625	2.75%	1,191	0.83%	1,829	1.42%	2,215	1.83%	4,229	4.74%	4,694	5.32%	3,745	4.44%	3,666	3.69%	2,924	1.92%	4,493	2.78%	5,639	2.94%
Jamaica	34,328	2.73%	3,198	2.23%	2,634	2.05%	2,661	2.2%	2,455	2.75%	2,508	2.84%	2,938	3.48%	4,649	4.68%	5,415	3.56%	3,924	2.43%	3,946	2.06%
Guyana	32,096	2.55%	2,334	1.63%	2,943	2.29%	3,575	2.95%	2,650	2.97%	1,932	2.19%	2,299	2.73%	3,942	3.97%	6,174	4.06%	2,977	1.84%	3,270	1.71%
China	32,003	2.54%	5,123	3.58%	6,682	5.19%	3,308	2.73%	1,863	2.09%	1,527	1.73%	1,816	2.15%	1,960	1.97%	2,643	1.74%	2,758	1.71%	4,323	2.26%
Lebanon	24,918	1.98%	1,409	0.98%	1,119	0.87%	1,159	0.96%	789	0.88%	1,253	1.42%	1,683	2%	2,576	2.59%	3,803	2.5%	3,970	2.46%	7,157	3.74%
Haiti	22,546	1.79%	1,666	1.16%	3,692	2.87%	3,498	2.89%	2,860	3.21%	1,418	1.61%	1,321	1.57%	1,753	1.76%	2,132	1.4%	1,829	1.13%	2,377	1.24%
El Salvador	21,648	1.72%	110	0.08%	295	0.23%	882	0.73%	2,587	2.9%	2,666	3.02%	2,769	3.28%	3,106	3.13%	3,558	2.34%	2,720	1.68%	2,955	1.54%
Iran	21,477	1.71%	1,172	0.82%	1,429	1.11%	1,822	1.5%	1,592	1.79%	1,977	2.24%	1,648	1.95%	1,794	1.81%	2,989	1.97%	3,273	2.03%	3,781	1.97%
Germany	21,070	1.67%	1,652	1.15%	1,988	1.55%	4,449	3.67%	2,549	2.86%	1,737	1.97%	1,588	1.88%	1,422	1.43%	1,918	1.26%	1,715	1.06%	2,052	1.07%
France	19,955	1.58%	1,729	1.21%	2,027	1.58%	2,397	1.98%	1,656	1.86%	1,386	1.57%	1,401	1.66%	1,612	1.62%	2,290	1.51%	2,582	1.6%	2,875	1.5%
South Korea	16,259	1.29%	1,011	0.71%	1,456	1.13%	1,572	1.3%	1,081	1.21%	847	0.96%	962	1.14%	1,208	1.22%	2,338	1.54%	2,805	1.74%	2,979	1.56%
Sri Lanka	14,796	1.17%	185	0.13%	371	0.29%	290	0.24%	197	0.22%	1,086	1.23%	845	1%	1,838	1.85%	4,447	2.92%	2,779	1.72%	2,758	1.44%
Taiwan	13,267	1.05%	1,002	0.7%	977	0.76%	840	0.69%	817	0.92%	675	0.76%	642	0.76%	815	0.82%	1,585	1.04%	2,392	1.48%	3,522	1.84%
Trinidad and Tobago	12,851	1.02%	958	0.67%	947	0.74%	972	0.8%	766	0.86%	606	0.69%	699	0.83%	955	0.96%	1,676	1.1%	2,218	1.37%	3,054	1.59%
Israel	11,975	0.95%	1,403	0.98%	1,711	1.33%	1,334	1.1%	541	0.61%	446	0.51%	680	0.81%	1,212	1.22%	1,497	0.98%	1,389	0.86%	1,762	0.92%
Italy	11,344	0.9%	1,820	1.27%	2,057	1.6%	1,508	1.24%	828	0.93%	843	0.96%	650	0.77%	716	0.72%	1,030	0.68%	858	0.53%	1,034	0.54%
Pakistan	10,591	0.84%	978	0.68%	972	0.76%	1,201	0.99%	900	1.01%	668	0.76%	514	0.61%	691	0.7%	1,072	0.7%	1,334	0.83%	2,261	1.18%
Netherlands	10,004	0.79%	1,889	1.32%	1,858	1.44%	1,830	1.51%	673	0.75%	547	0.62%	466	0.55%	524	0.53%	575	0.38%	820	0.51%	822	0.43%
Chile	9,475	0.75%	1,233	0.86%	1,069	0.83%	1,078	0.89%	781	0.88%	681	0.77%	533	0.63%	633	0.64%	1,454	0.96%	990	0.61%	1,023	0.53%
Malaysia	9,281	0.74%	786	0.55%	816	0.63%	813	0.67%	448	0.5%	384	0.44%	374	0.44%	425	0.43%	817	0.54%	2,072	1.28%	2,346	1.22%
Yugoslavia	8,765	0.7%	735	0.51%	785	0.61%	805	0.66%	492	0.55%	487	0.55%	492	0.58%	485	0.49%	1,078	0.71%	1,364	0.84%	2,042	1.07%
South Africa	8,679	0.69%	1,026	0.72%	1,118	0.87%	781	0.64%	379	0.42%	271	0.31%	310	0.37%	718	0.72%	1,470	0.97%	1,305	0.81%	1,301	0.68%
Ireland	7,647	0.61%	781	0.55%	895	0.7%	707	0.58%	298	0.33%	327	0.37%	287	0.34%	481	0.48%	1,078	0.71%	1,415	0.88%	1,378	0.72%
Romania	7,613	0.6%	375	0.26%	438	0.34%	583	0.48%	543	0.61%	524	0.59%	604	0.72%	656	0.66%	1,202	0.79%	1,106	0.68%	1,582	0.83%
Egypt	7,556	0.6%	612	0.43%	660	0.51%	755	0.62%	455	0.51%	447	0.51%	348	0.41%	514	0.52%	1,017	0.67%	1,085	0.67%	1,663	0.87%
Laos	7,389	0.59%	5,248	3.67%	1,978	1.54%	16	0.01%	16	0.02%	7	0.01%	17	0.02%	21	0.02%	20	0.01%	22	0.01%	44	0.02%
Cambodia	7,380	0.59%	5,249	3.67%	1,991	1.55%	26	0.02%	33	0.04%	10	0.01%	7	0.01%	8	0.01%	14	0.01%	15	0.01%	27	0.01%
Greece	7,282	0.58%	1,065	0.74%	953	0.74%	885	0.73%	601	0.67%	557	0.63%	551	0.65%	552	0.56%	770	0.51%	579	0.36%	769	0.4%
Peru	6,424	0.51%	317	0.22%	456	0.35%	401	0.33%	241	0.27%	306	0.35%	328	0.39%	628	0.63%	843	0.55%	1,237	0.77%	1,667	0.87%
Mexico	6,131	0.49%	409	0.29%	394	0.31%	491	0.41%	490	0.55%	509	0.58%	425	0.5%	667	0.67%	813	0.53%	916	0.57%	1,017	0.53%
Guatemala	6,074	0.48%	114	0.08%	108	0.08%	113	0.09%	366	0.41%	598	0.68%	975	1.16%	1,265	1.27%	1,060	0.7%	702	0.43%	773	0.4%
Syria	5,799	0.46%	315	0.22%	419	0.33%	409	0.34%	269	0.3%	264	0.3%	385	0.46%	493	0.5%	927	0.61%	864	0.53%	1,454	0.76%
Fiji	5,721	0.45%	632	0.44%	705	0.55%	814	0.67%	554	0.62%	389	0.44%	446	0.53%	361	0.36%	523	0.34%	561	0.35%	736	0.38%
Tanzania	5,630	0.45%	635	0.44%	832	0.65%	621	0.51%	474	0.53%	473	0.54%	460	0.55%	403	0.41%	538	0.35%	532	0.33%	662	0.35%
Czechoslovakia	5,533	0.44%	172	0.12%	388	0.3%	552	0.46%	336	0.38%	415	0.47%	567	0.67%	578	0.58%	770	0.51%	758	0.47%	997	0.52%
Hungary	5,522	0.44%	205	0.14%	310	0.24%	397	0.33%	337	0.38%	310	0.35%	522	0.62%	647	0.65%	676	0.44%	1,139	0.7%	979	0.51%
Switzerland	5,151	0.41%	806	0.56%	811	0.63%	634	0.52%	370	0.41%	326	0.37%	314	0.37%	294	0.3%	565	0.37%	508	0.31%	523	0.27%
Morocco	4,792	0.38%	325	0.23%	471	0.37%	447	0.37%	335	0.38%	248	0.28%	328	0.39%	388	0.39%	505	0.33%	685	0.42%	1,060	0.55%
Australia	4,564	0.36%	702	0.49%	639	0.5%	484	0.4%	317	0.36%	317	0.36%	319	0.38%	356	0.36%	467	0.31%	410	0.25%	553	0.29%
Kenya	4,468	0.35%	291	0.2%	296	0.23%	221	0.18%	201	0.23%	218	0.25%	245	0.29%	244	0.25%	628	0.41%	984	0.61%	1,140	0.6%
Turkey	4,369	0.35%	481	0.34%	874	0.68%	706	0.58%	280	0.31%	338	0.38%	202	0.24%	257	0.26%	397	0.26%	346	0.21%	488	0.25%
Japan	4,297	0.34%	701	0.49%	756	0.59%	598	0.49%	309	0.35%	246	0.28%	198	0.23%	248	0.25%	423	0.28%	324	0.2%	494	0.26%
Others	92,314	7.33%	7,980	5.58%	7,812	6.07%	7,935	6.55%	5,407	6.06%	5,676	6.43%	6,207	7.36%	8,358	8.41%	13,293	8.74%	13,155	8.14%	16,491	8.61%
Total	1,259,325	100%	143,138	100%	128,641	100%	121,178	100%	89,185	100%	88,272	100%	84,347	100%	99,352	100%	152,077	100%	161,585	100%	191,550	100%

== 1970s ==
During the 1970s, 1,445,017 immigrants arrived in Canada. Furthermore, the top ten source countries/regions for immigrants to Canada during the 1970s included United Kingdom (227,440 persons or 15.7 percent), United States (193,476 persons or 13.4 percent), Caribbean (134,925 persons or 9.34 percent), China & Hong Kong (92,769 persons or 6.42 percent), South America (81,261 persons or 5.62 percent), Portugal (79,009 persons or 5.47 percent), India (76,584 persons or 5.30 percent), Philippines (55,355 persons or 3.83 percent), Italy (47,846 persons or 3.31 percent), and Greece (37,797 persons or 2.62 percent).

Immigrant arrivals during the 1970s (1970–1979) by country or region of last permanent residence
Country or Region	Total 1970s		1970		1971		1972		1973		1974		1975		1976		1977		1978		1979	
Country or Region	Pop.	%	Pop.	%	Pop.	%	Pop.	%	Pop.	%	Pop.	%	Pop.	%	Pop.	%	Pop.	%	Pop.	%	Pop.	%
United Kingdom	227,440	15.74%	26,497	17.94%	15,451	12.68%	18,197	14.91%	26,973	14.64%	38,456	17.6%	34,978	18.62%	21,548	14.42%	18,536	16.13%	12,251	14.18%	14,553	12.98%
United States	193,476	13.39%	24,424	16.53%	24,366	19.99%	22,618	18.54%	25,242	13.7%	26,541	12.15%	20,155	10.73%	17,315	11.59%	12,918	11.24%	9,949	11.51%	9,948	8.87%
Caribbean	134,925	9.34%	12,660	8.57%	11,017	9.04%	8,353	6.85%	19,563	10.62%	23,885	10.93%	17,973	9.57%	14,842	9.93%	11,789	10.26%	8,222	9.51%	6,621	5.91%
China & Hong Kong	92,769	6.42%	5,377	3.64%	5,056	4.15%	6,322	5.18%	14,722	7.99%	13,083	5.99%	12,035	6.41%	11,558	7.73%	8,473	7.37%	6,488	7.51%	9,655	8.61%
Other Asia	83,662	5.79%	3,849	2.61%	5,126	4.21%	5,202	4.26%	7,917	4.3%	9,884	4.52%	12,641	6.73%	9,563	6.4%	4,590	3.99%	5,047	5.84%	19,843	17.7%
South America	81,261	5.62%	4,943	3.35%	5,058	4.15%	4,309	3.53%	11,057	6%	12,528	5.73%	13,270	7.06%	10,628	7.11%	7,908	6.88%	6,118	7.08%	5,442	4.85%
Portugal	79,009	5.47%	7,902	5.35%	9,157	7.51%	8,737	7.16%	13,483	7.32%	16,333	7.48%	8,547	4.55%	5,344	3.58%	3,575	3.11%	1,897	2.2%	4,034	3.6%
India	76,584	5.3%	5,670	3.84%	5,313	4.36%	5,049	4.14%	9,203	5%	12,868	5.89%	10,144	5.4%	6,733	4.51%	6,904	6.01%	5,886	6.81%	8,814	7.86%
Other Europe	65,216	4.51%	8,061	5.46%	6,301	5.17%	6,672	5.47%	8,252	4.48%	8,557	3.92%	7,221	3.84%	5,784	3.87%	4,239	3.69%	4,253	4.92%	5,876	5.24%
Philippines	55,355	3.83%	3,240	2.19%	4,180	3.43%	3,946	3.23%	6,757	3.67%	9,564	4.38%	7,364	3.92%	5,939	3.97%	5,021	4.37%	3,845	4.45%	5,499	4.91%
Other Africa	49,374	3.42%	1,304	0.88%	1,382	1.13%	7,262	5.95%	6,636	3.6%	8,368	3.83%	7,408	3.94%	5,413	3.62%	4,734	4.12%	3,640	4.21%	3,227	2.88%
Italy	47,846	3.31%	8,533	5.78%	5,790	4.75%	4,608	3.78%	5,468	2.97%	5,226	2.39%	5,078	2.7%	4,530	3.03%	3,410	2.97%	2,977	3.45%	2,226	1.99%
Greece	37,797	2.62%	6,327	4.28%	4,769	3.91%	4,016	3.29%	5,833	3.17%	5,632	2.58%	4,062	2.16%	2,487	1.66%	1,962	1.71%	1,477	1.71%	1,232	1.1%
France	31,546	2.18%	4,410	2.99%	2,966	2.43%	2,742	2.25%	3,586	1.95%	4,232	1.94%	3,891	2.07%	3,251	2.18%	2,761	2.4%	1,754	2.03%	1,953	1.74%
Yugoslavia	27,057	1.87%	5,672	3.84%	2,997	2.46%	2,047	1.68%	2,873	1.56%	3,200	1.46%	2,932	1.56%	1,741	1.17%	1,839	1.6%	1,854	2.15%	1,902	1.7%
Germany	26,008	1.8%	4,193	2.84%	2,275	1.87%	2,025	1.66%	2,564	1.39%	3,619	1.66%	3,469	1.85%	2,672	1.79%	2,258	1.96%	1,471	1.7%	1,462	1.3%
Australasia	22,982	1.59%	4,385	2.97%	2,902	2.38%	2,143	1.76%	2,671	1.45%	2,594	1.19%	2,174	1.16%	1,886	1.26%	1,547	1.35%	1,237	1.43%	1,443	1.29%
Lebanon	22,521	1.56%	1,206	0.82%	928	0.76%	996	0.82%	1,325	0.72%	1,762	0.81%	1,506	0.8%	7,161	4.79%	4,383	3.81%	1,442	1.67%	1,812	1.62%
Netherlands	15,564	1.08%	1,916	1.3%	1,301	1.07%	1,471	1.21%	1,898	1.03%	2,103	0.96%	1,448	0.77%	1,359	0.91%	1,250	1.09%	1,237	1.43%	1,581	1.41%
Pakistan	14,720	1.02%	1,010	0.68%	968	0.79%	1,190	0.98%	2,285	1.24%	2,315	1.06%	2,165	1.15%	2,173	1.45%	1,069	0.93%	701	0.81%	844	0.75%
Switzerland	11,423	0.79%	2,098	1.42%	1,024	0.84%	778	0.64%	953	0.52%	1,336	0.61%	1,272	0.68%	1,192	0.8%	886	0.77%	891	1.03%	993	0.89%
Central America	10,007	0.69%	711	0.48%	636	0.52%	865	0.71%	1,141	0.62%	1,391	0.64%	1,510	0.8%	1,356	0.91%	974	0.85%	753	0.87%	670	0.6%
South Africa	9,391	0.65%	646	0.44%	729	0.6%	440	0.36%	766	0.42%	1,154	0.53%	1,567	0.83%	1,611	1.08%	985	0.86%	784	0.91%	709	0.63%
Israel	8,908	0.62%	818	0.55%	600	0.49%	620	0.51%	984	0.53%	1,090	0.5%	1,527	0.81%	1,201	0.8%	941	0.82%	721	0.83%	406	0.36%
Egypt	7,498	0.52%	913	0.62%	730	0.6%	606	0.5%	905	0.49%	928	0.42%	892	0.47%	728	0.49%	730	0.64%	564	0.65%	502	0.45%
Others	12,678	0.88%	948	0.64%	878	0.72%	792	0.65%	1,143	0.62%	1,816	0.83%	2,652	1.41%	1,414	0.95%	1,232	1.07%	954	1.1%	849	0.76%
Total	1,445,017	100%	147,713	100%	121,900	100%	122,006	100%	184,200	100%	218,465	100%	187,881	100%	149,429	100%	114,914	100%	86,413	100%	112,096	100%

== 1960s ==
Immigrant arrivals by country or region of last permanent residence (1960s)
1. United Kingdom (24.6%)
2. Italy (14.7%)
3. United States (11.2%)
4. Other Europe (8.18%)
5. Germany (5.86%)
6. Greece (4.36%)
7. Portugal (4.25%)
8. France (3.88%)
9. Caribbean (3.37%)
10. Other (19.6%)

During the 1960s, 1,366,840 immigrants arrived in Canada. The continental breakdown for immigrants to Canada during this time included Europe (966,450 persons or 70.7 percent), North America (202,343 persons or 14.8 percent), Asia (109,770 persons or 8.03 percent), Oceania (30,630 persons or 2.24 percent), Africa (29,178 persons or 2.13 percent), South America (25,888 persons or 1.89 percent), and Other/Not stated (2,581 persons or 0.19 percent). Furthermore, during the 1960s, the top three source countries for immigrants to Canada included the United Kingdom (336,374 persons or 24.6 percent), Italy (200,442 persons or 14.7 percent), and the United States (153,609 persons or 11.2 percent).

Immigrant arrivals during the 1960s (1960–1969) by country or region of last permanent residence
Country or Region	Total 1960s		1960		1961		1962		1963		1964		1965		1966		1967		1968		1969	
Country or Region	Pop.	%	Pop.	%	Pop.	%	Pop.	%	Pop.	%	Pop.	%	Pop.	%	Pop.	%	Pop.	%	Pop.	%	Pop.	%
United Kingdom	336,374	24.61%	19,585	18.81%	11,870	16.56%	15,603	20.92%	24,603	26.41%	29,279	26%	39,857	27.16%	63,291	32.5%	62,420	28.01%	37,889	20.37%	31,977	19.8%
Italy	200,442	14.66%	20,681	19.86%	14,161	19.75%	13,641	18.29%	14,427	15.49%	19,297	17.14%	26,398	17.99%	31,625	16.24%	30,055	13.49%	19,774	10.63%	10,383	6.43%
United States	153,609	11.24%	11,247	10.8%	11,516	16.06%	11,643	15.61%	11,736	12.6%	12,565	11.16%	15,143	10.32%	17,514	8.99%	19,038	8.54%	20,422	10.98%	22,785	14.11%
Other Europe	111,781	8.18%	11,701	11.24%	7,568	10.56%	6,436	8.63%	7,459	8.01%	9,326	8.28%	10,484	7.14%	13,022	6.69%	15,225	6.83%	18,959	10.19%	11,601	7.18%
Germany	80,104	5.86%	10,774	10.35%	6,231	8.69%	5,548	7.44%	6,744	7.24%	5,992	5.32%	8,927	6.08%	9,263	4.76%	11,779	5.29%	8,966	4.82%	5,880	3.64%
Greece	59,655	4.36%	4,856	4.66%	3,766	5.25%	3,741	5.02%	4,759	5.11%	4,391	3.9%	5,642	3.84%	7,174	3.68%	10,650	4.78%	7,739	4.16%	6,937	4.29%
Portugal	58,106	4.25%	5,023	4.82%	2,762	3.85%	2,928	3.93%	4,000	4.29%	5,309	4.71%	5,734	3.91%	7,930	4.07%	9,500	4.26%	7,738	4.16%	7,182	4.45%
France	53,011	3.88%	2,944	2.83%	2,330	3.25%	2,674	3.59%	3,569	3.83%	4,542	4.03%	5,225	3.56%	7,872	4.04%	10,122	4.54%	8,184	4.4%	5,549	3.44%
Caribbean	46,030	3.37%	1,340	1.29%	1,307	1.82%	1,659	2.22%	2,443	2.62%	2,281	2.03%	3,215	2.19%	4,133	2.12%	8,582	3.85%	7,755	4.17%	13,315	8.24%
China & Hong Kong	38,197	2.79%	1,329	1.28%	828	1.15%	670	0.9%	1,187	1.27%	2,674	2.37%	4,352	2.97%	4,094	2.1%	6,409	2.88%	8,382	4.51%	8,272	5.12%
Australasia	30,630	2.24%	1,657	1.59%	1,432	2%	1,384	1.86%	1,692	1.82%	2,303	2.05%	2,711	1.85%	4,057	2.08%	6,168	2.77%	4,815	2.59%	4,411	2.73%
Netherlands	29,055	2.13%	5,429	5.21%	1,787	2.49%	1,555	2.08%	1,728	1.86%	2,029	1.8%	2,619	1.78%	3,749	1.93%	4,401	1.97%	3,264	1.76%	2,494	1.54%
South America	25,888	1.89%	1,823	1.75%	1,301	1.81%	1,103	1.48%	1,779	1.91%	2,257	2%	2,471	1.68%	2,604	1.34%	3,090	1.39%	4,693	2.52%	4,767	2.95%
India	20,557	1.5%	505	0.49%	568	0.79%	529	0.71%	737	0.79%	1,154	1.02%	2,241	1.53%	2,233	1.15%	3,966	1.78%	3,229	1.74%	5,395	3.34%
Switzerland	19,825	1.45%	1,048	1.01%	805	1.12%	802	1.08%	999	1.07%	1,446	1.28%	2,169	1.48%	2,982	1.53%	3,738	1.68%	3,529	1.9%	2,307	1.43%
Yugoslavia	18,097	1.32%	881	0.85%	852	1.19%	862	1.16%	781	0.84%	1,187	1.05%	1,230	0.84%	1,502	0.77%	2,089	0.94%	4,660	2.51%	4,053	2.51%
Other Asia	15,857	1.16%	270	0.26%	293	0.41%	478	0.64%	364	0.39%	793	0.7%	1,273	0.87%	1,926	0.99%	3,282	1.47%	3,591	1.93%	3,587	2.22%
Egypt	13,046	0.95%	58	0.06%	31	0.04%	1,322	1.77%	1,476	1.58%	1,855	1.65%	1,378	0.94%	1,854	0.95%	1,728	0.78%	1,915	1.03%	1,429	0.88%
Philippines	12,814	0.94%	—N/a	—N/a	—N/a	—N/a	—N/a	—N/a	—N/a	—N/a	—N/a	—N/a	1,502	1.02%	2,639	1.36%	2,994	1.34%	2,678	1.44%	3,001	1.86%
Israel	11,316	0.83%	1,532	1.47%	652	0.91%	558	0.75%	688	0.74%	871	0.77%	822	0.56%	1,488	0.76%	2,345	1.05%	1,497	0.8%	863	0.53%
Other Africa	9,719	0.71%	272	0.26%	526	0.73%	509	0.68%	659	0.71%	1,602	1.42%	1,273	0.87%	915	0.47%	1,514	0.68%	2,365	1.27%	1,269	0.79%
Lebanon	7,147	0.52%	283	0.27%	293	0.41%	303	0.41%	456	0.49%	347	0.31%	602	0.41%	889	0.46%	1,096	0.49%	1,682	0.9%	1,196	0.74%
South Africa	6,413	0.47%	503	0.48%	531	0.74%	340	0.46%	296	0.32%	417	0.37%	545	0.37%	892	0.46%	1,366	0.61%	924	0.5%	599	0.37%
Pakistan	3,882	0.28%	83	0.08%	72	0.1%	55	0.07%	121	0.13%	282	0.25%	423	0.29%	566	0.29%	648	0.29%	627	0.34%	1,005	0.62%
Central America	2,704	0.2%	202	0.19%	147	0.21%	183	0.25%	168	0.18%	186	0.17%	205	0.14%	224	0.12%	422	0.19%	374	0.2%	593	0.37%
Others	2,581	0.19%	85	0.08%	60	0.08%	60	0.08%	280	0.3%	221	0.2%	317	0.22%	305	0.16%	249	0.11%	323	0.17%	681	0.42%
Total	1,366,840	100%	104,111	100%	71,689	100%	74,586	100%	93,151	100%	112,606	100%	146,758	100%	194,743	100%	222,876	100%	185,974	100%	161,531	100%

== 1950s ==
Immigrant arrivals by country or region of birth (1950s)
1. United Kingdom (24.7%)
2. Italy (15.2%)
3. Germany and Austria (13.8%)
4. Netherlands (7.82%)
5. Poland and Soviet Union (6.02%)
6. United States (5.04%)
7. Hungary (3.46%)
8. France and Belgium (3.41%)
9. Other Europe (2.92%)
10. Other (17.7%)

During the 1950s, 1,544,642 immigrants arrived in Canada. Furthermore, the top five source countries for immigrants to Canada during the 1950s included the United Kingdom (380,984 persons or 24.7 percent), Italy (234,369 persons or 15.2 percent), Germany & Austria (213,653 persons or 13.8 percent) Netherlands (120,757 persons or 7.82 percent), and Poland & the Soviet Union (92,986 persons or 6.02 percent).

Immigrant arrivals during the 1950s (1950–1959) by country or region of birth
Country or Region	Total 1950s		1950		1951		1952		1953		1954		1955		1956		1957		1958		1959	
Country or Region	Pop.	%	Pop.	%	Pop.	%	Pop.	%	Pop.	%	Pop.	%	Pop.	%	Pop.	%	Pop.	%	Pop.	%	Pop.	%
United Kingdom	380,984	24.66%	12,456	16.85%	29,958	15.41%	40,844	24.83%	42,618	25.24%	39,858	25.84%	26,773	24.35%	45,964	27.88%	102,201	36.22%	23,319	18.68%	16,993	15.89%
Italy	234,369	15.17%	9,004	12.18%	23,806	12.25%	20,930	12.72%	24,059	14.25%	24,331	15.78%	19,960	18.15%	29,189	17.71%	28,694	10.17%	28,062	22.48%	26,334	24.63%
Germany & Austria	213,653	13.83%	4,672	6.32%	28,348	14.58%	23,535	14.31%	30,956	18.33%	28,558	18.52%	17,284	15.72%	26,342	15.98%	29,106	10.32%	14,173	11.35%	10,679	9.99%
Netherlands	120,757	7.82%	7,125	9.64%	18,781	9.66%	20,850	12.67%	19,933	11.8%	15,823	10.26%	6,655	6.05%	7,627	4.63%	11,689	4.14%	7,182	5.75%	5,092	4.76%
Poland & Soviet Union	92,986	6.02%	14,540	19.67%	26,594	13.68%	14,051	8.54%	8,678	5.14%	5,973	3.87%	3,974	3.61%	4,116	2.5%	4,910	1.74%	4,645	3.72%	5,505	5.15%
United States	77,899	5.04%	5,909	7.99%	5,982	3.08%	7,603	4.62%	7,388	4.38%	8,089	5.24%	8,487	7.72%	8,016	4.86%	9,092	3.22%	8,460	6.78%	8,873	8.3%
Hungary	53,383	3.46%	1,947	2.63%	5,099	2.62%	1,999	1.22%	1,737	1.03%	1,094	0.71%	680	0.62%	4,583	2.78%	31,897	11.3%	2,985	2.39%	1,362	1.27%
France & Belgium	52,663	3.41%	1,944	2.63%	11,433	5.88%	6,446	3.92%	4,981	2.95%	4,587	2.97%	3,551	3.23%	5,447	3.3%	7,971	2.82%	3,574	2.86%	2,729	2.55%
Other Europe	45,175	2.92%	3,932	5.32%	16,417	8.45%	2,106	1.28%	2,191	1.3%	1,249	0.81%	1,961	1.78%	2,611	1.58%	6,665	2.36%	2,992	2.4%	5,051	4.72%
Scandinavia	39,735	2.57%	237	0.32%	925	0.48%	5,499	3.34%	3,660	2.17%	3,133	2.03%	2,742	2.49%	5,530	3.35%	11,873	4.21%	3,505	2.81%	2,631	2.46%
Yugoslavia	34,974	2.26%	1,558	2.11%	5,651	2.91%	3,106	1.89%	3,543	2.1%	2,416	1.57%	1,916	1.74%	2,803	1.7%	6,262	2.22%	5,095	4.08%	2,624	2.45%
Greece	33,508	2.17%	828	1.12%	2,758	1.42%	1,542	0.94%	1,947	1.15%	2,780	1.8%	2,927	2.66%	5,078	3.08%	5,464	1.94%	5,286	4.23%	4,898	4.58%
Ireland	24,027	1.56%	614	0.83%	938	0.48%	1,516	0.92%	2,805	1.66%	2,795	1.81%	1,584	1.44%	3,221	1.95%	7,626	2.7%	1,685	1.35%	1,243	1.16%
China	22,855	1.48%	1,873	2.53%	2,967	1.53%	2,510	1.53%	2,045	1.21%	2,029	1.32%	2,623	2.39%	2,174	1.32%	1,740	0.62%	2,527	2.02%	2,367	2.21%
Australia & New Zealand	15,029	0.97%	511	0.69%	661	0.34%	894	0.54%	1,313	0.78%	1,619	1.05%	1,612	1.47%	1,998	1.21%	3,190	1.13%	1,918	1.54%	1,313	1.23%
Czechoslovakia	14,180	0.92%	1,848	2.5%	4,401	2.26%	1,893	1.15%	1,594	0.94%	1,159	0.75%	663	0.6%	892	0.54%	933	0.33%	440	0.35%	357	0.33%
Romania	12,670	0.82%	1,212	1.64%	2,930	1.51%	2,057	1.25%	2,084	1.23%	1,174	0.76%	557	0.51%	714	0.43%	957	0.34%	444	0.36%	541	0.51%
Other Commonwealth	11,394	0.74%	938	1.27%	1,754	0.9%	938	0.57%	965	0.57%	1,218	0.79%	840	0.76%	1,070	0.65%	1,481	0.52%	1,072	0.86%	1,118	1.05%
Switzerland	10,648	0.69%	482	0.65%	1,337	0.69%	1,518	0.92%	1,024	0.61%	1,145	0.74%	739	0.67%	1,243	0.75%	1,510	0.54%	923	0.74%	727	0.68%
British West Indies	8,792	0.57%	326	0.44%	584	0.3%	673	0.41%	845	0.5%	799	0.52%	804	0.73%	1,065	0.65%	1,217	0.43%	1,221	0.98%	1,258	1.18%
Other North America	7,292	0.47%	878	1.19%	719	0.37%	795	0.48%	686	0.41%	704	0.46%	669	0.61%	660	0.4%	650	0.23%	736	0.59%	795	0.74%
Other Asia	6,863	0.44%	214	0.29%	714	0.37%	539	0.33%	545	0.32%	496	0.32%	731	0.66%	1,099	0.67%	924	0.33%	757	0.61%	844	0.79%
Other Africa	5,847	0.38%	104	0.14%	234	0.12%	287	0.17%	304	0.18%	186	0.12%	83	0.08%	488	0.3%	2,540	0.9%	997	0.8%	624	0.58%
India	5,655	0.37%	199	0.27%	369	0.19%	468	0.28%	533	0.32%	526	0.34%	538	0.49%	729	0.44%	894	0.32%	629	0.5%	770	0.72%
South America	5,330	0.35%	254	0.34%	350	0.18%	501	0.3%	633	0.37%	598	0.39%	506	0.46%	492	0.3%	763	0.27%	689	0.55%	544	0.51%
British Africa	4,873	0.32%	93	0.13%	196	0.1%	330	0.2%	702	0.42%	637	0.41%	443	0.4%	589	0.36%	811	0.29%	577	0.46%	495	0.46%
Japan	2,276	0.15%	18	0.02%	19	0.01%	539	0.33%	345	0.2%	97	0.06%	99	0.09%	162	0.1%	245	0.09%	234	0.19%	518	0.48%
Central America	2,036	0.13%	92	0.12%	156	0.08%	261	0.16%	247	0.15%	209	0.14%	184	0.17%	165	0.1%	246	0.09%	232	0.19%	244	0.23%
Israel	1,031	0.07%	—N/a	—N/a	—N/a	—N/a	34	0.02%	69	0.04%	86	0.06%	110	0.1%	142	0.09%	204	0.07%	193	0.15%	193	0.18%
Others	3,758	0.24%	104	0.14%	310	0.16%	234	0.14%	438	0.26%	859	0.56%	251	0.23%	648	0.39%	409	0.14%	299	0.24%	206	0.19%
Total	1,544,642	100%	73,912	100%	194,391	100%	164,498	100%	168,868	100%	154,227	100%	109,946	100%	164,857	100%	282,164	100%	124,851	100%	106,928	100%

== 1940s ==
Immigrant arrivals by country of origin (1940s)
1. United Kingdom (37.8%)
2. Poland and Soviet Union (17.9%)
3. United States (12.3%)
4. Newfoundland (4.89%)
5. Netherlands (4.37%)
6. Italy (2.64%)
7. Germany and Austria (2.61%)
8. Ireland and Northern Ireland (2.51%)
9. Other Europe (2.10%)
10. Other (12.9%)

During the 1940s, 428,733 immigrants arrived in Canada. Furthermore, the top five source countries for immigrants to Canada during the 1940s included the United Kingdom (162,082 persons or 37.8 percent), Poland & the Soviet Union (76,777 persons or 17.9 percent), United States (52,604 persons or 12.3 percent), Netherlands (18,729 persons or 4.37 percent), and Italy (11,300 persons or 2.64 percent).

Immigrant arrivals during the 1940s (1940–1949) by country or region of birth
Country or Region	Total 1940s		1940		1941		1942		1943		1944		1945		1946		1947		1948		1949	
Country or Region	Pop.	%	Pop.	%	Pop.	%	Pop.	%	Pop.	%	Pop.	%	Pop.	%	Pop.	%	Pop.	%	Pop.	%	Pop.	%
United Kingdom	162,082	37.8%	2,482	21.92%	—N/a	—N/a	1,290	17.03%	1,582	18.6%	4,837	37.79%	10,845	47.73%	48,996	68.32%	33,322	51.96%	39,597	31.57%	19,131	20.09%
Poland & Soviet Union	76,777	17.91%	209	1.85%	—N/a	—N/a	65	0.86%	45	0.53%	73	0.57%	314	1.38%	755	1.05%	7,725	12.05%	40,364	32.18%	27,227	28.59%
United States	52,604	12.27%	5,105	45.08%	5,311	56.93%	3,688	48.68%	3,135	36.87%	3,343	26.12%	4,741	20.87%	8,958	12.49%	7,075	11.03%	5,576	4.45%	5,672	5.96%
Newfoundland	20,950	4.89%	1,078	9.52%	—N/a	—N/a	1,397	18.44%	2,625	30.87%	3,140	24.53%	4,207	18.52%	2,580	3.6%	2,949	4.6%	2,974	2.37%	—N/a	—N/a
Netherlands	18,729	4.37%	60	0.53%	—N/a	—N/a	15	0.2%	7	0.08%	5	0.04%	19	0.08%	2,191	3.05%	2,718	4.24%	6,940	5.53%	6,774	7.11%
Italy	11,300	2.64%	110	0.97%	—N/a	—N/a	10	0.13%	12	0.14%	11	0.09%	22	0.1%	98	0.14%	131	0.2%	3,204	2.55%	7,702	8.09%
Germany & Austria	11,170	2.61%	202	1.78%	—N/a	—N/a	54	0.71%	44	0.52%	54	0.42%	259	1.14%	1,060	1.48%	595	0.93%	3,811	3.04%	5,091	5.35%
Ireland & Northern Ireland	10,742	2.51%	170	1.5%	—N/a	—N/a	98	1.29%	129	1.52%	215	1.68%	333	1.47%	1,744	2.43%	2,232	3.48%	3,442	2.74%	2,379	2.5%
Other Europe	9,020	2.1%	123	1.09%	—N/a	—N/a	30	0.4%	37	0.44%	49	0.38%	65	0.29%	221	0.31%	702	1.09%	3,183	2.54%	4,610	4.84%
Other North America	7,545	1.76%	540	4.77%	—N/a	—N/a	460	6.07%	459	5.4%	559	4.37%	855	3.76%	1,400	1.95%	1,251	1.95%	1,006	0.8%	1,015	1.07%
France & Belgium	6,924	1.61%	160	1.41%	—N/a	—N/a	43	0.57%	29	0.34%	38	0.3%	96	0.42%	1,127	1.57%	1,330	2.07%	2,242	1.79%	1,859	1.95%
Yugoslavia	5,965	1.39%	57	0.5%	—N/a	—N/a	5	0.07%	10	0.12%	12	0.09%	16	0.07%	39	0.05%	180	0.28%	3,483	2.78%	2,163	2.27%
Czechoslovakia	5,766	1.34%	124	1.1%	—N/a	—N/a	20	0.26%	23	0.27%	21	0.16%	45	0.2%	221	0.31%	383	0.6%	1,998	1.59%	2,931	3.08%
Hungary	4,166	0.97%	109	0.96%	—N/a	—N/a	7	0.09%	18	0.21%	16	0.12%	30	0.13%	123	0.17%	167	0.26%	1,509	1.2%	2,187	2.3%
Romania	3,201	0.75%	24	0.21%	—N/a	—N/a	5	0.07%	16	0.19%	12	0.09%	15	0.07%	41	0.06%	135	0.21%	1,516	1.21%	1,437	1.51%
Other Commonwealth	2,557	0.6%	46	0.41%	—N/a	—N/a	34	0.45%	25	0.29%	43	0.34%	85	0.37%	151	0.21%	165	0.26%	1,182	0.94%	826	0.87%
Australia & New Zealand	2,410	0.56%	116	1.02%	—N/a	—N/a	40	0.53%	33	0.39%	34	0.27%	63	0.28%	349	0.49%	539	0.84%	685	0.55%	551	0.58%
Greece	2,202	0.51%	49	0.43%	—N/a	—N/a	7	0.09%	6	0.07%	6	0.05%	19	0.08%	53	0.07%	652	1.02%	701	0.56%	709	0.74%
India	2,003	0.47%	66	0.58%	—N/a	—N/a	27	0.36%	27	0.32%	44	0.34%	91	0.4%	353	0.49%	598	0.93%	547	0.44%	250	0.26%
British West Indies	1,689	0.39%	96	0.85%	—N/a	—N/a	58	0.77%	86	1.01%	124	0.97%	187	0.82%	391	0.55%	323	0.5%	70	0.06%	354	0.37%
China	1,617	0.38%	69	0.61%	—N/a	—N/a	40	0.53%	19	0.22%	34	0.27%	79	0.35%	118	0.16%	137	0.21%	207	0.17%	914	0.96%
Switzerland	1,196	0.28%	33	0.29%	—N/a	—N/a	44	0.58%	31	0.36%	38	0.3%	76	0.33%	133	0.19%	151	0.24%	334	0.27%	356	0.37%
Norway	1,178	0.27%	35	0.31%	—N/a	—N/a	36	0.48%	9	0.11%	6	0.05%	58	0.26%	174	0.24%	177	0.28%	328	0.26%	355	0.37%
Africa	968	0.23%	46	0.41%	—N/a	—N/a	22	0.29%	23	0.27%	34	0.27%	67	0.29%	182	0.25%	160	0.25%	204	0.16%	230	0.24%
South America	795	0.19%	50	0.44%	—N/a	—N/a	47	0.62%	41	0.48%	30	0.23%	51	0.22%	111	0.15%	110	0.17%	148	0.12%	207	0.22%
Other Asia	626	0.15%	32	0.28%	—N/a	—N/a	11	0.15%	21	0.25%	11	0.09%	41	0.18%	85	0.12%	146	0.23%	104	0.08%	175	0.18%
Central America	252	0.06%	26	0.23%	—N/a	—N/a	10	0.13%	10	0.12%	12	0.09%	35	0.15%	51	0.07%	40	0.06%	33	0.03%	35	0.04%
Japan	202	0.05%	92	0.81%	—N/a	—N/a	13	0.17%	2	0.02%	0	0%	8	0.04%	14	0.02%	34	0.05%	16	0.01%	23	0.02%
Others	4,097	0.96%	15	0.13%	4,018	43.07%	0	0%	0	0%	0	0%	0	0%	0	0%	0	0%	10	0.01%	54	0.06%
Total	428,733	100%	11,324	100%	9,329	100%	7,576	100%	8,504	100%	12,801	100%	22,722	100%	71,719	100%	64,127	100%	125,414	100%	95,217	100%

== 1930s ==
Immigrant arrivals by country of origin (1930s)
1. United States (28.2%)
2. United Kingdom (22.0%)
3. Poland and Soviet Union (15.5%)
4. Czechoslovakia (4.92%)
5. Ireland (3.37%)
6. Germany and Austria (3.33%)
7. Scandinavia (3.22%)
8. Other North America (3.11%)
9. Hungary (2.37%)
10. Other (13.9%)

During the 1930s, 256,255 immigrants arrived in Canada. Furthermore, the top ten source countries/regions for immigrants to Canada during the 1930s included United States (72,365 persons or 28.2 percent), United Kingdom (56,352 persons or 22.0 percent), Poland & Soviet Union (39,762 persons or 15.5 percent), Czechoslovakia (12,613 persons or 4.92 percent), Ireland (8,636 persons or 3.37 percent), Germany & Austria (8,542 persons or 3.33 percent), Scandinavia (8,258 persons or 3.22 percent), Hungary (6,084 persons or 2.37 percent), Yugoslavia & Albania (5,936 persons or 2.32 percent), and Romania & Bulgaria (5,794 persons or 2.26 percent).

Immigrant arrivals during the 1930s (1930–1939) by country or region of birth
Country or Region	Total 1930s		1930		1931		1932		1933		1934		1935		1936		1937		1938		1939	
Country or Region	Pop.	%	Pop.	%	Pop.	%	Pop.	%	Pop.	%	Pop.	%	Pop.	%	Pop.	%	Pop.	%	Pop.	%	Pop.	%
United States	72,365	28.24%	19,627	18.73%	11,582	42.07%	10,140	49.24%	6,180	42.97%	4,519	36.22%	3,859	34.22%	3,591	30.84%	4,180	27.68%	4,474	25.95%	4,213	19.87%
United Kingdom	56,352	21.99%	27,948	26.67%	7,660	27.82%	4,108	19.95%	2,595	18.04%	2,026	16.24%	1,917	17%	1,930	16.58%	2,324	15.39%	2,728	15.82%	3,116	14.69%
Poland & Soviet Union	39,762	15.52%	19,199	18.32%	1,502	5.46%	1,293	6.28%	1,244	8.65%	1,495	11.98%	1,429	12.67%	1,680	14.43%	2,189	14.5%	2,740	15.89%	6,991	32.97%
Czechoslovakia	12,613	4.92%	3,450	3.29%	539	1.96%	448	2.18%	591	4.11%	855	6.85%	646	5.73%	760	6.53%	1,456	9.64%	2,040	11.83%	1,828	8.62%
Ireland	8,636	3.37%	4,974	4.75%	1,010	3.67%	462	2.24%	325	2.26%	338	2.71%	267	2.37%	257	2.21%	319	2.11%	353	2.05%	331	1.56%
Germany & Austria	8,542	3.33%	5,320	5.08%	546	1.98%	423	2.05%	266	1.85%	201	1.61%	169	1.5%	161	1.38%	264	1.75%	289	1.68%	903	4.26%
Scandinavia (Note: Including Denmark, Finland, Iceland, Norway, and Sweden.)	8,258	3.22%	6,263	5.98%	402	1.46%	275	1.34%	204	1.42%	170	1.36%	175	1.55%	148	1.27%	226	1.5%	180	1.04%	215	1.01%
Other North America	7,976	3.11%	1,489	1.42%	1,109	4.03%	1,140	5.54%	780	5.42%	589	4.72%	549	4.87%	565	4.85%	553	3.66%	661	3.83%	541	2.55%
Hungary	6,084	2.37%	2,770	2.64%	456	1.66%	282	1.37%	429	2.98%	387	3.1%	260	2.31%	262	2.25%	412	2.73%	426	2.47%	400	1.89%
Yugoslavia & Albania	5,936	2.32%	2,415	2.3%	311	1.13%	244	1.18%	252	1.75%	301	2.41%	314	2.78%	450	3.86%	636	4.21%	724	4.2%	289	1.36%
Romania & Bulgaria	5,794	2.26%	3,652	3.48%	257	0.93%	171	0.83%	198	1.38%	191	1.53%	223	1.98%	189	1.62%	334	2.21%	380	2.2%	199	0.94%
Newfoundland	4,592	1.79%	1,016	0.97%	416	1.51%	310	1.51%	287	2%	308	2.47%	325	2.88%	393	3.38%	566	3.75%	553	3.21%	418	1.97%
(Kingdom of Italy) & Malta	4,381	1.71%	1,173	1.12%	522	1.9%	334	1.62%	290	2.02%	338	2.71%	349	3.09%	314	2.7%	435	2.88%	393	2.28%	233	1.1%
France & Belgium	2,736	1.07%	869	0.83%	183	0.66%	169	0.82%	114	0.79%	135	1.08%	175	1.55%	201	1.73%	224	1.48%	333	1.93%	333	1.57%
Baltic states	1,823	0.71%	1,090	1.04%	108	0.39%	109	0.53%	63	0.44%	62	0.5%	44	0.39%	81	0.7%	71	0.47%	81	0.47%	114	0.54%
Greece	1,394	0.54%	688	0.66%	58	0.21%	60	0.29%	40	0.28%	47	0.38%	59	0.52%	83	0.71%	106	0.7%	126	0.73%	127	0.6%
Netherlands	1,340	0.52%	622	0.59%	41	0.15%	41	0.2%	32	0.22%	36	0.29%	32	0.28%	73	0.63%	66	0.44%	129	0.75%	268	1.26%
Japan & Korea	1,297	0.51%	235	0.22%	183	0.66%	127	0.62%	115	0.8%	135	1.08%	79	0.7%	106	0.91%	163	1.08%	73	0.42%	81	0.38%
Switzerland	1,088	0.42%	405	0.39%	55	0.2%	32	0.16%	41	0.29%	28	0.22%	48	0.43%	67	0.58%	200	1.32%	106	0.61%	106	0.5%
Australia & New Zealand	1,001	0.39%	425	0.41%	129	0.47%	76	0.37%	56	0.39%	53	0.42%	44	0.39%	36	0.31%	46	0.3%	49	0.28%	87	0.41%
India	926	0.36%	272	0.26%	134	0.49%	107	0.52%	81	0.56%	63	0.5%	61	0.54%	42	0.36%	40	0.26%	55	0.32%	71	0.33%
Caribbean	664	0.26%	222	0.21%	79	0.29%	55	0.27%	44	0.31%	50	0.4%	39	0.35%	33	0.28%	42	0.28%	39	0.23%	61	0.29%
Africa	464	0.18%	149	0.14%	63	0.23%	42	0.2%	33	0.23%	24	0.19%	35	0.31%	24	0.21%	33	0.22%	23	0.13%	38	0.18%
Mexico	456	0.18%	27	0.03%	7	0.03%	14	0.07%	11	0.08%	7	0.06%	53	0.47%	76	0.65%	66	0.44%	125	0.72%	70	0.33%
(Syrian Federation) Syria–Lebanon & Turkey	401	0.16%	132	0.13%	35	0.13%	34	0.17%	34	0.24%	25	0.2%	25	0.22%	39	0.33%	25	0.17%	31	0.18%	21	0.1%
China	337	0.13%	54	0.05%	30	0.11%	29	0.14%	23	0.16%	26	0.21%	29	0.26%	29	0.25%	37	0.25%	36	0.21%	44	0.21%
Other South America	224	0.09%	61	0.06%	20	0.07%	26	0.13%	13	0.09%	12	0.1%	18	0.16%	12	0.1%	19	0.13%	20	0.12%	23	0.11%
Argentina & Brazil & Chile	183	0.07%	49	0.05%	30	0.11%	11	0.05%	18	0.13%	9	0.07%	18	0.16%	6	0.05%	9	0.06%	16	0.09%	17	0.08%
Other Asia	145	0.06%	33	0.03%	10	0.04%	3	0.01%	6	0.04%	6	0.05%	21	0.19%	9	0.08%	13	0.09%	20	0.12%	24	0.11%
Other Commonwealth	136	0.05%	45	0.04%	16	0.06%	9	0.04%	5	0.03%	15	0.12%	3	0.03%	6	0.05%	11	0.07%	12	0.07%	14	0.07%
Spain & Portugal	68	0.03%	14	0.01%	10	0.04%	3	0.01%	3	0.02%	9	0.07%	1	0.01%	8	0.07%	7	0.05%	6	0.03%	7	0.03%
Other Europe	68	0.03%	57	0.05%	2	0.01%	0	0%	0	0%	2	0.02%	2	0.02%	0	0%	0	0%	3	0.02%	2	0.01%
Other Central America	51	0.02%	16	0.02%	9	0.03%	3	0.01%	2	0.01%	0	0%	2	0.02%	4	0.03%	8	0.05%	7	0.04%	0	0%
East Indies	17	0.01%	4	0%	0	0%	0	0%	0	0%	0	0%	0	0%	0	0%	4	0.03%	4	0.02%	5	0.02%
Armenia	12	0%	6	0.01%	1	0%	1	0%	0	0%	0	0%	0	0%	0	0%	1	0.01%	1	0.01%	2	0.01%
Persia	12	0%	2	0%	2	0.01%	0	0%	0	0%	0	0%	1	0.01%	1	0.01%	2	0.01%	0	0%	4	0.02%
Others	121	0.05%	33	0.03%	13	0.05%	10	0.05%	7	0.05%	14	0.11%	6	0.05%	7	0.06%	14	0.09%	8	0.05%	9	0.04%
Total	256,255	100%	104,806	100%	27,530	100%	20,591	100%	14,382	100%	12,476	100%	11,277	100%	11,643	100%	15,101	100%	17,244	100%	21,205	100%
During the 1930s, annual immigration breakdowns by country or region of birth were compiled by calendar years (January 1 to December 31).

== 1920s ==
Immigrant arrivals by country of origin (1920s)
1. United Kingdom (37.2%)
2. United States (21.1%)
3. Poland and Soviet Union (11.9%)
4. Scandinavia (6.72%)
5. Ireland (5.46%)
6. Italy and Malta (2.31%)
7. Czechoslovakia (2.29%)
8. Yugoslavia and Albania (1.76%)
9. France, Belgium and Luxembourg (1.64%)
10. Other (9.61%)

During the 1920s, 1,247,995 immigrants arrived in Canada. Furthermore, the top ten source countries/regions for immigrants to Canada during the 1920s included United Kingdom (464,308 persons or 37.2 percent), United States (263,078 persons or 21.1 percent), Poland & Soviet Union (148,940 persons or 11.9 percent), Scandinavia (83,915 persons or 6.72 percent), Ireland (68,122 persons or 5.46 percent), Italy & Malta (28,769 persons or 2.31 percent), Czechoslovakia (28,632 persons or 2.29 percent), Yugoslavia & Albania (21,956 persons or 1.76 percent), Germany & Austria (21,263 persons or 1.70 percent), and France & Belgium & Luxembourg (20,468 persons or 1.64 percent).

Immigrant arrivals during the 1920s (1920–1929) by nationality
Country or Region	Total 1920s		1920		1921		1922		1923		1924		1925		1926		1927		1928		1929	
Country or Region	Pop.	%	Pop.	%	Pop.	%	Pop.	%	Pop.	%	Pop.	%	Pop.	%	Pop.	%	Pop.	%	Pop.	%	Pop.	%
United Kingdom	464,308	37.2%	56,852	48.45%	67,878	45.72%	35,448	39.39%	30,840	42.31%	63,200	42.54%	43,799	39.33%	31,424	32.71%	40,794	28.33%	43,540	28.72%	50,533	30.13%
United States	263,078	21.08%	49,711	42.37%	48,169	32.44%	29,412	32.68%	22,039	30.24%	20,655	13.9%	15,914	14.29%	15,548	16.19%	17,915	12.44%	19,419	12.81%	24,296	14.49%
Poland & Soviet Union	148,940	11.93%	243	0.21%	8,391	5.65%	11,520	12.8%	5,970	8.19%	12,350	8.31%	12,620	11.33%	16,157	16.82%	27,360	19%	23,500	15.5%	30,829	18.38%
Scandinavia	83,915	6.72%	708	0.6%	3,106	2.09%	1,768	1.96%	3,029	4.16%	14,982	10.08%	10,828	9.72%	5,687	5.92%	13,794	9.58%	16,631	10.97%	13,382	7.98%
Ireland	68,122	5.46%	2,751	2.34%	6,384	4.3%	3,572	3.97%	3,572	4.9%	9,719	6.54%	9,379	8.42%	5,993	6.24%	9,045	6.28%	8,559	5.65%	9,052	5.4%
(Kingdom of Italy) Italy & Malta	28,769	2.31%	1,570	1.34%	4,020	2.71%	2,447	2.72%	2,131	2.92%	6,527	4.39%	2,375	2.13%	1,706	1.78%	3,382	2.35%	3,718	2.45%	893	0.53%
Czechoslovakia	28,632	2.29%	4	0%	308	0.21%	152	0.17%	101	0.14%	2,757	1.86%	2,084	1.87%	3,263	3.4%	6,685	4.64%	6,039	3.98%	7,239	4.32%
Yugoslavia & Albania	21,956	1.76%	12	0.01%	95	0.06%	186	0.21%	137	0.19%	1,313	0.88%	1,622	1.46%	3,594	3.74%	5,396	3.75%	4,237	2.79%	5,364	3.2%
Germany & Austria	21,263	1.7%	17	0.01%	164	0.11%	193	0.21%	241	0.33%	1,857	1.25%	2,300	2.07%	1,545	1.61%	3,105	2.16%	6,310	4.16%	5,531	3.3%
France & Belgium & Luxembourg	20,468	1.64%	3,132	2.67%	2,522	1.7%	840	0.93%	600	0.82%	2,117	1.43%	1,661	1.49%	1,695	1.76%	2,676	1.86%	3,165	2.09%	2,060	1.23%
Bulgaria & Romania	19,693	1.58%	22	0.02%	973	0.66%	786	0.87%	446	0.61%	1,698	1.14%	2,125	1.91%	1,245	1.3%	2,701	1.88%	4,504	2.97%	5,193	3.1%
Hungary	19,359	1.55%	0	0%	23	0.02%	48	0.05%	23	0.03%	364	0.25%	1,052	0.94%	3,701	3.85%	4,509	3.13%	4,401	2.9%	5,238	3.12%
Newfoundland	14,127	1.13%	443	0.38%	1,042	0.7%	367	0.41%	1,552	2.13%	5,346	3.6%	1,288	1.16%	534	0.56%	992	0.69%	1,054	0.7%	1,509	0.9%
Netherlands	9,440	0.76%	154	0.13%	595	0.4%	183	0.2%	119	0.16%	1,149	0.77%	1,637	1.47%	1,200	1.25%	1,539	1.07%	1,625	1.07%	1,239	0.74%
Baltic states	6,189	0.5%	0	0%	0	0%	19	0.02%	119	0.16%	298	0.2%	194	0.17%	436	0.45%	1,231	0.85%	1,693	1.12%	2,199	1.31%
China	6,112	0.49%	544	0.46%	2,435	1.64%	1,746	1.94%	711	0.98%	674	0.45%	0	0%	0	0%	2	0%	0	0%	0	0%
Switzerland	5,688	0.46%	100	0.09%	235	0.16%	187	0.21%	152	0.21%	1,585	1.07%	680	0.61%	418	0.44%	796	0.55%	843	0.56%	692	0.41%
Japan	4,852	0.39%	711	0.61%	532	0.36%	471	0.52%	369	0.51%	448	0.3%	501	0.45%	421	0.44%	475	0.33%	478	0.32%	446	0.27%
Greece	3,387	0.27%	39	0.03%	357	0.24%	209	0.23%	177	0.24%	292	0.2%	237	0.21%	235	0.24%	389	0.27%	635	0.42%	817	0.49%
Australia & New Zealand	2,461	0.2%	119	0.1%	130	0.09%	101	0.11%	100	0.14%	162	0.11%	269	0.24%	357	0.37%	318	0.22%	461	0.3%	444	0.26%
(Syrian Federation) Syria–Lebanon & Turkey	2,175	0.17%	19	0.02%	459	0.31%	131	0.15%	96	0.13%	313	0.21%	239	0.21%	256	0.27%	314	0.22%	182	0.12%	166	0.1%
Africa	1,305	0.1%	84	0.07%	216	0.15%	76	0.08%	83	0.11%	105	0.07%	129	0.12%	153	0.16%	163	0.11%	148	0.1%	148	0.09%
Armenia	1,195	0.1%	10	0.01%	85	0.06%	70	0.08%	59	0.08%	486	0.33%	304	0.27%	71	0.07%	30	0.02%	53	0.03%	27	0.02%
Caribbean	1,190	0.1%	68	0.06%	136	0.09%	39	0.04%	81	0.11%	66	0.04%	49	0.04%	236	0.25%	144	0.1%	187	0.12%	184	0.11%
Central & South America	432	0.03%	2	0%	5	0%	0	0%	4	0.01%	1	0%	0	0%	71	0.07%	98	0.07%	113	0.07%	138	0.08%
Spain & Portugal	405	0.03%	18	0.02%	206	0.14%	6	0.01%	17	0.02%	39	0.03%	6	0.01%	30	0.03%	31	0.02%	23	0.02%	29	0.02%
India	363	0.03%	0	0%	10	0.01%	13	0.01%	21	0.03%	40	0.03%	46	0.04%	63	0.07%	61	0.04%	56	0.04%	53	0.03%
Persia	68	0.01%	0	0%	1	0%	9	0.01%	1	0%	5	0%	18	0.02%	13	0.01%	13	0.01%	4	0%	4	0%
Others	103	0.01%	3	0%	0	0%	0	0%	1	0%	12	0.01%	6	0.01%	12	0.01%	33	0.02%	19	0.01%	17	0.01%
Total	1,247,995	100%	117,336	100%	148,477	100%	89,999	100%	72,887	100%	148,560	100%	111,362	100%	96,064	100%	143,991	100%	151,597	100%	167,722	100%
During the 1920s, annual immigration breakdowns by nationality were compiled by fiscal years (April 1 to March 31), and not calendar years (January 1 to December 31).

== 1910s ==
Immigrant arrivals by country of origin (1910s)
1. United States (42.4%)
2. United Kingdom (31.1%)
3. Russian Empire (8.58%)
4. Italy (3.48%)
5. Austria-Hungary (2.72%)
6. Ireland (2.14%)
7. Scandinavia (2.01%)
8. China (1.64%)
9. German Empire and Netherlands (1.39%)
10. Other (4.53%)

During the 1910s, 2,067,424 immigrants arrived in Canada. Furthermore, the top ten source countries/regions for immigrants to Canada during the 1910s included United States (876,531 persons or 42.4 percent), United Kingdom (643,156 persons or 31.1 percent), Russian Empire (177,432 persons or 8.58 percent), Italy (72,002 persons or 3.48 percent), Austria–Hungary (56,196 persons or 2.72 percent), Ireland (44,246 persons or 2.14 percent), Scandinavia (41,493 persons or 2.01 percent), China (34,002 persons or 1.64 percent), German Empire & Netherlands (28,764 persons or 1.39 percent), and France & Belgium (23,286 persons or 1.13 percent).

Immigrant arrivals during the 1910s (1910–1919) by nationality
Country or Region	Total 1910s		1910		1911		1912		1913		1914		1915		1916		1917		1918		1919	
Country or Region	Pop.	%	Pop.	%	Pop.	%	Pop.	%	Pop.	%	Pop.	%	Pop.	%	Pop.	%	Pop.	%	Pop.	%	Pop.	%
United States	876,531	42.4%	103,984	49.77%	121,654	39.1%	133,853	37.75%	139,130	34.57%	107,651	27.97%	59,820	41.32%	36,952	76.13%	61,409	81.47%	71,342	90.22%	40,736	70.6%
United Kingdom	643,156	31.11%	55,850	26.73%	116,136	37.33%	129,794	36.61%	140,836	35%	133,037	34.57%	39,751	27.45%	7,846	16.16%	7,324	9.72%	3,004	3.8%	9,578	16.6%
Russian Empire (Note: Including Russia, Poland, and Ruthenia.)	177,432	8.58%	9,160	4.38%	15,438	4.96%	30,466	8.59%	48,476	12.05%	58,798	15.28%	14,674	10.13%	112	0.23%	166	0.22%	74	0.09%	68	0.12%
(Kingdom of Italy) Italy	72,002	3.48%	7,118	3.41%	8,359	2.69%	7,590	2.14%	16,601	4.13%	24,722	6.42%	6,228	4.3%	388	0.8%	758	1.01%	189	0.24%	49	0.08%
Austria–Hungary (Note: Including Austria, Hungary, Bukovina, and Galicia.)	56,196	2.72%	9,448	4.52%	14,213	4.57%	10,317	2.91%	7,666	1.9%	12,265	3.19%	2,260	1.56%	16	0.03%	9	0.01%	0	0%	2	0%
(United Kingdom) Ireland	44,246	2.14%	3,940	1.89%	6,877	2.21%	8,327	2.35%	9,706	2.41%	9,585	2.49%	3,525	2.43%	818	1.69%	958	1.27%	174	0.22%	336	0.58%
Scandinavia	41,493	2.01%	5,239	2.51%	8,299	2.67%	6,565	1.85%	7,729	1.92%	8,428	2.19%	2,634	1.82%	730	1.5%	1,038	1.38%	581	0.73%	250	0.43%
China	34,002	1.64%	2,302	1.1%	5,320	1.71%	6,581	1.86%	7,445	1.85%	5,512	1.43%	1,258	0.87%	89	0.18%	393	0.52%	769	0.97%	4,333	7.51%
German Empire & Netherlands	28,764	1.39%	2,279	1.09%	3,523	1.13%	5,747	1.62%	6,507	1.62%	7,097	1.84%	3,083	2.13%	213	0.44%	160	0.21%	95	0.12%	60	0.1%
France & Belgium	23,286	1.13%	2,637	1.26%	3,604	1.16%	3,695	1.04%	4,581	1.14%	5,334	1.39%	2,355	1.63%	352	0.73%	325	0.43%	133	0.17%	270	0.47%
Bulgaria & Romania	19,898	0.96%	850	0.41%	1,579	0.51%	4,088	1.15%	5,732	1.42%	3,231	0.84%	4,409	3.05%	5	0.01%	4	0.01%	0	0%	0	0%
Newfoundland	13,278	0.64%	3,372	1.61%	2,229	0.72%	2,598	0.73%	1,036	0.26%	496	0.13%	338	0.23%	255	0.53%	1,243	1.65%	1,199	1.52%	512	0.89%
Japan	6,755	0.33%	271	0.13%	437	0.14%	765	0.22%	724	0.18%	856	0.22%	592	0.41%	401	0.83%	648	0.86%	883	1.12%	1,178	2.04%
Greece	6,013	0.29%	452	0.22%	777	0.25%	693	0.2%	1,390	0.35%	1,102	0.29%	1,147	0.79%	145	0.3%	258	0.34%	45	0.06%	4	0.01%
Ottoman Empire (Note: Including Syria–Lebanon and Turkey.)	3,679	0.18%	712	0.34%	593	0.19%	776	0.22%	1,002	0.25%	465	0.12%	112	0.08%	3	0.01%	14	0.02%	2	0%	0	0%
West Indies	2,910	0.14%	146	0.07%	398	0.13%	314	0.09%	398	0.1%	474	0.12%	356	0.25%	38	0.08%	293	0.39%	273	0.35%	220	0.38%
Switzerland	1,530	0.07%	211	0.1%	270	0.09%	230	0.06%	246	0.06%	269	0.07%	209	0.14%	42	0.09%	30	0.04%	12	0.02%	11	0.02%
Australia & New Zealand	1,436	0.07%	285	0.14%	382	0.12%	245	0.07%	145	0.04%	130	0.03%	72	0.05%	50	0.1%	30	0.04%	47	0.06%	50	0.09%
Serbia	1,122	0.05%	76	0.04%	50	0.02%	209	0.06%	366	0.09%	193	0.05%	220	0.15%	6	0.01%	1	0%	0	0%	1	0%
Armenia	435	0.02%	75	0.04%	20	0.01%	60	0.02%	100	0.02%	139	0.04%	36	0.02%	0	0%	3	0%	2	0%	0	0%
India	112	0.01%	10	0%	5	0%	3	0%	5	0%	88	0.02%	0	0%	1	0%	0	0%	0	0%	0	0%
Others	13,148	0.64%	523	0.25%	963	0.31%	1,655	0.47%	2,611	0.65%	5,006	1.3%	1,710	1.18%	76	0.16%	310	0.41%	250	0.32%	44	0.08%
Total	2,067,424	100%	208,940	100%	311,126	100%	354,571	100%	402,432	100%	384,878	100%	144,789	100%	48,538	100%	75,374	100%	79,074	100%	57,702	100%
During the 1910s, annual immigration breakdowns by nationality were compiled by fiscal years (April 1 to March 31), and not calendar years (January 1 to December 31).

== 1900s ==
Immigrant arrivals by country of origin (1900s)
1. United Kingdom (38.2%)
2. United States (31.2%)
3. Austria-Hungary (7.52%)
4. Russian Empire (5.37%)
5. Italy (3.75%)
6. Scandinavia (3.17%)
7. China (1.97%)
8. German Empire and Netherlands (1.70%)
9. France and Belgium (1.46%)
10. Other (5.62%)

During the 1900s, 1,290,046 immigrants arrived in Canada. Furthermore, the top ten source countries/regions for immigrants to Canada during the 1900s included United Kingdom (493,341 persons or 38.2 percent), United States (402,451 persons or 31.2 percent), Austria–Hungary (97,032 persons or 7.52 percent), Russian Empire (69,288 persons or 5.37 percent), Italy (48,340 persons or 3.75 percent), Scandinavia (40,903 persons or 3.17 percent), China (25,440 persons or 1.97 percent), German Empire & Netherlands (21,989 persons or 1.70 percent), France & Belgium (18,831 persons or 1.46 percent), and Ireland (14,064 persons or 1.09 percent).

Immigrant arrivals during the 1900s (1900–1909) by nationality
Country or Region	Total 1900s		1900^{1}		1901^{2}		1902^{2}		1903^{2}		1904^{2}		1905^{2}		1906^{2}		1907^{3}		1908^{4}		1909^{4}	
Country or Region	Pop.	%	Pop.	%	Pop.	%	Pop.	%	Pop.	%	Pop.	%	Pop.	%	Pop.	%	Pop.	%	Pop.	%	Pop.	%
United Kingdom	493,341	38.24%	4,798	17.04%	11,740	22.71%	16,947	23.88%	41,369	30.94%	49,683	36.75%	64,589	44.14%	85,999	45.45%	55,289	44.28%	113,635	43.24%	49,292	33.5%
United States	402,451	31.2%	8,543	30.35%	18,055	34.93%	26,461	37.29%	49,473	37%	45,229	33.46%	43,652	29.83%	57,919	30.61%	34,748	27.83%	58,445	22.24%	59,926	40.73%
Austria–Hungary	97,032	7.52%	5,517	19.6%	5,476	10.59%	7,918	11.16%	12,996	9.72%	10,914	8.07%	10,177	6.95%	9,490	5.02%	3,463	2.77%	20,400	7.76%	10,681	7.26%
Russian Empire	69,288	5.37%	1,310	4.65%	1,044	2.02%	2,467	3.48%	7,571	5.66%	5,682	4.2%	9,893	6.76%	10,789	5.7%	9,261	7.42%	15,647	5.95%	5,624	3.82%
(Kingdom of Italy) Italy	48,340	3.75%	—N/a	—N/a	4,710	9.11%	3,828	5.39%	3,371	2.52%	4,445	3.29%	3,473	2.37%	7,959	4.21%	5,114	4.1%	11,212	4.27%	4,228	2.87%
Scandinavia	40,903	3.17%	714	2.54%	2,432	4.71%	3,743	5.27%	7,182	5.37%	5,048	3.73%	5,441	3.72%	4,962	2.62%	3,345	2.68%	5,285	2.01%	2,751	1.87%
China	25,440	1.97%	4,257	15.12%	2,544	4.92%	3,587	5.05%	5,329	3.99%	4,847	3.59%	77	0.05%	168	0.09%	291	0.23%	2,234	0.85%	2,106	1.43%
German Empire & Netherlands	21,989	1.7%	476	1.69%	1,009	1.95%	1,083	1.53%	2,384	1.78%	3,823	2.83%	3,187	2.18%	2,250	1.19%	2,362	1.89%	3,645	1.39%	1,770	1.2%
France & Belgium	18,831	1.46%	253	0.9%	492	0.95%	654	0.92%	1,240	0.93%	2,392	1.77%	2,539	1.73%	2,754	1.46%	1,964	1.57%	3,885	1.48%	2,658	1.81%
(United Kingdom) Ireland	14,064	1.09%	343	1.22%	70	0.14%	312	0.44%	423	0.32%	691	0.51%	770	0.53%	797	0.42%	502	0.4%	6,547	2.49%	3,609	2.45%
Japan	12,420	0.96%	—N/a	—N/a	6	0.01%	0	0%	0	0%	0	0%	354	0.24%	1,922	1.02%	2,042	1.64%	7,601	2.89%	495	0.34%
Newfoundland	7,895	0.61%	—N/a	—N/a	0	0%	0	0%	335	0.25%	519	0.38%	190	0.13%	340	0.18%	1,029	0.82%	3,374	1.28%	2,108	1.43%
Bulgaria & Romania	6,943	0.54%	—N/a	—N/a	152	0.29%	552	0.78%	445	0.33%	633	0.47%	272	0.19%	467	0.25%	610	0.49%	3,478	1.32%	334	0.23%
Ottoman Empire	6,380	0.49%	—N/a	—N/a	501	0.97%	1,083	1.53%	890	0.67%	398	0.29%	660	0.45%	693	0.37%	509	0.41%	1,221	0.46%	425	0.29%
India	5,185	0.4%	—N/a	—N/a	0	0%	0	0%	0	0%	0	0%	45	0.03%	387	0.2%	2,124	1.7%	2,623	1%	6	0%
Greece	2,768	0.21%	—N/a	—N/a	81	0.16%	161	0.23%	193	0.14%	191	0.14%	98	0.07%	254	0.13%	545	0.44%	1,053	0.4%	192	0.13%
Australia & New Zealand	1,516	0.12%	—N/a	—N/a	3	0.01%	11	0.02%	48	0.04%	81	0.06%	261	0.18%	411	0.22%	215	0.17%	250	0.1%	236	0.16%
Armenia	1,378	0.11%	—N/a	—N/a	62	0.12%	112	0.16%	113	0.08%	81	0.06%	78	0.05%	82	0.04%	208	0.17%	563	0.21%	79	0.05%
Switzerland	1,006	0.08%	—N/a	—N/a	30	0.06%	17	0.02%	73	0.05%	128	0.09%	150	0.1%	172	0.09%	112	0.09%	195	0.07%	129	0.09%
West Indies	686	0.05%	—N/a	—N/a	0	0%	0	0%	23	0.02%	55	0.04%	77	0.05%	194	0.1%	90	0.07%	134	0.05%	113	0.08%
Serbia	144	0.01%	—N/a	—N/a	23	0.04%	0	0%	2	0%	10	0.01%	7	0%	19	0.01%	4	0%	48	0.02%	31	0.02%
Others	12,046	0.93%	1,941	6.89%	3,256	6.3%	2,032	2.86%	233	0.17%	328	0.24%	353	0.24%	1,186	0.63%	1,039	0.83%	1,344	0.51%	334	0.23%
Total	1,290,046	100%	28,152	100%	51,686	100%	70,968	100%	133,693	100%	135,178	100%	146,343	100%	189,214	100%	124,866	100%	262,819	100%	147,127	100%
^{1}Figures for 1900 are for six months from January 1 to June 30.^{2}Figures for 1901 until 1906 are for fiscal years running from July 1 to June 30.^{3}Figures for 1907 are for nine months from July 1, 1906 to March 31, 1907.^{4}Figures for 1908 and 1909 are for fiscal years running from April 1 to March 31.

== 1890s ==
Immigrant arrivals in Canada by country of birth (1899)
Country	Number	Percentage
United States	11,945	26.82%
England and Wales	8576	19.25%
Russia	7350	16.5%
Spain	6700	15.04%
Scandinavia	1526	3.43%
(United Kingdom) Ireland	1337	3%
Scotland	747	1.68%
Germany	780	1.75%
France and Belgium	413	0.93%
Others	5169	11.6%
Total	44,543	100%

Immigrant arrivals in Canada by country of birth (1898)
Country	Number	Percentage
England and Wales	9,475	29.7%
USA	9,119	28.59%
Spain	5,509	17.27%
Scotland	1,400	4.39%
(United Kingdom) Ireland	733	2.3%
Scandinavia	724	2.27%
Germany	563	1.76%
France and Belgium	545	1.71%
Others	3832	12.01%
Total	31,900	100%

== 1860s ==
Immigrant arrivals in Canada by country of birth (1865)
Country	Number	Percentage
England	9,296	43.53%
Europe	4,770	22.34%
(United Kingdom) Ireland	4,682	21.92%
Scotland	2,601	12.18%
Others	6	0.03%
Total	21,355	100%

Immigrant arrivals in Canada by country of birth (1864)
Country	Number	Percentage
Europe	7,453	38.93%
England	5,013	26.18%
(United Kingdom) Ireland	3,767	19.67%
Scotland	2,914	15.22%
Others	—N/a	—N/a
Total	19,147	100%

Immigrant arrivals in Canada by country of birth (1863)
Country	Number	Percentage
England	6,317	32.53%
(United Kingdom) Ireland	4,949	25.49%
Europe	4,182	21.54%
Scotland	3,959	20.39%
Others	12	0.06%
Total	19,419	100%

Immigrant arrivals in Canada by country of birth (1862)
Country	Number	Percentage
Europe	7,728	34.85%
England	6,877	31.01%
(United Kingdom) Ireland	4,545	20.5%
Scotland	2,979	13.43%
Others	47	0.21%
Total	22,176	100%

Immigrant arrivals in Canada by country of birth (1861)
Country	Number	Percentage
Europe	10,618	53.3%
England	7,780	39.05%
Scotland	1,112	5.58%
(United Kingdom) Ireland	413	2.07%
Others	—N/a	—N/a
Total	19,923	100%

Immigrant arrivals in Canada by country of birth (1860)
Country	Number	Percentage
England	6,481	63.85%
Europe	2,314	22.8%
Scotland	979	9.65%
(United Kingdom) Ireland	376	3.7%
Others	—N/a	—N/a
Total	10,150	100%

== 1850s ==
Immigrant arrivals in Canada by country of birth (1859)
Country	Number	Percentage
England	4,846	55.21%
Europe	2,722	31.01%
Scotland	793	9.03%
(United Kingdom) Ireland	417	4.75%
Others	—N/a	—N/a
Total	8,778	100%

Immigrant arrivals in Canada by country of birth (1858)
Country	Number	Percentage
England	6,441	50.28%
Europe	3,578	27.93%
Scotland	1,424	11.12%
(United Kingdom) Ireland	1,153	9%
Others	214	1.67%
Total	12,810	100%

Immigrant arrivals in Canada by country of birth (1857)
Country	Number	Percentage
England	15,471	48.2%
Europe	11,368	35.42%
Scotland	3,218	10.03%
(United Kingdom) Ireland	2,016	6.28%
Others	24	0.07%
Total	32,097	100%

Immigrant arrivals in Canada by country of birth (1856)
Country	Number	Percentage
England	10,353	46.14%
Europe	7,343	32.72%
Scotland	2,794	12.45%
(United Kingdom) Ireland	1,688	7.52%
Others	261	1.16%
Total	22,439	100%

Immigrant arrivals in Canada by country of birth (1855)
Country	Number	Percentage
England	6,754	31.75%
Scotland	4,859	22.84%
Europe	4,864	22.86%
(United Kingdom) Ireland	4,106	19.3%
Others	691	3.25%
Total	21,274	100%

Immigrant arrivals in Canada by country of birth (1854)
Country	Number	Percentage
England	18,175	34.18%
(United Kingdom) Ireland	16,165	30.4%
Europe	11,537	21.69%
Scotland	6,446	12.12%
Others	857	1.61%
Total	53,180	100%

Immigrant arrivals in Canada by country of birth (1853)
Country	Number	Percentage
(United Kingdom) Ireland	14,417	39.28%
England	9,585	26.12%
Europe	7,456	20.32%
Scotland	4,745	12.93%
Others	496	1.35%
Total	36,699	100%

Immigrant arrivals in Canada by country of birth (1852)
Country	Number	Percentage
(United Kingdom) Ireland	15,983	40.8%
England	9,276	23.68%
Europe	7,256	18.52%
Scotland	5,477	13.98%
Others	1,184	3.02%
Total	39,176	100%

== See also ==
- Canada immigration statistics
- Immigration to Canada
- History of immigration to Canada
- Population of Canada by year
