= Separate school =

Type of school in some Canadian provinces

The British North America Act, 1867 (now the Constitution Act, 1867), which provides a constitutional guarantee for separate schools in some provinces

In Canada, a separate school is a publicly funded school with a religious component that has constitutional status in three provinces (Ontario, Alberta and Saskatchewan), and statutory status in the three territories (Northwest Territories, Yukon and Nunavut). In these Canadian jurisdictions, a separate school is one operated by a civil authority—a separate school board—with a mandate enshrined in the Canadian Constitution (for the three provinces) or in federal statutes (for the three territories). In these six jurisdictions a civil electorate, composed of the members of the minority faith, elects separate school trustees according to the province's or territory's local authorities election legislation. These trustees are legally accountable to their electorate and to the provincial or territorial government. No church has a constitutional, legal, or proprietary interest in a separate school.

The constitutionally provided mandate of a separate school jurisdiction and of a separate school is to provide education in a school setting that the separate school board considers reflective of Roman Catholic (or, rarely, Protestant) theology, doctrine, and practices. This mandate can manifest itself in the Program of Studies and the curriculum, exercises and practices, and staffing. The limits of this mandate are determined by the application of section 93 of the Constitution Act, 1867, the Canadian Charter of Rights and Freedoms, and judicial decisions.

The different experience in Ontario as compared to Alberta and Saskatchewan is principally the result of the same constitutional provisions having effect on settlement at different stages in Canadian history.

The Constitution of Canada does not establish separate school education as a natural or unconditional right available to all. Only Protestants or Roman Catholics, whichever is the minority faith population compared to the other in a community, can consider the establishment of separate school education. The separate school establishment right is not available to citizens of any other faith such as Orthodox Christians, Jews, Mormons, Muslims, Hindus or Sikhs. In addition, the minority faith must establish that they wish to leave the public school system and create a separate school system.

== History ==
=== Demographic background ===
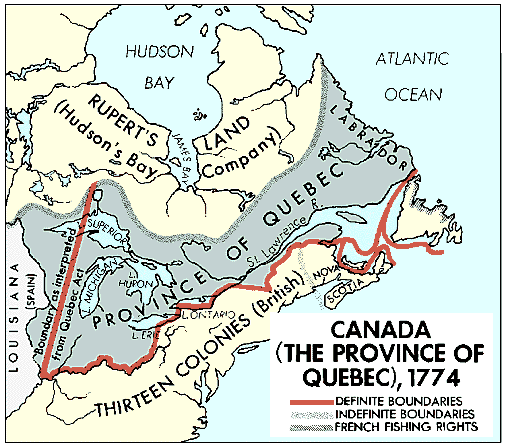
The old Province of Quebec, including what became Lower Canada and Upper Canada

The separate school issue arose in the Province of Canada, prior to Canadian Confederation in 1867, but had its roots in the British acquisition of the French colony of Canada, in the conquest of 1759-1760. The inhabitants of New France were almost entirely French-speaking and Catholic. The territory acquired by Britain included the French settlements along the River St. Lawrence, now the province of Quebec, and also included the territory along the lower Great Lakes, which is now southern Ontario.

After the American Revolution, the new colony was flooded with Anglo-Protestant political refugees, the United Empire Loyalists. Large numbers of them settled in what became known as the Eastern Townships and in Montreal, creating a substantial Anglo-Protestant minority. They also settled in what became Ontario, establishing an area with an Anglo-Protestant majority. To accommodate these new settlers, the British Parliament passed the Constitutional Act, 1791, which divided the territory into two provinces: Lower Canada, which eventually became Quebec, and Upper Canada, which eventually became Ontario. The result was that Lower Canada was largely francophone and Catholic, with a substantial British-Protestant minority, while Upper Canada was largely anglophone and Protestant, but with a Catholic minority, some francophone, and some anglophones (largely Irish and Scottish Catholics).

That situation continued until 1841, when the British Parliament passed the Act of Union, 1840, to reunite Lower Canada and Upper Canada into the single Province of Canada. Although the Province of Canada was in form a unitary province, in practice the differences between the two areas meant that many laws were passed that only applied to one or the other area, recognising the significant differences in language, religion and culture.

Schools of the era were almost entirely parochial schools controlled by the various churches. Over time, the government of the Province of Canada began to regulate the schools.

=== Impact of Protestant and Catholic tensions on schools ===
In the 1840s Methodist minister and Reformist politician Egerton Ryerson championed "common schools" that would educate the children of all faiths under one system. He became Chief Superintendent of Education for Upper Canada in 1844. However, Ryerson was not able to convince the Catholic minority and grudgingly agreed to clauses in his education reforms that allowed for minority-faith schools within the publicly funded system. The Catholic case was strengthened by the fact that the Protestant minority in Lower Canada had already won the right to a separate system.

The institutionalization of separate schools in Canada West (Upper Canada before 1840) was secured by the Scott Act of 1863, but with the caveat that rural Catholic schools could only serve an area with a radius of 3 miles (4.8 km).

In the Maritime provinces, similar issues were at play. In 1864, the government of Nova Scotia reformed its educational system. It withdrew support from all schools which were religious or which used any language other than English as a medium of instruction.

In New Brunswick under the Parish Schools Act of 1858, there was only loose supervision from the central board of education, and in practice each school was run independently by its board of trustees, and most schools boards were dominated by partisans from one religion or another. Textbooks were not standardized; Protestant-majority regions used the textbooks of the Irish National Schools while the English-speaking Catholic areas used the books of the Irish Christian Brothers. The few Acadian schools used French-language textbooks from Canada East (Lower Canada).

=== Confederation agreement ===
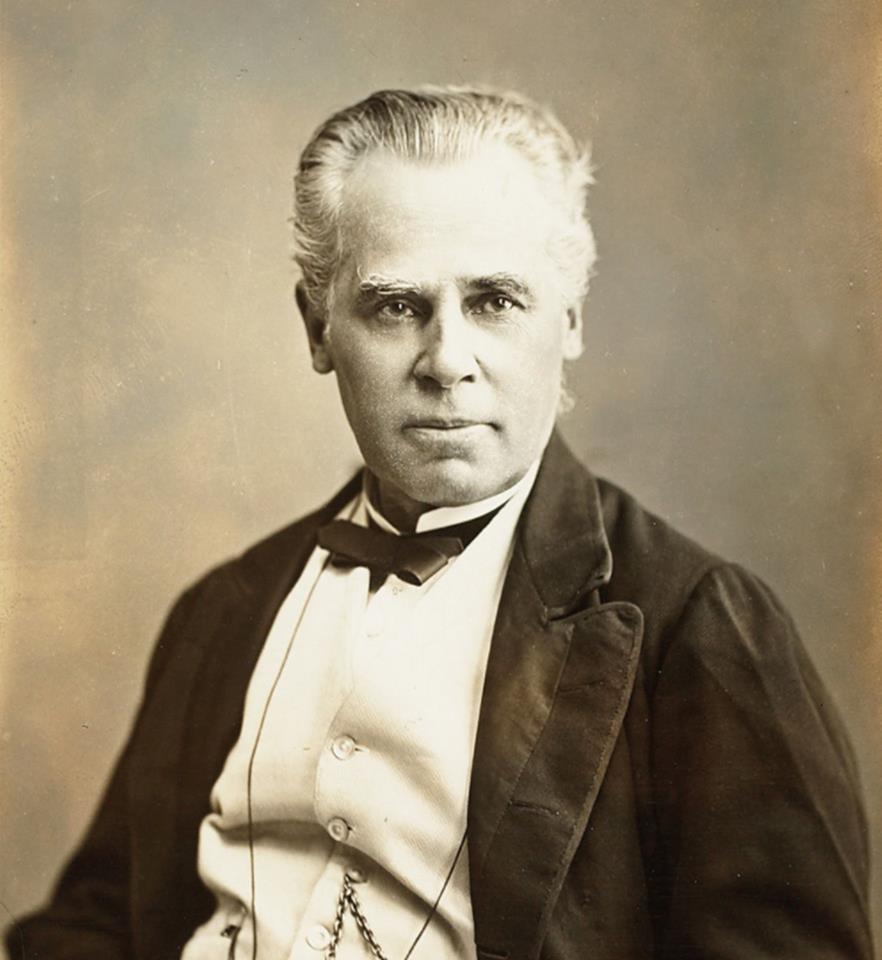
George-Etienne Cartier, one of the Fathers of Confederation, and an advocate for Catholic schools in Quebec

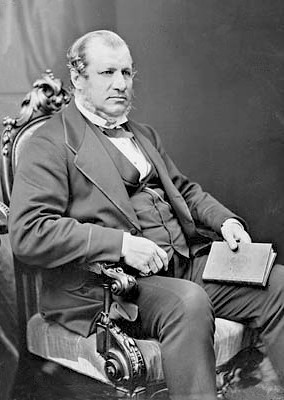
Alexander Galt, another Father of Confederation, who advocated for Protestant schools for the anglophone minority in Quebec

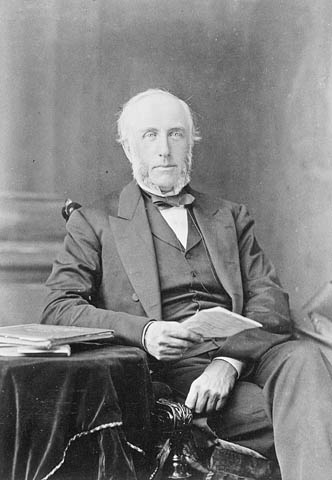
George Brown, a Father of Confederation from Ontario, who opposed separate schools entirely

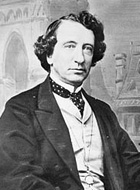
John A. Macdonald, another Father of Confederation, who somehow had to put it all together

Retention of separate school boards with public funding was a major issue of contention in the negotiations that led to Canadian Confederation, chiefly as a result of ethnic and religious tension between the (largely French-speaking) Roman Catholic population in Canada and the Protestant majority. The issue was a subject of debate at the 1864 Quebec Conference and was finally resolved at the London Conference of 1866 with a proposal to preserve the separate school systems in Quebec and Ontario. The way in which this agreement was written into the British North America Act, 1867 was to the effect that the condition of education in each colony or territory at the time it entered Confederation would be continued thereafter.

Consequently, the provinces of British Columbia, New Brunswick, Nova Scotia, and Prince Edward Island have never had an education system that included "separate schools".

These pre-existing rights for tax-funded minority faith schools were then part of the constitutional negotiations surrounding Canadian Confederation in the 1860s. At the London Conference of 1866, Roman Catholic Archbishop Connolly of Halifax lobbied the delegates separate Catholic and Protestant school systems across the entire federation, administered by the central government. This was forcefully rejected by French Canadian delegates from Canada East, who demanded provincial control over education. The compromise was section 93 of the Constitution Act, 1867 which allows the federal government to intervene only to protect minority schools which are established after Confederation. Apart from that caveat, section 93 provides that education is a matter of exclusive provincial jurisdiction.

== Provinces and territories with separate schools ==
The relevant provision for Ontario is s. 93(1) of the Constitution Act, 1867 as originally enacted. For Alberta and Saskatchewan, the relevant provision is s. 93(1), as amended by the Alberta Act and the Saskatchewan Act, respectively.

As held by the Supreme Court of Canada in Adler v. Ontario, the provincial education power under section 93 of the Constitution Act, 1867 is plenary, and is not subject to Charter attack. As Iacobucci J. noted, it is the product of a historical compromise crucial to Confederation and forms a comprehensive code with respect to denominational school rights which cannot be enlarged through the operation of s. 2(a) of the Charter. It does not represent a guarantee of fundamental freedoms.

=== Ontario ===
School boards funded by the province consist of 29 English Catholic and 8 French Catholic boards, as well as 35 non-denominational public school boards (31 English public, 4 French public). There is one Protestant separate school jurisdiction in Ontario, the Burkevale Protestant Separate School, operated by the Penetanguishene Protestant Separate School Board. In Ontario, this determination was largely made throughout the province by the time of Confederation.

The public school system in the province was historically Protestant but was gradually transformed into a secular public system. Prayer in public schools was banned in the late 1980s by a decision of the Ontario Court of Appeal.

Since the 19th century, funding for the Roman Catholic separate school system was provided up to Grade 10 under the British North America (BNA) Act. In 1984, the government of Premier William Davis extended full funding to include the last three (Grades 11–13 (OAC)) years of Roman Catholic secondary schools after having rejected that proposal fifteen years earlier. The first funded academic year occurred in 1985–86, as grade 11, and one grade was added in each of the next two years.

The right to have a publicly funded separate denominational school system continues to be guaranteed to Roman Catholics in Ontario by s. 93 of the Constitution Act, 1867.

The issue of extending public funding to other religious schools was raised by the Progressive Conservative Party of Ontario in the 2007 Ontario general election; however they lost the election and the issue was not raised again in the subsequent election.

==== Opposition ====
The question of separate schools has been most controversial in Ontario, where the issue of separate schools aggravated tensions between anglophones and francophones, both Protestant and Catholic.

Opposition to publicly funded separate schools continues in Ontario, where court cases have been filed by groups organized to actively seek to end or limit public funding for Catholic schools. These groups include OneSchoolSystem.org and Civil Rights in Public Education.

Separate school rights have often been criticized as contrary to the spirit of official multiculturalism, primarily, but not exclusively, because only adherents of the Protestant or Roman Catholic faith have these constitutional rights and only in some provinces and territories. In addition, where separate school systems exist, employees or prospective employees who are of the minority faith have more employment opportunities. All other things being equal, a member of the minority faith can be employed by either the public board or by the separate board, while anyone else can be excluded from employment by the separate system.

On November 5, 1999, in the case of Waldman v. Canada, the United Nations Human Rights Committee condemned Canada and Ontario for having violated the equality provisions (Article 26) of the International Covenant on Civil and Political Rights. The Committee restated its concerns on November 2, 2005, when it published its Concluding Observations regarding Canada's fifth periodic report under the Covenant. The Committee observed that Canada had failed to "adopt steps in order to eliminate discrimination on the basis of religion in the funding of schools in Ontario."

=== Alberta ===
In Alberta, the extent of separate school education is more limited and there continues to be large areas of the province where separate school education has never been established. Protestant separate schools are slightly more present.

Approximately 25 percent of children attend a Catholic school in Alberta, with about 40% of the land area of the province is included in separate school jurisdictions. There are two Protestant Separate School Districts, in the City of St. Albert (St. Albert Protestant Separate School District) and in the Town of St. Paul (Glen Avon Protestant Separate School District). One anomaly of the system is that the Town of Morinville has only a public Catholic high school, part of the Greater St. Albert Catholic Regional Division, and no secular or Protestant high schools of any kind.

In the province, the geographic basis for separate school establishment is the underlying public school district. At any time, three or more residents, either Protestant or Roman Catholic, who believe that they are members of the minority faith locally, can initiate the process. A census must be conducted to confirm that they are, in fact, the minority faith locally. When the census confirms minority status, a meeting must be widely advertised. The purpose of meeting is to provide a venue at which all of the local members of the minority faith can debate the pros and cons of leaving the public school jurisdiction and creating a separate school district. At the end of the meeting, a vote may be held on the question of establishment.

If the majority of the minority vote in favour of establishment, the establishment becomes a fact. If the majority of the minority vote against establishment, it does not proceed. The process is civil, democratic, and binding on the minority of the minority. A decision at the meeting against establishment precludes a number of the minority faith who may have favoured establishment from continuing for themselves. At the same time, any decision against establishment has no term: proponents can begin almost immediately to organize a subsequent effort.

In Alberta, wherever a separate school system exists, individuals who are of the minority faith that established the separate school system must be residents, electors, and ratepayers of the separate school system, as decided in the Schmidt decision. There is no way by which they could opt to be supporters of the public school system except by leaving the minority faith. In Saskatchewan and Ontario, members of the minority faith may choose to be supporters of the public school system, notwithstanding their faith.

=== Northewest Territory, Yukon, and Nunavut ===
Section 93 of the Constitution Act, 1867 only applies to provinces, not territories. Instead, the right to separate schools is protected in the three territories by the federal Acts of Parliament which establish those three territories. The Northwest Territories Act, the Yukon Act and the Nunavut Act all provide that the territorial legislatures can legislate with respect to education, provided they respect the right of religious minorities, whether Protestant or Roman Catholic, to establish separate schools.

== Provincial abolition of separate schools ==
=== Manitoba ===
In Manitoba, the ending of public support for separate schools occurred in 1890 with an amendment to the Public Schools Act. This set off a national crisis known as the Manitoba Schools Question. In 1896, a compromise was reached between Prime Minister Wilfrid Laurier and Premier of Manitoba Thomas Greenway, called the Laurier–Greenway Compromise. This agreement did not reverse the 1890 legislation; instead, it allowed for religious instruction (i.e., Catholic education) in Manitoba's public schools, under certain conditions, for 30 minutes at the end of each day. In response to the compromise, Pope Leo XIII wrote the 1897 papal encyclical Affari vos, encouraging Catholics to accept the compromise.

=== Quebec ===
Up until 1997 the Quebec education system was also separated, with Protestant and Catholic school boards. The system was replaced by a linguistically based secular school system, after the passage of a constitutional amendment.

=== Newfoundland and Labrador ===
The province of Newfoundland and Labrador also had a separate school system until 1997. At the time that the Dominion of Newfoundland joined Canada on March 31, 1949, the Newfoundland schools were all organized on a confessional basis with separate denominational schools for Roman Catholics, Seventh-day Adventists, Salvationists, Pentecostals, and an integrated stream which oversaw the schooling for children of many members of so-called "mainstream" Protestant denominations. All of these schools received grants from the provincial government for their operation. Ownership of the schools ranged from parochial, in which case they were owned and operated directly by a church, to ownership and operation by a separate not-for-profit society. The constitutional obligation on the province to maintain this system of confessional schools was eliminated by the Constitution Amendment, 1998 (Newfoundland Act), following a provincial referendum in 1997. The province then established a single non-denominational public school system.

== See also ==
- Education in Canada
- Education in Quebec
- Education in Ontario
