= History of Manitoba =

The history of Manitoba covers the period from the arrival of Paleo-Indians thousands of years ago to the present day. When European fur traders first travelled to the area present-day Manitoba, they developed trade networks with several First Nations. European fur traders in the area during the late-17th century, with the French under Pierre Gaultier de Varennes, sieur de La Vérendrye set up several trading post forts. In 1670, Britain declared sovereignty over the watershed of Hudson's Bay, known as Rupert's Land; with the Hudson's Bay Company granted a commercial monopoly over the territory.

At the end of the French and Indian War in 1763, the French colony of New France was ceded to the British, ending any competition between European claims to the North-West. Traders from the Hudson's Bay Company expanded their operations to areas formerly occupied by French fur trading forts. In 1811, Lord Selkirk established the first agricultural settler colony in Rupert's Land, the Red River Colony, around the Red River of the North. In 1817 Saulteaux Chief Peguis and four other Chiefs of the Sauteaux and Cree Nations agreed to share land with Lord Selkirk and his settlers in the Peguis Selkirk Treaty. As a result of the Treaty of 1818 between the United Kingdom and the United States the 49th parallel north was established as the border between Rupert's Land and the United States; with areas south of the parallel being transferred to the United States.

In 1870, the Deed of Surrender was enacted, transferring Rupert's Land from the United Kingdom to Government of Canada, forming the North-West Territories. In response to the Red River Rebellion, the province of Manitoba was established around the lands of the Red River Colony. Canada started a process of Numbered Treaties with the First Nations to settle aboriginal title in the North-West and clear land for settlers. Manitoba is the first province created from the North-West Territories, and was subsequently expanded in 1881 and 1912 to its present boundaries. The economy was long based on farming, grains, cattle, and hay. The economy is now diversified due to urbanization.

== Early history ==
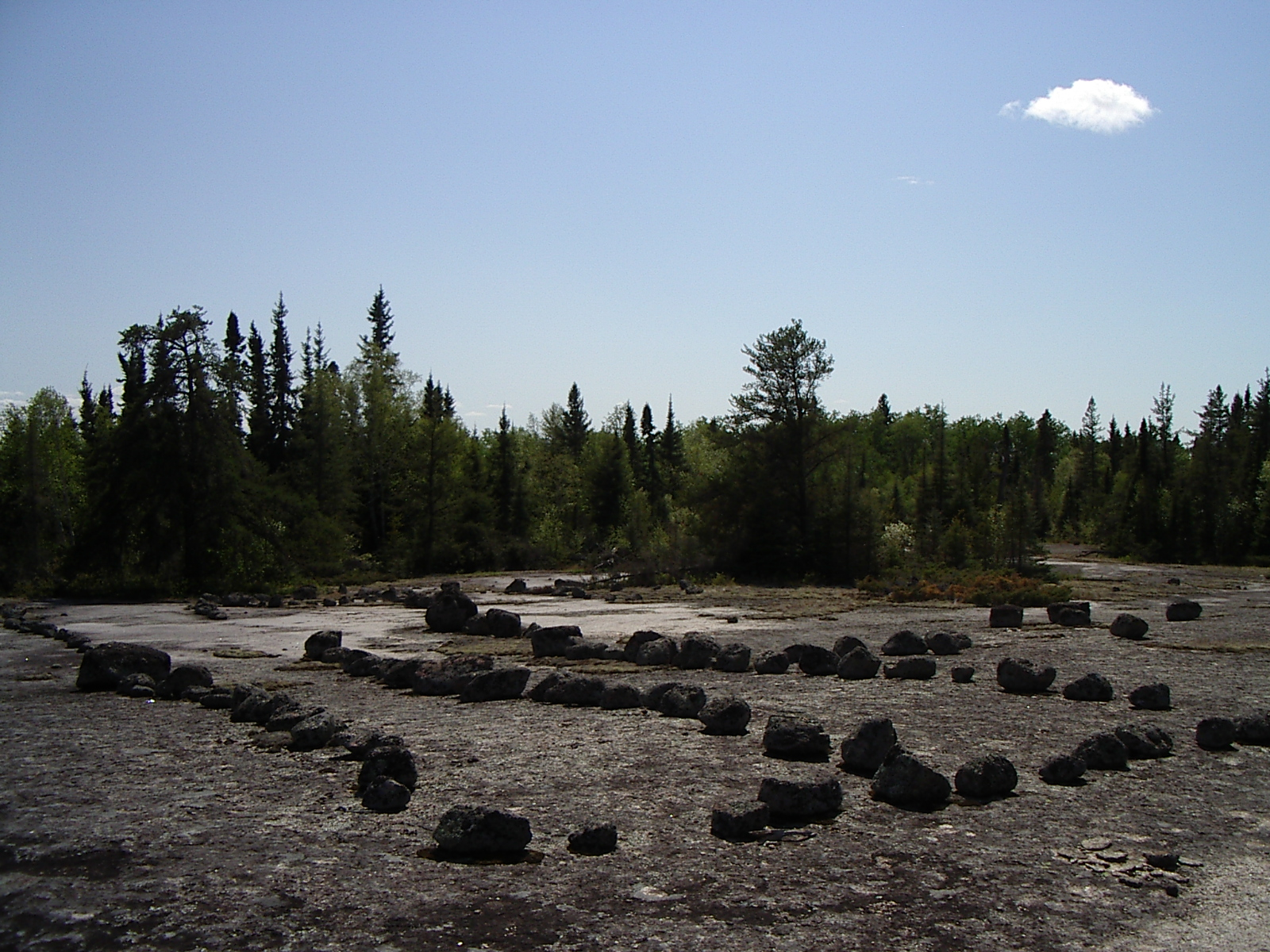
Petroforms at Whiteshell Provincial Park. The site is hypothesized to be a First Nations gathering place or trading centre.

The geographical area of modern-day Manitoba was inhabited by the First Nations people shortly after the last ice age glaciers retreated in the south-west approximately 10,000 years ago; the first exposed land was the Turtle Mountain area. The first humans in southern Manitoba left behind pottery shards, spear and arrow heads, copper, petroforms, pictographs, fish and animal bones, and signs of agriculture along the Red River near Lockport, Manitoba, where corn and other seed crops were planted.

Eventually there were aboriginal settlements of Ojibwa, Cree, Dene, Sioux, Mandan, and Assiniboine peoples, along with other tribes that entered the area to trade. There were many land trails made as a part of a larger native trading network on both land and water. The Whiteshell Provincial Park region along the Winnipeg River has many old petroforms and may have been a trading centre, or even a place of learning and sharing of knowledge for over 2000 years. The cowry shells and copper are proof of what was traded as a part of a large trading network to the oceans, and to the larger southern native civilizations along the Mississippi and in the south and south-west.

In Northern Manitoba there are areas that were mined for quartz to make arrow heads. For thousands of years there have been humans living in this region, and there are many clues about their ways of life.

=== European exploration ===
Henry Hudson, in 1611, was one of the first Europeans to sail into what is now known as Hudson Bay. The first European to reach what is now northern Manitoba was Sir Thomas Button in 1612, who named the Nelson River. Button was a member of the "Company of the Merchants Discoverers of the North-West Passage" and he hoped to find a trade route to China. Henry Kelsey was the first European to travel from Hudson Bay to the prairies, reporting the buffalo and grizzly bears that he saw. Kelsey went as far as present day Saskatchewan. The Hudson's Bay Company traded with native fur traders that canoed far and wide along the many rivers of present-day Manitoba. Rupert's Land was the first name given to the area by Europeans, encompassing the Hudson Bay watershed. Pierre Gaultier de Varennes, sieur de La Vérendrye, visited the Red River Valley in the 1730s as part of opening the area for French exploration and exploitation. As French explorers entered the area, a Montreal-based company, the North West Company, began trading with the Métis.

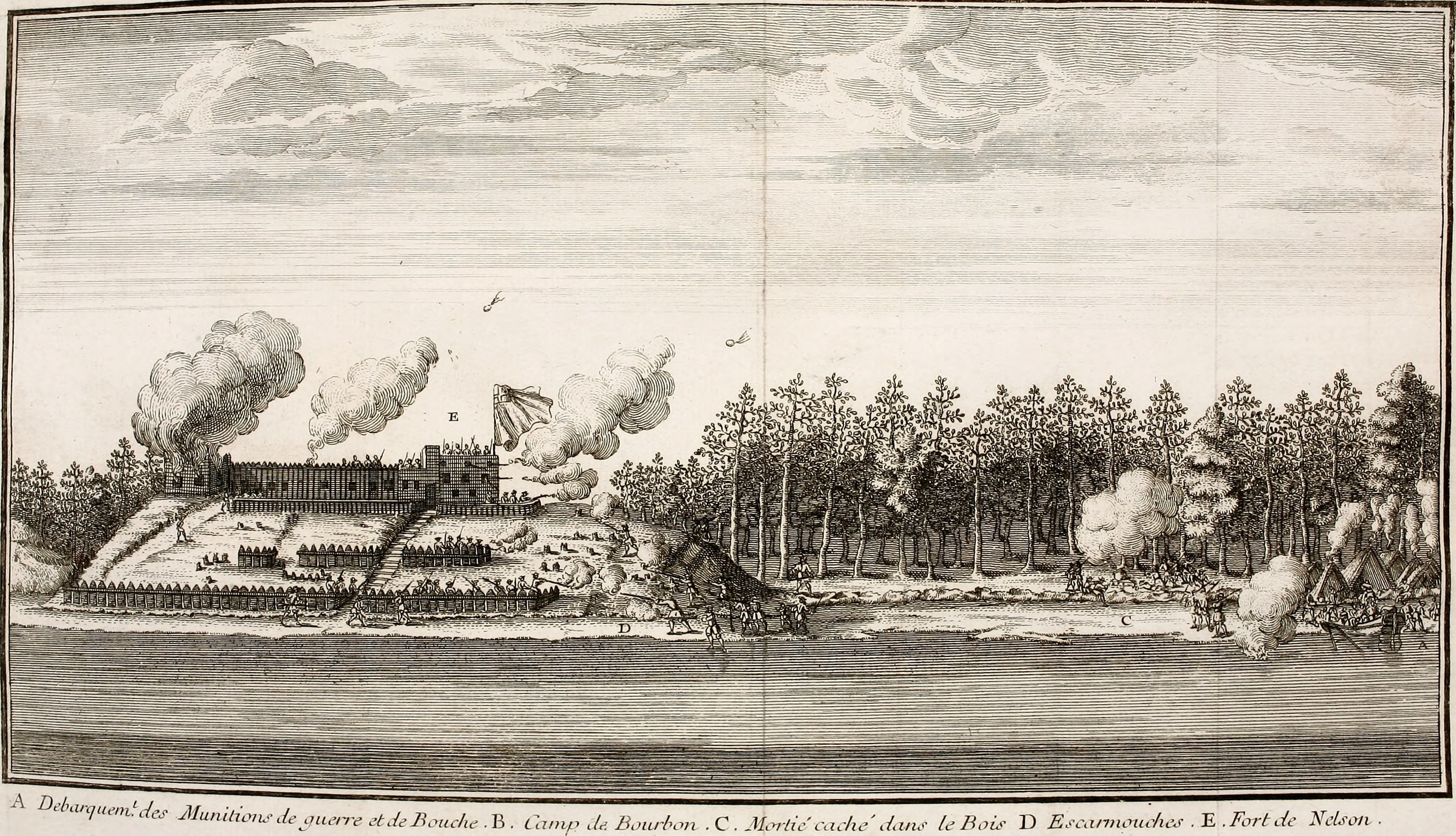
Depiction of French forces attacking York Factory in 1697

When the British ship Nonsuch sailed into Hudson Bay in 1668–1669, she was the first fur trading vessel to reach the area; that voyage led to the formation of the Hudson's Bay Company, to which the British government gave absolute control of the entire Hudson Bay watershed. This watershed was named Rupert's Land, after Prince Rupert, who helped to subsidize the Hudson's Bay Company. York Factory was founded in 1684 after the original fort of the Hudson's Bay Company, Fort Nelson (built in 1682), was destroyed by rival French traders. Shortly after the Battle of Hudson's Bay, York Factory was briefly occupied by French forces. Fur trading forts were built by both the North West Company and the Hudson's Bay Company along the many rivers and lakes, and there was often fierce competition with each other in more southern areas.

There are a few possible sources for the name "Manitoba". The more likely is that it comes from Cree or Ojibwe and means "strait of the Manitou (spirit)". It may also be from the Assiniboine for "Lake of the Prairie".

== British territory ==
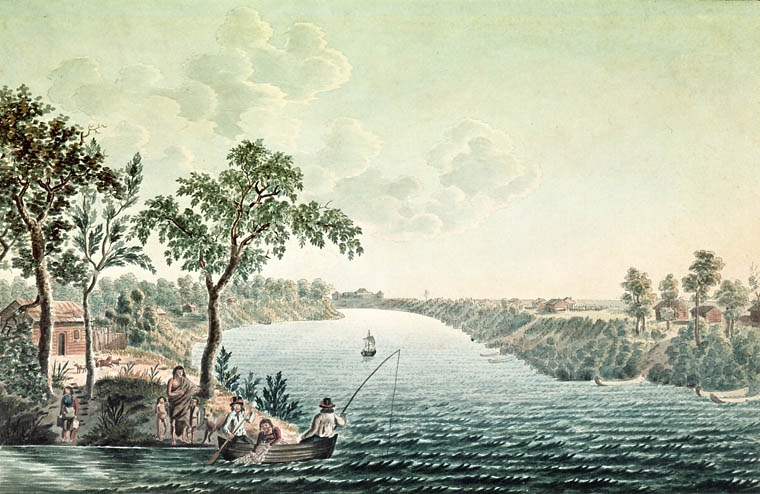
The Selkirk Settlement in 1822. The settlement was the first permanent agricultural settlement near the junction of the Red and Assiniboine rivers.

Great Britain secured the territory in 1763 as a result of its victory over France in the Seven Years' War (also known as the French and Indian War; 1754–1763); the territory at the time included Rupert's Land, which incorporated the entire Hudson Bay watershed. Most rivers and water in Manitoba eventually flow north, not south or east as is commonly assumed, and empty into Hudson Bay. The Hudson's Bay Archives is located within Winnipeg, Manitoba, and preserves the rich history of the fur trading. The founding of the first agricultural community and settlements in 1812 by Lord Selkirk, the Red River Colony north of the area which is now downtown Winnipeg, resulted in conflict between British colonists and the Métis; and between the fur trading companies supporting them, the Hudson's Bay Company, and the North West Company. Twenty colonists, including the governor, and one Métis were killed in the Battle of Seven Oaks in 1816.

Lake Manitoba was named by the Cree, Ojibway, and Assiniboine before the land area to the south was named. The lake was named after the word Manitou, meaning spirit, but there is some mystery about the exact original words and their meanings. Thomas Spence was the first to suggest that a Republic of Manitobah be formed just south of Lake Manitoba. Louis Riel and others made a similar suggestion some years later.

== Confederation and the late 19th century ==
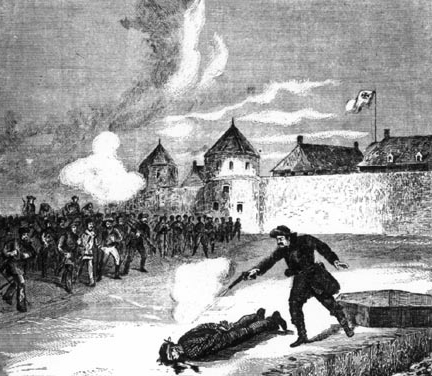
Depiction of Thomas Scott's execution at Fort Garry in March 1870, during the Red River Rebellion.

Rupert's Land was ceded to Canada in 1870 and incorporated as a part of the North-West Territories. The Métis of the Red River valley, seeing their concerns ignored by the new authority, launched the Red River Rebellion under Louis Riel, and established a provisional government that named the area as Manitoba. Negotiations between the provisional government and the Canadian government resulted in the passage of the Manitoba Act which created the Province of Manitoba and provided for its entry into Confederation in 1870. Louis Riel was pursued by British army officer Garnet Wolseley because of the rebellion, and Riel fled into exile.

=== Late 19th century ===
The new provincial government was controlled by Anglo Canadians. The agreement for the establishment of the Province had included guarantees that the Métis would receive grants of land and that their existing unofficial landholdings would be recognized. These guarantees were largely ignored. Instead, land went to Anglo settlers now coming in from Ontario. Facing this discrimination, the Métis moved in large numbers to what would become Saskatchewan and Alberta.

The original province of Manitoba was a square 1/18 of its current size, and was known as the "postage stamp province". It was bounded by the 49th parallel (US border) at the south, 96° longitude at the east, 99° longitude at the west, and 50° 30' at the north. Its borders were expanded in 1881, taking land from the North-West Territories and the District of Keewatin, but Ontario claimed a large portion of the Keewatin land; the disputed portion was awarded to Ontario in 1889. Manitoba grew to its current size in 1912, absorbing land from the Northwest Territories to reach 60°N, uniform with the northern reach of its western neighbours Saskatchewan, Alberta, and British Columbia.

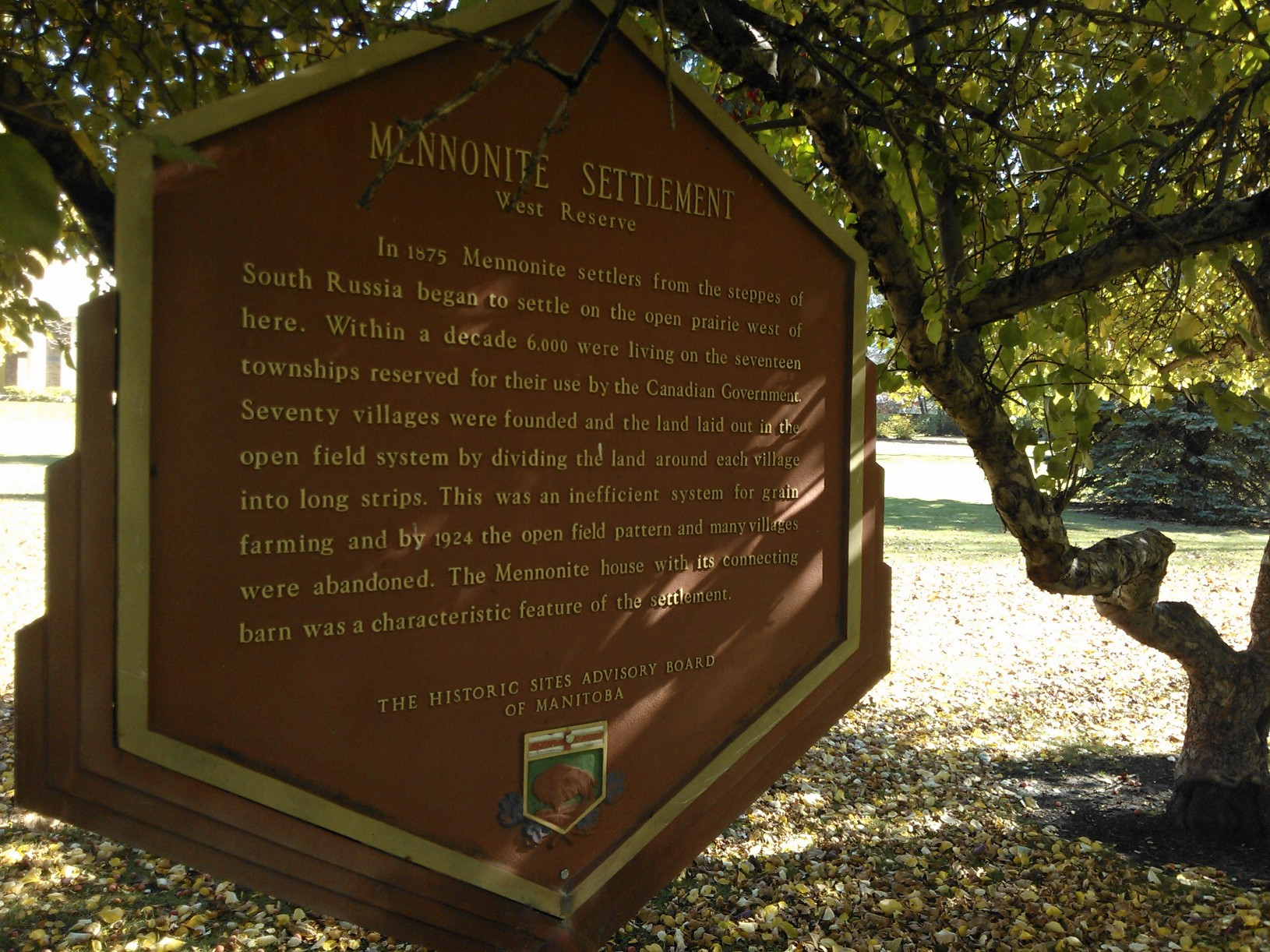
A plaque commemorating the settlement of the West Reserve by Russian Mennonites during the 1870s

In 1874 and 1876, two plots of land in southern Manitoba, the East Reserve and West Reserve, were set aside for Russian Mennonite settlement. In the years that followed, thousands of Mennonites immigrated to the area, then representing a significant percentage of the province's population. In 1875, a group of Icelandic immigrants settled in Gimli, on the west shore of Lake Winnipeg, founding the community of New Iceland. This was the largest settlement of Icelanders outside of that country.

Numbered Treaties were signed in the late 19th century with the chiefs of various First Nations that lived in the area. These treaties made specific promises of land for every family. As a result, a reserve system was established under the jurisdiction of the Government of Canada. The prescribed amount of land promised to the native peoples was not always given; this led to efforts by aboriginal groups to assert rights to the land through aboriginal land claims, many of which are still ongoing.

==== Manitoba Schools Question ====
The Manitoba Schools Question showed the deep divergence of cultural values in the territory and became an issue of national importance. The Catholic Franco-Manitobains had been guaranteed a state-supported separate school system in the original constitution of Manitoba, such that their children would be taught in French. However, a grassroots political movement among English Protestants from 1888 to 1890 demanded the end of French schools. In 1890, the Manitoba legislature passed a law removing funding for French Catholic schools. The French Catholic minority asked the federal government for support; however, the Orange Order and other anti-Catholic forces mobilized nationwide to oppose them.

The federal Conservatives proposed remedial legislation to override Manitoba, but they were blocked by the Liberals, led by Wilfrid Laurier, who opposed the remedial legislation because of his belief in provincial rights. The Manitoba Schools issue became an issue in the 1896 Canadian federal election, where it worked against the Conservatives and helped elect the Liberals. As Prime Minister, Laurier implemented a compromise stating that Catholics in Manitoba could have their own religious instruction for 30 minutes at the end of the day if there were enough students to warrant it, implemented on a school-by-school basis.

== 20th century ==
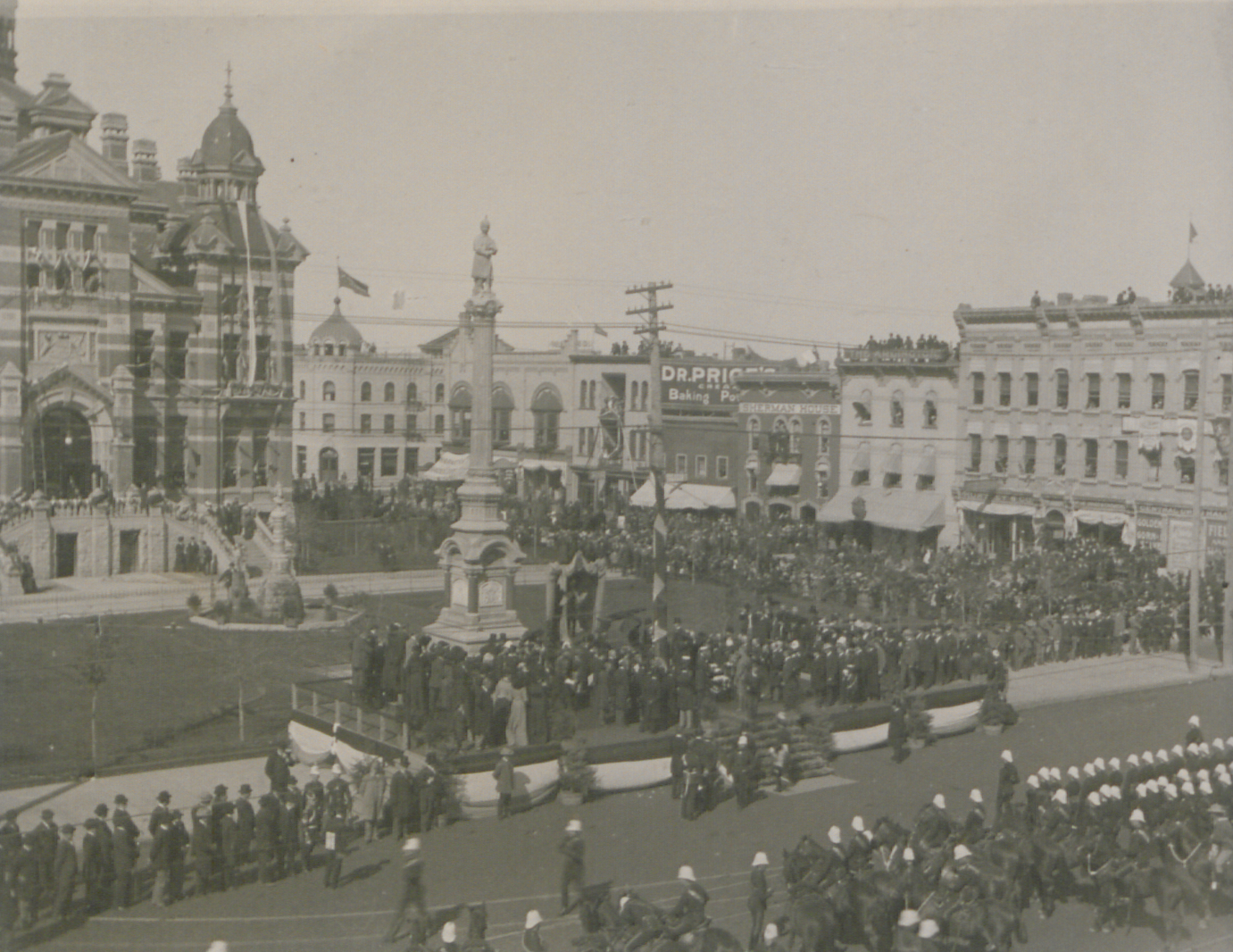
Crowds gather outside Winnipeg City Hall during the Duke of Cornwall and York's royal tour of Canada, 1901

By the early 20th century, Winnipeg had emerged as the third-largest city in Canada. This boomtown grew quickly from the late 19th century to the early 20th century. There was a lot of outside investors, immigration, railways, trains, and business was booming. Even today, one can see the many old mansions and estates that belonged to Winnipeg's ever growing wealthy class. When the Manitoba Legislature was built, it was expected that Manitoba would have a population of 3 million quite soon. Just around the time of the First World War, the quickly growing city began to cool down as the large amounts of money were no longer invested to the same degree as before the war. Winnipeg eventually fell behind in growth when other major cities in Canada began to boom ahead, such as Calgary today.

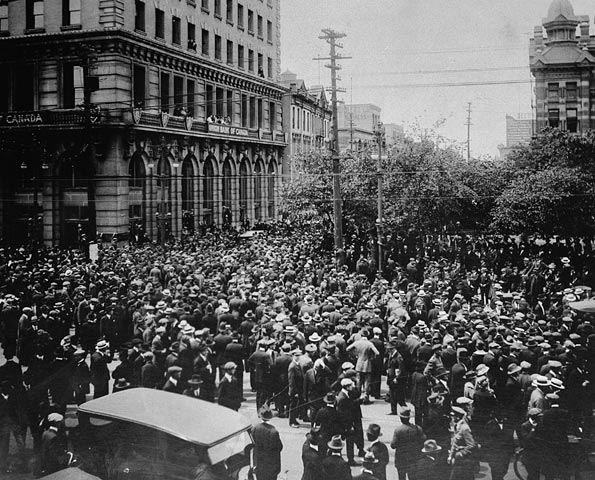
Crowds gather outside city Hall during the Winnipeg General Strike in 1919

In the 1917 election in the midst of the conscription crisis, the Liberals were split in half and the new Union party carried all but one seat. After the First World War ended, severe discontent among farmers (over wheat prices) and union members (over wage rates) resulted in an upsurge of radicalism, coupled with a polarization over the rise of Bolshevism in Russia. The most dramatic episode was the Winnipeg General Strike of 1919 which shut down most activity for six weeks, starting May 15. The strike collapsed on June 25, 1919, as the workers were gradually returning to their jobs and the Central Strike Committee decided to end the strike. As historian W. L. Morton has explained:

The strike, then, began with two immediate aims and two subsidiary but increasingly important aspects. One aim was the redress of legitimate grievances with respect to wages and collective bargaining; the other was the trial of a new instrument of economic action, the general strike, the purpose of which was to put pressure on the employers involved in the dispute through the general public. The first subsidiary aspect was that the general strike, however, might be a prelude to the seizure of power in the community by Labour, and both the utterances and the policies of the O.B.U. leaders pointed in that direction. The second subsidiary aspect was that, as a struggle for leadership in the Labour movement was being waged as the strike began, it was not made clear which object, the legitimate and limited one, or the revolutionary and general one, was the true purpose of the strike. It is now apparent that the majority of both strikers and strike leaders were concerned only to win the strike. The general public at large, however, subjected to the sudden coercion of the general strike, was only too likely to decide that a revolutionary seizure of power was in view.

In the aftermath, eight leaders went on trial, and most were convicted on charges of seditious conspiracy, illegal combinations, and seditious libel; four were aliens who were deported under the Canadian Immigration Act. Organized labour in Manitoba was weakened and divided as a result.

Meanwhile, the farmers of the province were patiently organizing the United Farmers of Manitoba (UFM), which contested the 1920 provincial legislative elections. The result of the 1920 election was that no party had a majority in the legislature and no government could be formed. New elections were held in 1922 to resolve the crisis. The UFM won decisively, gaining 30 of 57 seats. 7 Liberals, 6 Conservatives, 6 Labourites, and 8 Independents were also returned.

=== Access to Hudson Bay ===
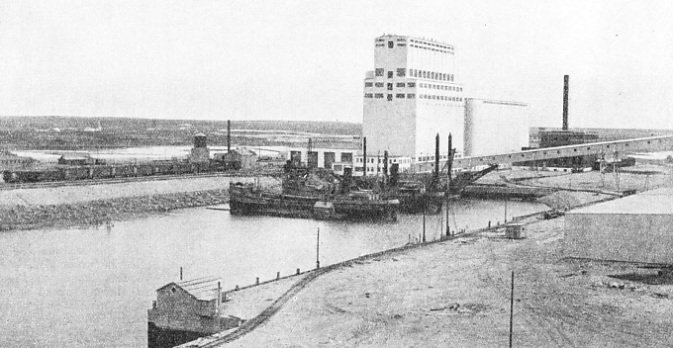
The Port of Churchill in 1933. Established in 1931, it allowed grain shipments from Manitoba farmers to be shipped out from within the province.

Frustration with shipping grain through eastern ports, Manitoba farmers lobbied for their own grain port on Hudson Bay which led the creation of the Hudson Bay Railway which was built in stages north from The Pas after a railway bridge was constructed over the Saskatchewan River in 1910–1911 by the Canadian Northern Railway (CNoR). After initial surveys considered both the ports of Churchill and Port Nelson, it was decided to proceed to Port Nelson in 1912. Construction began at Port Nelson and the new Canadian research ship CSS Acadia was sent to chart the port and shipping routes into the Bay. However harbour construction at Port Nelson ran into engineering and costs problems and was abandoned during the First World War.

Following the CNoR bankruptcy in 1918 and the creation of the Canadian National Railways (CNR), the federal government undertook to complete the Hudson Bay Railway; although this time building a railway line towards Churchill. CSS Acadia was sent to survey for a port and railway construction resumed. Political and financing difficulties as well as engineering challenges due to the large amount of muskeg and frequent rock outcrops on the Canadian Shield delayed the completion of the railway and port but it was completed and opened to shipping in 1929.

=== Great Depression and the Second World War ===
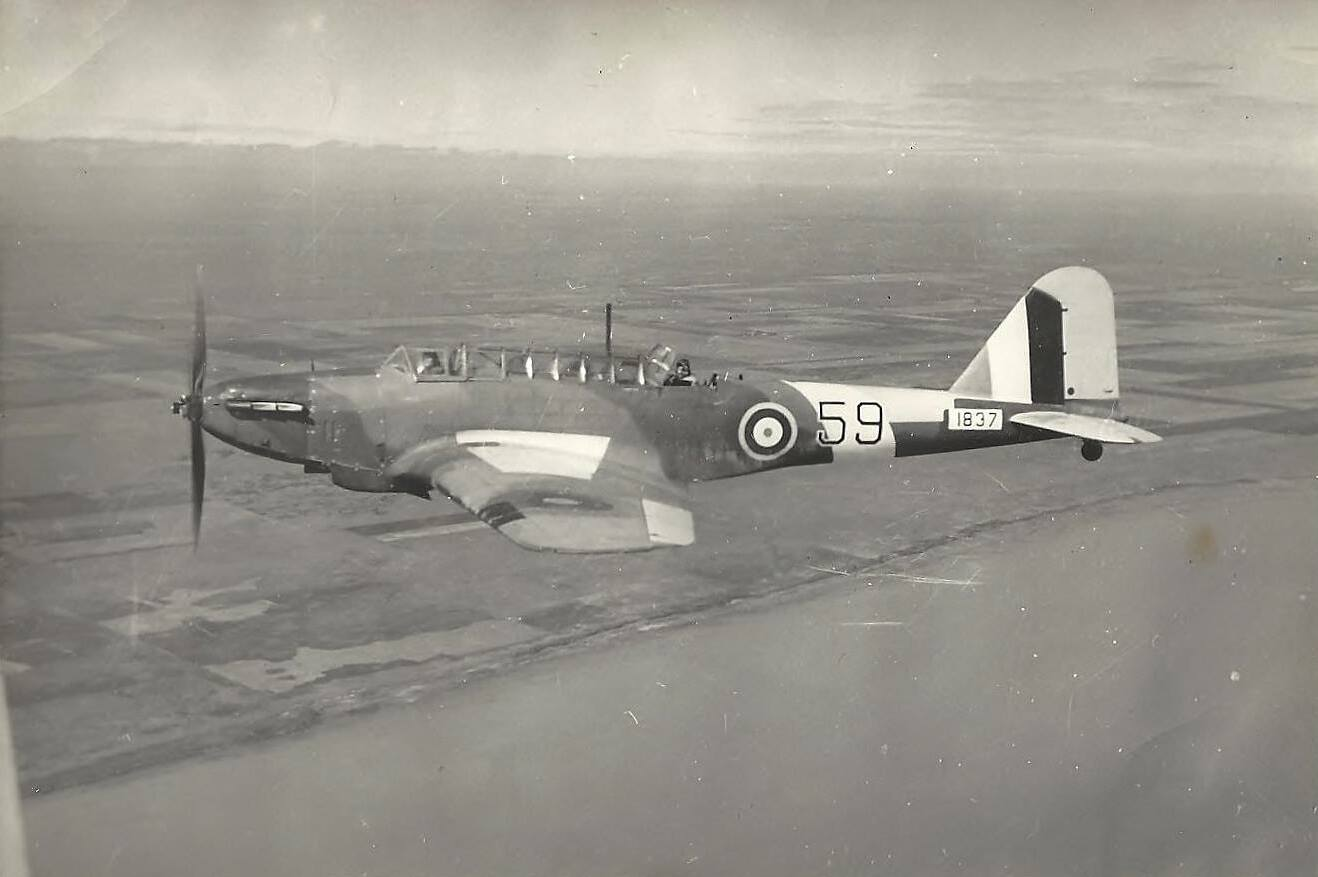
RCAF pilots with the British Commonwealth Air Training Plan conduct flight training over Lake Manitoba during World War II.

The Great Depression (1929–c.1939) hit especially hard in Western Canada, including Manitoba. The collapse of the world market combined with a steep drop in agricultural production due to drought led to economic diversification, moving away from a reliance on wheat production. The Manitoba Co-operative Commonwealth Federation, forerunner to the New Democratic Party of Manitoba (NDP), was founded in 1932.

Canada entered the Second World War in 1939. Winnipeg was one of the major commands for the British Commonwealth Air Training Plan to train fighter pilots, and there were air training schools throughout Manitoba. Several Manitoba-based regiments were deployed overseas, including Princess Patricia's Canadian Light Infantry. In an effort to raise money for the war effort, the Victory Loan campaign organised "If Day" in 1942. The event featured a simulated Nazi invasion and occupation of Manitoba, and eventually raised over C$65 million.

=== Latter 20th century ===
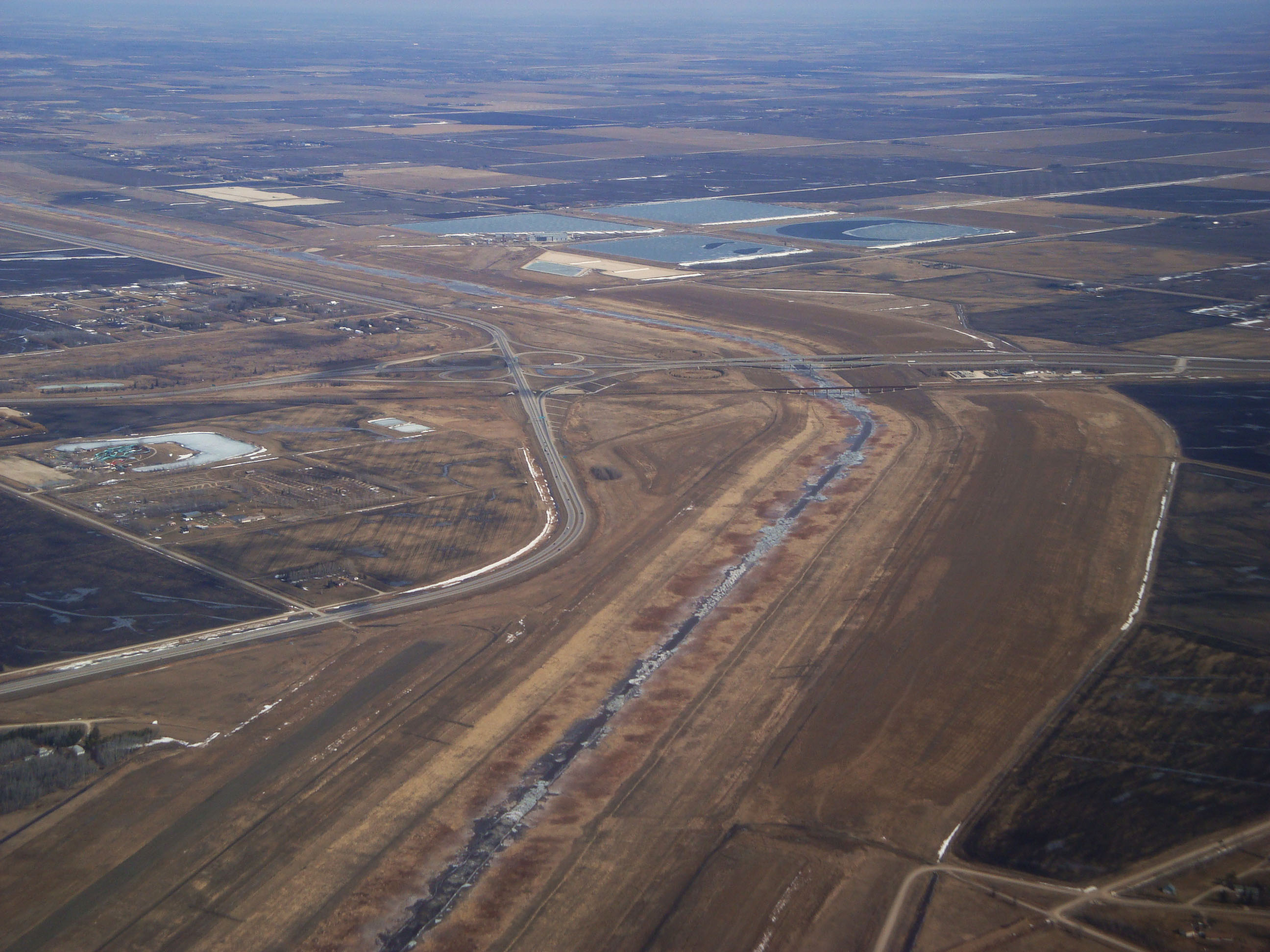
Aerial view of the Red River Floodway in 2010. The floodway was built in order to reduce future damages from flooding.

Winnipeg was inundated during the 1950 Red River Flood and had to be partially evacuated. In that year, the Red River reached its highest level since 1861 and flooded most of the Red River Valley. The damage caused by the flood led then-Premier Duff Roblin to advocate for the construction of the Red River Floodway; it was completed in 1968 after six years of excavation. Permanent dikes were erected in eight towns south of Winnipeg, and clay dikes and diversion dams were built in the Winnipeg area.

The province celebrated in 1970 the centennial of its entry into Confederation. Princess Anne and Prince Charles, Prince of Wales, presided over the official celebrations.

In 1990, Prime Minister Brian Mulroney attempted to pass the Meech Lake Accord, a series of constitutional amendments to persuade Quebec to endorse the Canada Act 1982. Unanimous support in the legislature was needed to bypass public consultation. Manitoba politician Elijah Harper, a Cree, opposed because he did not believe First Nations had been adequately involved in the Accord's process, and thus the Accord failed.

In 1997, the "Flood of the Century" caused over C$400 million in damages in Manitoba, but the floodway prevented Winnipeg from flooding.

== 21st century ==
Manitoba voters are divided along numerous cleavages, such as rural and urban, north and south, British (WASP) and ethnic, and businessmen/ professionals/ farmers/ workers. The New Democratic Party (NDP) has a base among the ethnically diverse and low-income communities of Northern Manitoba and north Winnipeg. The base for the Progressive Conservatives (PCs) is in the wealthier, southern regions of the province and Winnipeg. Wesley argues that the key to success lies in designing moderate platforms that avoid extremes, emphasize progress, and pursue a middle-of-the-road path. Leading politicians including Duff Roblin, Edward Schreyer, and Gary Doer have reached across the social, geographical and cultural divisions in Manitoba to stake their claim to be the "progressive centre" and thereby gain control of the middle ground of Manitoba party politics.

== See also ==
- History of Winnipeg
  - Timeline of Winnipeg history
- Timeline of Manitoba history
- List of historic places in Manitoba
- Archives of Manitoba
- Natural Resources Acts
- Canadian Prairies

== Bibliography ==
Series

- Transactions of the Manitoba Historical Society. Manitoba Historical Society. 1879–1979. — series of published lectures by the MHS on various topics.
- Manitoba History (journal). Manitoba Historical Society. 1980–2019. ISSN 0226-5044. — a journal featuring peer-reviewed scholarly, written works relating to the social, economic, political, intellectual, and cultural history of Manitoba and the Canadian West.
- Manitoba Pageant (magazine). Manitoba Historical Society. 1956–1979.
- Prairie History (journal). ISSN 2562-8976 (print) and 2562-8984 (online) — a journal featuring scholarly articles, popular history, book reviews, and other specialty pieces.

=== Reference works ===
- Bumsted, J. M. 1999. Dictionary of Manitoba Biography. Winnipeg: Univ. of Manitoba Press. ISBN 0887552641. Google Books.
- Bumsted, J. M., Ken S. Coates, and Peter McLintock. 2023 February 24. "Manitoba." Encyclopedia Britannica.
- "Manitoba", The Canadian Encyclopedia. Historica Canada. — a very good starting point
  - The Canadian Encyclopedia (2008)
- The Dictionary of Canadian Biography (1966–2006) — scholarly biographies of every important person in Canadian history
  - "From the Red River Settlement to Manitoba (1812–70)"
- Representative Men of Manitoba: History in Portraiture. Winnipeg: Tribune Publishing Company. 1902 [2007]. Google Books.

=== Surveys and general history ===
- Adams, Christopher. 2008. Politics in Manitoba: Parties, Leaders, and Voters.
- Begg, Alexander. 1887. The Creation of Manitoba: Or a History of the Red River Troubles. Toronto: A. H. Hovey. Google Books.
- Bumsted, J. M. 2003. Trials and Tribulations: The Emergence of Manitoba 1821–1870.
- Chafe, J. W. 1973. Extraordinary Tales from Manitoba History.
- Coates, Kenneth. 1999. Manitoba: Province & People.
- Conway, John Frederick. 2005. The West: The History of a Region in Confederation (3rd ed.). Lorimer.
- Friesen, Gerald. 1987. The Canadian Prairies: A History (2nd ed.)
- ——. 1996. River Road: Essays on Manitoba and Prairie History. Winnipeg: Univ. of Manitoba Press. ISBN 0887550339. Google Books.
- Morton, W.L. 1957 [1970]. Manitoba: A History. Toronto: University of Toronto Press. ISBN 0-8020-6070-6 — the standard scholarly history;
- Whitcomb, Ed. 1982. A Short History of Manitoba. Stittsville, ON: Canada's Wings. ISBN 0-920002-15-3.

=== Social, cultural, and intellectual history ===
- Artibise, Alan F. J. 1975. Winnipeg: A Social History of Urban Growth, 1874-1914. McGill-Queen's Press. ISBN 0773502025. Google Books.
- Bumsted, J. M. 2001. University of Manitoba: An Illustrated History. Winnipeg: Univ. of Manitoba Press. ISBN 9780887552687. Google Books.
- Friesen, J. 1963. "Expansion of Settlement in Manitoba, 1870–1900." In MHS Transactions, Series 3, Number 20, 1963–64. Manitoba Historical Society.
- Kinnear, Mary. 1987. First Days, Fighting Days: Women in Manitoba History.
- ——. 1999. A Female Economy: Women's Work in a Prairie Province, 1870–1970.
- Kinnear, Mary, and Vera Fast. 1987. Planting the Garden: An Annotated Archival Bibliography of the History of Women in Manitoba. Univ. of Manitoba Press. ISBN 0887550967. Google Books.
- Weir, Thomas R. "Settlement in Southwest Manitoba, 1870–1891." In MHS Transactions, Series 3, Number 17, 1960–61. Manitoba Historical Society.

=== Economic, labour, and political history ===
- Bennett, John W. and Seena B. Kohl. 1995. Settling the Canadian-American West, 1890–1915: Pioneer Adaptation and Community Building. An Anthropological History. University of Nebraska Press. ISBN 0803212542. Google Books.
- Bercuson, David J. 1990. Confrontation at Winnipeg: Labour, Industrial Relations, and the General Strike. McGill-Queen's University Press. ISBN 0-7735-0794-9.
- Blanchard, Jim. 2005. Winnipeg 1912. Winnipeg: Univ. of Manitoba Press, 2005. ISBN 0887559883. Google Books.
- ——. 2021. Thinking Big: A History of the Winnipeg Business Community to the Second World War. Great Plains Publications. ISBN 1773370588.
- Brawn, Dale. 2006. The Court of Queen's Bench of Manitoba, 1870-1950: A Biographical History. University of Toronto Press. ISBN 080209225X. Google Books.
- Carr, Ian, and Robert E. Beamish. 1999. Manitoba Medicine: A Brief History. Winnipeg: Univ. of Manitoba Press. ISBN 9780887553424 and ISBN 0887556604. Google Books.
- Creighton, Donald G. "John A. Macdonald, Confederation and the Canadian West." In MHS Transactions, Series 3, Number 23, 1966–67. Manitoba Historical Society. — argues that multiculturalism was not part of the foundation of the province.
- Danysk, Cecilia. 1995. Hired Hands: Labour and the Development of Prairie Agriculture, 1880–1930. 231 pp.
- Ellis, J.H. 1971. The Ministry of Agriculture in Manitoba, 1870–1970.
- Gagnon, Erica. 2022 January 28. "Settling the West: Immigration to the Prairies from 1867 to 1914." Canadian Museum of Immigration at Pier 21.
- Norrie, K. H. 1975 June. "The Rate of Settlement of the Canadian Prairies, 1870–1911." Journal of Economic History 35(2):410–427. JSTOR 2119414.
- Orlikow, Lionel. "The Reform Movement in Manitoba, 1910–1915." In MHS Transactions, Series 3, Number 16, 1959–60. Manitoba Historical Society.
- Silver, Jim, and Jeremy Hull. 1991. The Political Economy of Manitoba.
- Sylvester, Kenneth. 2001. The Limits of Rural Capitalism: Family, Culture, and Markets in Montcalm, Manitoba, 1870–1940.
- Wiseman, Nelson. 1983. Social Democracy in Manitoba: A History of the CCF/NDP. Winnipeg: Univ. of Manitoba Press. ISBN 978-0-88755-118-5. Google Books.

=== Religion, ethnicity, and First Nations ===
- Chiel, Arthur A. 1961. The Jews in Manitoba: A Social History. University of Toronto Press. Google Books.
- Clark, Lovell (ed.). 1968. The Manitoba School Question: majority rule or minority rights?. Copp Clark.
- Emery, George. 2001. The Methodist Church on the Prairies, 1896–1914. McGill-Queen's U. Press. 259 pp.
- Ewanchuk, Michael. 1981. Pioneer Profiles: Ukrainian Settlers in Manitoba. ISBN 0-9690768-4-3.
- Logan, Tricia. 2020 May 5. "Métis Experiences at Residential School." The Canadian Encyclopedia. Historica Canada.
- McLauchlin Kenneth. 1986. "Riding The Protestant Horse: The Manitoba School Question and Canadian Politics, 1890–1896." Historical Studies 1986(53):39–52.
- Marnoch, James. 1996. Western Witness: The Presbyterians in the Area of Synod of Manitoba.
- Miller, J. R. 1973 December. "D'Alton McCarthy, Equal Rights, and the Origins of the Manitoba School Question." Canadian Historical Review 54(4):369–92.
- Milloy, John S. 1990. "The Plains Cree: Trade, Diplomacy, and War, 1790 to 1870." Manitoba Studies in Native History.
- Mukhtar, Ismael Ibrahim. 2021. Manitoba Muslims: A History of Resilience and Growth. FriesenPress. ISBN 1525598619. Google Books.
- Peters, Evelyn, Matthew Stock, and Adrian Werner. 2018. Rooster Town: The History of an Urban Métis Community, 1901–1961. Univ. of Manitoba Press. ISBN 0887555667.
- Petryshyn, Jaroslav. 1985. Peasants in the Promised Land: Canada and the Ukrainians, 1891–1914.
- Sprague, D.N. 1988. Canada and the Métis, 1869–1885. Wilfrid Laurier University Press. Google Books.
- Stanley, George F. G. The birth of western Canada: A history of the Riel Rebellions (1936), a major scholarly study online
- Swyripa, Frances. 2010. Storied Landscapes: Ethno-Religious Identity and the Canadian Prairies. Winnipeg: U. of Manitoba Press. 296 pp. ISBN 978-0-88755-191-8
- Ward, Donald B. 1995. The People: A Historical Guide to the First Nations of Alberta, Saskatchewan, and Manitoba.
- Yuzyk, Paul. 1953. The Ukrainians in Manitoba: A Social History.

=== Historiography ===
- Blanchard, Jim. A Thousand Miles of Prairie: The Manitoba Historical Society and the History of Western Canada (University of Manitoba Press, 2002)
- Bumsted, J. M. 1981. "The Quest for a Usable Founder: Lord Selkirk and Manitoba Historians, 1856–1923," Manitoba History, June 1981(2):2–7
- Calder, Alison, and Wardhaugh, Robert, ed. 2005. History, Literature, and the Writing of the Canadian Prairies. Winnipeg: U. of Manitoba Press. 310 pp.
- Friesen, Gerald, and Barry Potyondi. 1981. A Guide to the Study of Manitoba Local History. Winnipeg: Univ. of Manitoba Press. ISBN 9780887550249. Google Books.
- Loewen, Royden (1999). "On the Margin or in the Lead: Canadian Prairie Historiography". Agricultural History. 73 (1): 27–45. Archived from the original on October 14, 2012 – via HighBeam Research.
