= Schmidt decision =

Schmidt v Calgary Board of Education (Alberta Supreme Court, Appellate Division, Sinclair, Clement and Moir, JJ.A. October 26, 1976) is the basis for the legal requirement in Alberta that, where a separate school jurisdiction exists, members of the minority faith that established the separate school jurisdiction must be considered and treated as residents, electors, and ratepayers of the separate school jurisdiction. Approximately 40 percent of the land area of Alberta is covered by separate school jurisdiction.

This decision was handed down prior to the enactment of the Charter of Rights and Freedoms in 1982, and it has not been appealed to the Supreme Court of Canada so it is not ultimately determinative of the issue.

In addition, as the system is based on the School Ordinance of the North-West Territories (1901), it only applies to schools in Alberta and Saskatchewan.

== Legal significance ==
Schmidt is a civil rights case, pre-Canadian Charter of Rights and Freedoms. The key question is whether there was an illegal expression of discrimination on the basis of religious beliefs, contrary to the Alberta Individual Rights Protection Act, 1972 (Individual's Rights Protection Act, 1972 (Alta.), c.2, s.3(b) - School Act, R.S.A. 1970, c. 329, ss. 53,142, 143).

It is also a constitutional law case, relating to the provisions that enshrine the rights of those who choose to establish and operate separate schools in Alberta. (British North America Act, 1867, s. 93 - Alberta Act, 1905 (Can.), c.3, s. 17 - Individual's Rights Protection Act, 1972 (Alta.), c. 2, ss.1(2), 3(b))

== History ==
The applicant, Mr. Schmidt, was Roman Catholic, and the father of two school-aged children. The parents had earlier lived in Ontario, where they had enrolled their daughters in a public school, although a Roman Catholic school was available to them. In Ontario, members of the minority faith have the option of being residents, electors, and ratepayers of the public school system.

Mr. Schmidt's employer, Air Canada, transferred him to Calgary, where he sought to enroll his children in the public school system as he had done in Ontario. While visiting a local public elementary school, a teacher asked about his religion. Mr. Schmidt answered that he was Catholic. After this encounter, staff of the Calgary Board of Education advised Mr. Schmidt that he must either pay a non-resident tuition fee for each child or sign a paper saying that he was not a Roman Catholic.

Mr. Schmidt paid the fee to enroll his children at the public school but at the same time lodged a complaint with the Alberta Human Rights Commission. Mr. Schmidt, although a Roman Catholic, supported public school education and preferred to have his daughters educated in a public school.

A Board of Inquiry, organized pursuant to the Individual Rights Protection Act, 1972 (Alberta), found against him and upheld the proposition that, in Alberta, wherever a separate school jurisdiction exists, members of the minority faith that established the separate school jurisdiction must be considered and treated as residents, electors, and ratepayers of the separate school jurisdiction. The Board of Inquiry concluded that Mr. Schmidt would have to enroll his children with the Calgary Roman Catholic Separate School District and ask that district to enter into a tuition agreement with the Calgary Board of Education so that it (CBE) would enroll his child.

Mr. Schmidt appealed the decision of the Board of Inquiry, by commencing an action before the Court of Queen's Bench, Alberta. The Court of Queen's Bench found in his favour, overturning the decision of the Board of Inquiry.

The Calgary Board of Education appealed, and the decision of the Court of Queen's Bench was overturned on appeal to the Alberta Supreme Court, Appellate Division.

== Main findings ==
Mr. Justice Moir, speaking for the Alberta Supreme Court, Appellate Division (now the Alberta Court of Appeal), made several findings. Primary among these are:

- Once a religious minority has established their own school jurisdiction, all members of that faith become members and are excluded from the public jurisdiction. The law makes it clear that there "is no machinery for getting out so long as you are of the religious faith of the minority who have acted to establish the separate school district." Furthermore, "[t]he majority of the minority have the right to compel the entire minority to join the separate school division."

- Paying taxes to a public jurisdiction does not make an individual a resident of that jurisdiction if there exists separate school jurisdiction in which they should be a resident. Justice Moir states, "The fact that Schmidt is paying his taxes to the public school board must be by error in law as I can find no authority for it. In my opinion it cannot effect Schmidt's residence."

- School jurisdictions are permitted to ask the faith of those parents who enroll their children in the jurisdiction. Justice Moir states, "As soon as the minority opted out of the public school system (be it Protestant or Catholic) it was necessary to ask 'Are you a Roman Catholic or a Protestant?'" He continues, "In order to have two separate school systems it is necessary to have a legislative method of dividing or separating the minority from the majority." He offers the following example: "it is essential in legislation dealing with 'Indians' that Parliament be able to define the class to which the legislation is to apply. Likewise if separate schools are to be permitted a mechanism for separating the group had to be found."

- Minority faiths (meaning Roman Catholics and Protestants) have guaranteed rights to separate school jurisdictions that cannot be superseded by any act of the Legislative Assembly of Alberta. Justice Moir states, "The existence of two systems is guaranteed to the minority.... This is the situation as it was in 1901, and in 1905 and the way it is in Calgary today. In my opinion there is no legislative authority in Alberta to abolish that scheme..." He continues, "It is elementary to say that the provisions of a statute of Alberta are incapable of affecting the validity of the British North America Act, 1867, or of the Alberta Act. The scheme having been approved of by the Imperial Parliament, the Parliament of Canada, as well by the Legislature of Alberta, is binding. In my opinion it cannot be held inoperative by reason of the Individual Rights Protection Act."
