= Timeline of Manitoba history =

Most of the following timelines for Manitoba's history is taken from either the Manitoba Historical Society, or from the Heritage Manitoba and the Gimli Municipal Heritage Advisory Committee, as adapted from a three-volume history of Manitoba published in 1993 titled Manitoba: 125.

== Pre-Confederation ==
Pre-historic

- 11,500 B.C. — Clovis people cross northern Asia to North America along the Bering land bridge.
- 5,000 to 6,000 B.C. — The last 15,000 year period of glaciations ends.
- c. 1285 — A large meeting of First Nations peoples at The Forks leads to a peace treaty covering lands across most of western Canada.

Early European arrival

- August 3, 1610 — Henry Hudson sails the Discoverie into what is now Hudson Bay.
- August 15, 1616 — Thomas Button discovers and names the Nelson River.
- September 5, 1619 — Denmark's Jens Munk sails into what is now Churchill Harbour.
- September 29, 1668 — Medard Chouart, Sieur de Groseilliers, aboard the Nonsuch, arrive at Rupert River in Hudson Bay.
- May 2, 1670 — King Charles II issues a Charter to Prince Rupert and the Company of Adventurers of England Trading into Hudson's Bay thereby creating Rupert's Land. The Charter included "all territory draining into the rivers flowing into Hudson Bay."
- June 12, 1690 — Henry Kelsey undertakes an expedition to the country of the Assiniboines, and becomes the first European man to see the prairies.
- 1731 — Construction on Fort Prince of Wales begins.
- September 24, 1738 — Pierre Gaultiere de Varennes, Sieur de La Verendrye is the first European man to see the future site of Winnipeg. He builds Fort Rouge at the forks of the Red and Assiniboine Rivers.
- 1741 — Fort Dauphin is founded by eldest surviving son of La Verendrye.

Early 19th century

- 1809 — The North West Company (NWC) builds Fort Gibraltar at a point northwest of the junction of the Red and Assiniboine Rivers.
- September 4, 1812 — Near the Red River, Miles Macdonnell proclaimed to the local inhabitants Lord Selkirk's ownership of the 185,000 km^{2} (71,000 sq mi) that constitute Assiniboia.
- January 8, 1814 — Macdonnell issues the "Pemmican Proclamation," prohibiting the export of food beyond Selkirk's territory.
- October 21, 1814 — Macdonnell orders the Nor'Westers (employees of the NWC) to quit their posts throughout Assiniboia.
- June 15, 1815 — Nor'Westers Duncan Cameron convinced 140 colonists to abandon the settlement and journey to Upper Canada.
- June 19, 1816 — The Battle of Seven Oaks takes place. Governor Robert Semple, 20 settlers, and one Métis were killed.
- Spring 1817 — Lord Selkirk's military force reaches Red River and recaptures Fort Douglas.
- Summer 16, 1818 — Fathers Norbert Provencher and Sévère-Joseph-Nicolas Dumoulin arrive at Red River.
- September 1818 — The first school at Red River is established by Provencher and Dumoulin in what would later become St. Boniface.
- April 18, 1822 — Fort Gibraltar renamed Fort Garry in honour of Nicholas Garry.
- June 10, 1821 — St. John's, the first Anglican Church, is consecrated.
- April 28, 1826 — Ice on the Red River begins breaking up, marking the start of the greatest recorded flood in Manitoba history.
- 1834 – 33 years after selling Assiniboia to Lord Selkirk, Hudson's Bay Company re-purchases the vast territory from the Selkirk estate.
- 1835 — First meeting of reorganized Council of Assiniboia.
- 1835–36 — The new Fort Garry, made of stone, is under construction near the junction of Red and Assiniboine Rivers.
- June 1837 — The second St. Boniface Cathedral, featuring twin turrets, is built.
- 1844 — The Grey Nuns arrive at Red River from Montreal.

Late 19th century

- 1851 — William Cockran begins the settlement at Portage la Prairie.
- June 10, 1859 — The first steamboat on the Red River, the Anson Northup arrived at the Red River settlement.
- December 28, 1859 — The first edition of the Nor'Wester, Manitoba's first newspaper, is published at Red River.
- February 21, 1861 — The second St. Boniface Cathedral is destroyed by fire.
- 1867 — The British North America Act specifically mentions Canada's intention to acquire the Northwest.
- November 2, 1869 — Red River Rebellion: Armed Métis turn back Canadian appointed Lieutenant Governor William McDougall, and Louis Riel and his men seize Fort Garry.
- November 27, 1869 — A Provisional Government, incorporating most elements of Red River Colony, is formed.
- December 7, 1869 — Louis Riel arrested 56 people at Dr. Schultz's store.
- December 27, 1869 — Louis Riel elected President of the Provisional Government.
- January 19, 1870 — Canadian negotiator Donald A. Smith addressed a crowd of over 1,000 in Fort Garry, regarding the Canadian Government's intentions of the Northwest.
- March 4, 1870 — Thomas Scott is executed by order of Louis Riel.
- May 12, 1870 — The Manitoba Act, outlining the province's entry into Confederation, is assented, creating the new province of Manitoba.

== Early Post-Confederation ==
- July 15, 1870 — Province of Manitoba officially admitted into Confederation, with Winnipeg becoming capital of both Manitoba and the Northwest Territories.
- August 1870 — The Red River Expedition led by Col. Garnet J. Wolseley, arrived at Fort Garry and took possession of the fort. Riel fled to the United States. Wolseley asked HBC Commissioner Donald A. Smith to administer the government pending the arrival of the lieutenant-governor.
- September 2, 1870 — Lieutenant-Governor A.G. Archibald arrived at Fort Garry.
- December 30, 1870 — First election held for the province's Legislative Assembly.
- March 15, 1817 — First session of the first Legislature held in a house bought from A.G.B. Bannatyne. Twenty-eight members were present.
- 1871 — Grey Nuns open the first St. Boniface Hospital with four beds.
- May 3, 1871 — First Manitoba Public School Act.
- August 3, 1871 — Lieutenant-Governor Archibald and native leaders gathered at Lower Fort Garry to sign Treaty 1. Treaty 2 was signed August 21 at Manitoba House.
- October 5, 1871 — Fenians from the United States entered Manitoba and seized the HBC post at Pembina. Later they were captured by a corps of United States troops whom Lieutenant-Governor Archibald had given permission to cross the border.
- November 9, 1872 — First edition of the Manitoba Free Press appeared.
- 1873 — The province's first rural municipality, Springfield and Sunnyside, is incorporated.
- November 8, 1873 — City of Winnipeg incorporated, with four wards and 12 aldermen.
- July 31, 1874 — First Russian Mennonites arrived at Winnipeg on the steamer International.
- October 10, 1874 — Ambroise Lepine found guilty of aiding Riel in the murder of Thomas Scott and sentenced to hang on January 29, 1875. His sentence was later commuted to two years' imprisonment.
- October 11, 1875 — First Icelandic immigrants arrived in Winnipeg.
- October 7, 1876 — Northwest Territories Act passes, separating them from Manitoba. Winnipeg would no longer be capital of the Territories.
- October 21, 1876 — First shipment of wheat from Manitoba to Ontario, some 857 bushels valued at $835.71.
- February 28, 1877 — Law Society of Manitoba incorporated. University of Manitoba chartered.
- October 10, 1877 — Manitoba's first railway locomotive, the Countess of Dufferin, arrived in St. Boniface via streamer.
- 1878 — John Norquay becomes Manitoba's first Metis Premier.
- November 2, 1878 — John McBeth, last member of the first group of Selkirk settlers, dies at Kildonan.
- December 24, 1878 — First freight by rail reached St. Boniface. Two days later, the first freight for export was shipped by rail from St. Boniface via steamer.
- March 21, 1881 — Manitoba Boundaries Act passed in Parliament, providing for an extension of the province's borders.
- December 11, 1883 — Standard time adopted throughout the province.
- August 11, 1884 — Boundary dispute between Manitoba and Ontario settled by a decision of the judicial committee of the Privy Council.
- March 17, 1885 — Louis Riel elected president of the Provisional Government in the Northwest Territories, launching the North-West Rebellion.
- May 9–12, 1885 — Battle of Batoche: Louis Riel's last stand, after which he was taken prisoner on May 15, and executed on November 16 at Regina.
- March 1890 — Denominational (separate) school system abolished in Manitoba.
- October, 1892 — First Ukrainians reached Winnipeg.

== 20th century ==
Pre-World War II

- 1906 — Manitoba enacted legislation for a government-run telephone system. By January 15, 1908, Manitoba Government Telephones was operating as the first such public utility in North America.
- May 10, 1910 — The steamer Victoria passed through the New St. Andrews Locks. The locks were formally opened July 15.
- February 26, 1912 — Manitoba's new boundaries announced, increasing its size to present-day borders.
- 1913 — First Boys and Girls Club in Canada is formed at Roland.
- May 12, 1915 — The Government of Rodmond Roblin resigned over the Legislative Buildings' scandal, and T.C. Norris becomes Premier.
- January 27, 1916 — Women's Suffrage Bill is adopted by the Manitoba Legislature, making Manitoba the first province to grant women the right to vote and hold provincial office.
- March 13, 1916 — Prohibition introduced and bars banished under the Manitoba Temperance Act.
- August 1916 — Compulsory Education Act came into effect.
- October 11, 1918 — Ban placed on all public gatherings due to the Spanish Influenza epidemic.
- April 5, 1919 — Greater Winnipeg Aqueduct completed, and soft water from Shoal Lake turned on in Winnipeg.
- May–June 1919 — Winnipeg General Strike
  - May 15, 1919 — Winnipeg General Strike began as street car workers walked off the job.
  - June 21, 1919 — Winnipeg General Strike culminated as Mounties charge a crowd of strikers and shots are fired. Two men die as a result of the struggle.
  - June 25, 1919 — Winnipeg General Strike leaders who have not been taken into custody vote to end the strike. Serviced restored throughout the city.
- November 21, 1919 — Golden Boy placed on the dome of the Legislative Building.
- June 29, 1920 — Edith Rogers became first women elected to Manitoba Legislature.
- June 1920 — Provincial government repealed prohibition and established the Liquor Control Commission.
- April 2, 1922 — Canada's first commercial radio station, CJCG, was introduced by the Free Press.
- March 1926 — Winnipeg's James Armstrong Richardson formed Western Canada Airways Incorporation.
- April 3, 1929 — Last spike driven on the Hudson Bay Railway at Churchill. By August 1931, the terminal elevator dock and other port facilities were in operation.
- October 4, 1929 — The value of stocks plummeted on North American stock exchanges, signalling the beginning of the Depression.
- June 15, 1930 — The Diamond Jubilee of Manitoba's entry into Confederation was celebrated.
- July 15, 1930 — Control over Manitoba's natural resources was transferred from the federal government to the province.
- September 1935 — Federal government created the new Canadian Wheat Board.
- September 10, 1939 — Canada declared war on Germany

1940s–1950s

- Spring 1942 — Manitoba Power Commissions began its rural electrification program.
- September 1943 — All wheat marketing in Western Canada was placed under the Canadian Wheat Board. Wheat futures trading ended on the Winnipeg Grain Exchange.
- May 7, 1945 — Manitobans celebrated V-E Day.
- 1946 — The federal government cancelled half of the province's Depression-era debt and paid a subsidy to Manitoba in return for it giving up the right to levy income and corporate taxes.
- April–May 1950 — 1950 Red River flood: Southern Manitoba was gripped by severe flooding, forcing thousands of evacuations and causing millions of dollars' worth of property damages.
- February 1951 — Manitoba's first commercial oil well was tapped in the Virden area.
- 1952 — Legislation passed allowing women to sit on juried in the Virden area.
- 1952 — Manitoba aboriginals were given the right to vote provincially.
- May 31, 1954 — Television broadcasting arrived in Manitoba when CBC Winnipeg signed on.
- February 1956 — A massive nickel discovery was made in the Moak Lake area, leading to the creation of the City of Thompson.
- 1956 — Stephen Juba, a Ukrainian-Canadian, became the first non-Anglo-Saxon mayor to hold office in Winnipeg.
- 1959 — Winnipeg's first major shopping centre, Polo Park, is built.

1960s–1970s

- 1962 — Progressive Conservative Thelma Forbes is named the first woman Speaker in the legislature.
- 1963 — Liberal Margaret Rogers Konantz became the first Manitoba women elected to the House of Commons.
- 1966 — Official opening of the Greater Winnipeg Floodway, also known as Duff's Ditch.
- 1967 — 100th anniversary of Canada's Confederation celebrated around the province.
- June 1, 1967 — The Manitoba government introduces a 5% sales tax.
- 1967 — Winnipeg hosts the Pan Am Games.
- 1967 — The University of Winnipeg and Brandon University are founded.
- 1969 — Red River Community College opened.
- June 24, 1969 — Edward Schreyer formed Canada's first New Democratic Party provincial government.
- 1969 — Folklorama was staged for the first time.
- 1970 — Queen Elizabeth II, Prince Philip, and other dignitaries helped celebrate Manitoba's 100th birthday.
- January 1, 1972 — Amalgamation of Winnipeg: The formation of Unicity made Winnipeg the first major Canadian city to move to a single administration for its entire metropolitan area.
- 1972 — Private auto insurance was replaced by the Manitoba Public Insurance Corporation.
- 1972 — The Winnipeg Jets signed hockey star Bobby Hull and played their first season in the new Winnipeg Hockey Association.
- August 9, 1974 — The first Winnipeg Folk Festival took place at Bird's Hill Park.
- April 30, 1976 — The Royal Canadian Mint's plant in St. Boniface opened.
- 1977 — The Northern Flood Agreement was prepared, an offer of compensation for northern Métis and native communities who were flooded during the re-routing of the Nelson and Churchill Rivers for hydro-electric projects.
- January 22, 1979 — Former Manitoba premier Edward Schreyer was sworn in as Canada's 22nd Governor-General
- February 24, 1979 — An underground pedestrian mall at Winnipeg's Portage and Main was opened by Mayor Robert Steen.
- December 13, 1979 — The Supreme Court of Canada (SCC) declared Manitoba's Official Languages Act (1890) to be invalid. After more court battles, the province eventually agreed it would restore French language serviced, as provided for in Section 23 of the 1870 Manitoba Act.

1980s–1990s

- August 27, 1980 — After 90 years, the Winnipeg Tribune closed.
- October 23, 1981 — Pearl McGonigal, deputy mayor of Winnipeg, was sworn in as Manitoba's 19th Lieutenant-Governor, the province's first woman LG.
- Autumn 1983 — In a series of municipal plebiscites, Manitoba voters overwhelmingly rejected the provincial entrenchment of French language rights and services.
- June 1985 — The SCC declared all of Manitoba's English-only laws invalid and gave the provincial government three years to translate them into French.
- March 8, 1988 — NDP Speaker Jim Walding, still angry with the Premier Howard Pawley for having refused him a cabinet post, toppled his own government by voting with the Progressive Conservatives against the budget.
- 1988–1989 — Meech Lake Accord
  - December 18, 1988 — Gary Filmon presented the federal government's Meech Lake Accord to the Manitoba legislature for ratification.
  - June 22, 1990 — NDP MLA Elijah Harper's seventh and final refusal to allow debate to proceed in the Manitoba legislature in the Meech Lake constitutional accord effectively killing the federal government's constitutional deal.
- July 23, 1989 — Province declared a state of emergency due to the large due to the large number of forest fires ranging throughout the north and the forced evacuation of thousands of northern residents.
- August 29, 1991 — Two-volume report of the Aboriginal Justice Inquiry was released. The report stated natives were generally not treated equally in the justice system and called for aboriginal self-government.
- October 9, 1991 — Approximately 10,000 Manitoba farmers and their supporters demonstrated in Winnipeg against low grain prices and high production costs, the next, the federal government responded with $800 million of various levels of prices.
- October 26, 1992 — Around 61.7% of Manitobans voted against the federal government's newest constitutional offering, the Charlottetown Accord, one of the highest NO votes in Canada.
- January 23, 1993 — Métis leader Yvon Dumont was sworn in as Lieutenant Governor of Manitoba.
- August 15, 1995 — Spirit of Manitoba, a group organized to try to save the Winnipeg Jets franchise, announced that it cannot raise enough funds to keep the team in Manitoba. The team moves to Arizona and is renamed the Arizona Coyotes.
- 1997 — 1997 Red River flood: "Flood of the Century" in the Red River Valley.
- 1997 — Civic addressing in rural Manitoba is introduced as a way to improve deployment of emergency services.
- 1997 — Canada, Manitoba, and 20 First Nations entered into a Treaty Land Entitlement Framework Agreement to fulfill long-standing treaty obligations.
- October 28, 1998 — Glen Murray is elected as Canada's first openly gay Mayor following the 1998 election.
- 1999 — Pan American Games are hosted in Winnipeg for the second time.
- 1999 — The Union of Manitoba Municipalities merges with the Manitoba Association of Urban Municipalities to form the Association of Manitoba Municipalities.

== 21st century ==
- 2002 — Eaton's department store building in downtown Winnipeg is demolished to make way for a sports arena.
- 2002 — Winnipeg Hydro, created as the Winnipeg Hydro-Electric System by the City of Winnipeg in 1911, merges with Manitoba Hydro.
- 2002 — Royal visit by Queen Elizabeth II and Prince Philip.
- 2011 — 2011 Assiniboine River flood: Catastrophic flooding around Lake Manitoba.
- 2011 — The NHL returns to Winnipeg with the purchase of what is now the Winnipeg Jets franchise by the Chipman family.
- 2012 — Ten-digit telephone numbers are required in Manitoba.
- 2014 — The Canadian Museum for Human Rights opens officially.
- 2015 — Smaller municipalities around Manitoba are amalgamated, reducing the total number from 198 to 137.
- 2015 — The Truth and Reconciliation Commission of Canada submits its final report.
- 2019 — Blue Bombers win the Grey Cup.
- 2019 — Uzoma Asagwara, Audrey Gordon, and Jamie Moses become the first black Canadians elected to the Manitoba Legislature.
- 2020 — The downtown Winnipeg flagship store of the Hudson's Bay Company closes.
- 2026 -- Standard Daylight Time rejected; Manitoba stays on Daylight Savings Time.
