= Manitoba Schools Question =

1890–1896 Canadian political crisis

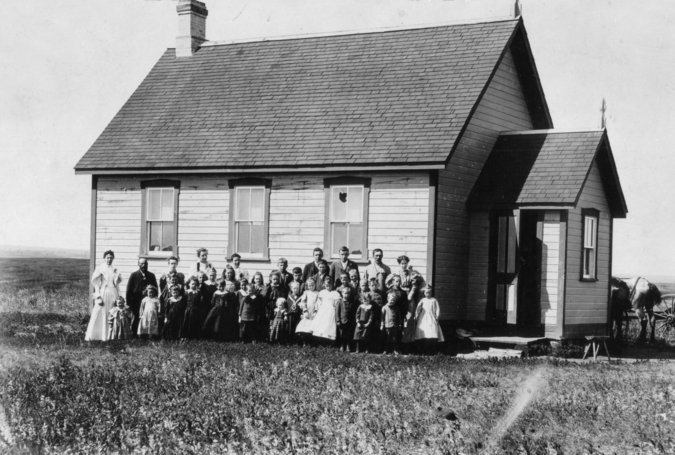
The Wood Lake School, 1896

The Manitoba Schools Question (French: question des écoles du Manitoba) was a political crisis in the Canadian province of Manitoba that occurred late in the 19th century, attacking publicly-funded separate schools for Roman Catholics and Protestants. The crisis was precipitated by a series of provincial laws passed between 1890 and 1896, and another passed in 1916.

The crisis eventually spread to the national level, becoming one of the key issues in the federal election of 1896 and resulted in the defeat of the Conservative government, which had been in power for most of the previous thirty years.

Because of the close linkage at that time between religion and language, the Schools Question raised the deeper question whether French would survive as a language or a culture in Western Canada. The result of the crisis was that, by 1916, English was left as the only official language in use in the province until 1985. As French was no longer an official language, its use declined greatly. Moreover, the Schools Question, along with the execution of Louis Riel in 1885, was one of the incidents that led to strengthening of French Canadian nationalism in Quebec.

== Background ==
=== Foundation of Manitoba (1870) ===
Manitoba became the first western province to join Confederation in 1870. The province was created through negotiations between Canada and the provisional Red River government of Louis Riel, following the Red River Resistance/Rebellion. One of the key issues in the negotiations was the question of control of education in the new province. There was considerable pressure for a system of denominational schools in the new province, for both Protestants and Roman Catholics. Although framed as a religious issue, there was also a question of language-politics involved, since at that time, most Protestants in Manitoba were anglophones and most Roman Catholics were francophones. Religious control over education thus also related to the language of education.

The Act of Parliament that created the province, the Manitoba Act, responded to these concerns by giving the province the power to pass laws relating to education, but also by giving constitutional protection to denominational school rights which existed "by Law or practice in the Province at the Union." The exact meaning of this provision, and the scope of the constitutional protection it provided, subsequently became a matter of considerable political and legal debate.

=== Political and demographic developments (1870–1890) ===
Soon after the Manitoba Act was passed to create the province, settlers from English Canada, mainly Ontario, began to arrive in greater numbers than they had come prior to the Red River Rebellion.

The Manitoba Act had given equal rights to Protestant and Roman Catholic schools, but by the 1880s, this no longer reflected the linguistic makeup of the province. Many Métis had left, and settlers from Quebec were not as numerous as those from Ontario. As the Canadian Pacific Railway was completed in 1886, many more English-speaking settlers had begun to arrive.

Many settlers from Ontario had a different vision of public education. They supported a school system that brought children from different backgrounds together rather than separating them according to their religion. This caused conflict with Catholic families who wished to keep their own schools. The argument was not just about school funding but also about what kind of society Manitoba would become.

There were many changes in Manitoba's population between 1870 and 1891. Nearly half of the non-Indigenous population was French-speaking Catholic and the other half was English-speaking Protestant in 1870. By 1891, Catholics made up approximately 13 per cent of Manitoba's total population. This change contributed to the growth of the Protestant majority's political influence and affected discussions about religious schools.

=== Manitoba legislation (1890–1894) ===
Official Language Act
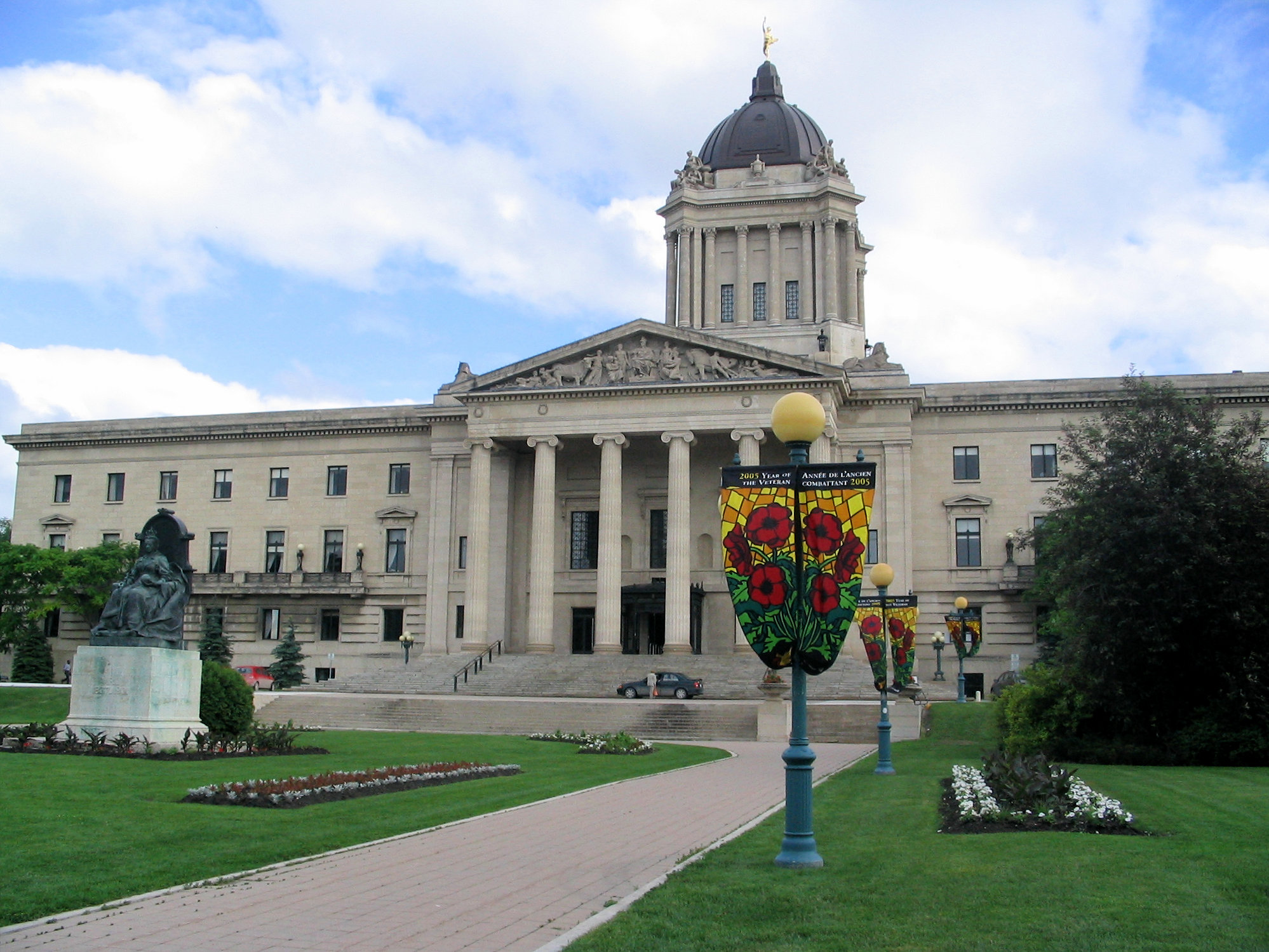

Legislative Assembly of Manitoba
- Long title: An Act to provide that the English Language shall be the Official Language of the Province of Manitoba
- Citation: S.M. 1890, c. 14
- Territorial extent: Manitoba
- Royal assent: 30 March 1890

Text of statute as originally enacted
- Status: Repealed

The Manitoba schools crisis was precipitated by a series of provincial laws passed between 1890 and 1896 and another passed in 1916.

The Manitoba Act of 1870 had provided that English and French be co-official languages in the newly created Province of Manitoba (which initially included only part of southern Manitoba centred on the confluence of the Red and Assiniboine rivers). However, in March 1890, the Manitoba Legislature passed the Official Language Act, making English the only official language in the province. Two years later, in 1892, the neighbouring Northwest Territories (which at the time covered the Canadian Prairies west and northwest of Manitoba) also abolished French as an official language.

Although the abolition of French as an official language did not directly affect the Schools Question, it strengthened the controversy, given the ties between religious schools and the language of education.

When the Province was created, the new provincial government established a system of denominational schools funded by provincial taxes. However, in the same month as the Official Language Act, the Manitoba Legislature passed two bills amending the province’s laws on education: An Act respecting the Department of Education and An Act respecting Public Schools (or, the Public Schools Act). In 1890, Manitoba enact school laws, which were heavily inspired by the Ontario system. Historian Paul Crunican said the two bills that Joseph Martin introduced had 227 clauses. The number of these were 171 from similar Ontario laws, 31 from earlier Manitoba school laws, and 25 new. This demonstrates the impact of Ontario's school system upon the changes in Manitoba.

The Department of Education Act created a Department of Education and turned the two sections of the Board of Education into only one. The Public Schools Act divested funding for Catholic and Protestant denominational schools, establishing instead a system of tax-supported, non-sectarian public schools. In other words, the Act removed the denominational school districts, and in doing so, the French language remained while the Catholic religion did not. If Catholics (mostly francophone) wished to continue education in their religion, they would now have to fund their own schools, in addition to paying taxes for public schools.

Passing this legislation was the response of Premier Thomas Greenway to the popular demand to abolish Manitoba's dual-school system, as many claimed that Catholics were receiving more funds from the province than their numbers warranted and that the quality of education in Catholic schools was poor. The question was whether this legislation was consistent with s. 22(1) of the Manitoba Act.

In 1894, Greenway's government also prohibited municipalities from making expenditures to assist schools outside of the public system. As Catholic parents were limited in their ability to pay for their children’s schooling, this prohibition would ultimately result in the reduction in the number of Catholic schools. While the great majority of these schools maintained their Catholic and private status, many were forced to join the public system. For French-speaking Catholics, the issue of religious education became an issue of identity.

Two rounds of litigation were the result, in each case going to the Judicial Committee of the Privy Council, at that time the highest court in the British Empire. The legislation also triggered considerable national political debate.

== Initial crisis (1891–96) ==
=== Litigations ===
Manitoba's legislation resulted in two rounds of litigation, each going to the Judicial Committee of the Privy Council.

==== City of Winnipeg (1891–92) ====
The first court case, Barrett v. City of Winnipeg (1891), focused on whether the Public Schools Act conflicted with the constitutional protection for denominational schools set out in s. 22 of the 1870 Manitoba Act. Catholics in Manitoba, encouraged by the federal government of Prime Minister John A. Macdonald, challenged the constitutionality of the 1890 Act in the Queen's Bench of Manitoba, arguing that the requirement to pay taxes to the new public school interfered with their rights under s. 22. The Manitoba Queen's Bench held that the new Public Schools Act was valid.

The challengers then appealed to the Supreme Court of Canada in Barrett v. Winnipeg (1891), which allowed the appeal and held that the 1890 Public Schools Act "transgresses the limits of the power given" by s. 22 of the Manitoba Act. Based on the Supreme Court decision, another action was brought in the Manitoba Queen's Bench, which followed the Supreme Court decision and quashed a school tax assessment under the 1890 Act.

City of Winnipeg v. Barrett; City of Winnipeg v. Logan
- Court: Judicial Committee of the Privy Council
- Decided: 1892
- Citation: [1892] A.C. 445 (P.C.)

Case history
- Prior actions: Barrett v. City of Winnipeg (1891), 7 Man. L.R. 273 (Q.B.); Barrett v. Winnipeg (1891), 19 S.C.R. 374; Logan v. City of Winnipeg (1891), 8 Man. L.R. 3 (Q.B.)
- Appealed from: Supreme Court of Canada

The City of Winnipeg then appealed both cases to the Judicial Committee of the Privy Council in Britain which overruled the Supreme Court and held that the 1890 Act was consistent with the Manitoba Act.

The exact point in dispute was the meaning of the phrase "...by Law or practice in the Province at the Union," used in s. 22(1) of the Manitoba Act. The Judicial Committee held that this provision did not itself create a system of denominational schools. Rather, it gave constitutional protection to whatever rights existed with respect to denominational schools in Manitoba in 1870. The Judicial Committee reviewed the historical record and concluded that in 1870, all schools in Manitoba were funded by the religious groups which ran them, and not by any system of public taxation. As a result, the Judicial Committee concluded that s. 22(1) simply guaranteed the right of religious groups to establish and run their own schools, at their own expense. It did not guarantee any public funding for denominational schools, since there was no financial tax support for denominational schools in 1870. Taxpayer funding for denominational schools was only established after the foundation of the Province and was not guaranteed by s. 22(1) of the Manitoba Act, 1870. The Legislature therefore could end taxpayer funding for denominational schools and instead establishing a system of taxpayer funded non-sectarian schools, without being in breach of s. 22(1).

==== Brophy v. Manitoba (1894) ====
Brophy v. Attorney General of Manitoba
- Court: Judicial Committee of the Privy Council
- Decided: 1895
- Citation: 1895 A.C. 202 (P.C.)

Case history
- Prior action: Barrett v. Winnipeg
- Appealed from: Supreme Court of Canada

Although education is normally a matter of exclusive provincial jurisdiction under the Constitution of Canada, there is a special power for the federal government in relation to separate schools. Section 93(3) of the Constitution Act, 1867 provides that there is an appeal to the Governor General in Council "from any Act or Decision of any Provincial Authority affecting any Right or Privilege of the Protestant or Roman Catholic Minority of the Queen's Subjects in relation to Education." Section 93(4) provides that if a province does not comply with a decision of the Governor-in-Council in an appeal under s. 93(3), then Parliament has the power to enact "remedial Laws for the due Execution of the Provisions of this Section and of any Decision of the Governor General in Council under this Section."

Section 22 of the Manitoba Act had similar provisions authorising an appeal to the Governor General in Council and remedial legislation by Parliament.

Following the 1892 Privy Council decision in City of Winnipeg v. Barrett, pressure arose for the federal government to take action under these provisions. However, it was not clear if the changes to the Manitoba school system set out by the 1890 Public Schools Act were sufficient to authorise the federal government to hear an appeal and to enact remedial legislation, in light of the Privy Council's conclusion that the system of taxpayer funded denominational schools which were established in the early 1870s was not constitutionally protected.

To resolve this uncertainty, the federal government referred the matter to the Supreme Court of Canada as a reference question, asking if these constitutional provisions applied. The Supreme Court held that those provisions did not apply, since the post-1870 denominational schools were not constitutionally protected. This decision was appealed to the Privy Council, which overturned the Supreme Court. The Privy Council held that when the Province had created a system of taxpayer funded denominational schools in the early 1870s, it had given a "right or privilege" to the Protestants and Roman Catholics in relation to education. Although that "right or privilege" was not constitutionally entrenched by s. 22(1) of the Manitoba Act, the abolition of the denominational schools could be appealed to the federal government under s. 22(2) of the Manitoba Act, and Parliament could enact remedial legislation under s. 22(3).

=== Political crisis in the Federal government (1894–1896) ===
The "Schools Question", as it was known, had divided the Conservative government since 1890, and especially after Macdonald's death in 1891 when no strong leader replaced him. However, so long as education remained an exclusively provincial jurisdiction, the federal government had limited powers to intervene. In light of the Privy Council decision in Brophy v. Manitoba, the political situation changed. The federal government now had the authority to act; the question was whether it would.

In January 1896, the federal government of Prime Minister Mackenzie Bowell introduced remedial legislation under s. 22(3) of the Manitoba Act, 1870 in the House of Commons. However, the draft legislation was very unpopular with some members of the Conservative caucus, and its introduction triggered a political crisis. Faced with a caucus revolt, Bowell was forced to call an election and to resign in April of that year. Following the election call, with the remedial bill not passed by Parliament, Charles Tupper led the Conservatives in the election and became Prime Minister, though not for long.

The Liberal Party under Wilfrid Laurier, himself a French Catholic, took on a vigorous campaign to prevent the bill from being passed before the government called another election (expected to be in June 1896).

The election of 1896 was centred on the Schools Question. It especially divided Conservatives in Quebec and Ontario; French Catholic Quebecers were offended that French was being eliminated in Manitoba as an official language, while Ontario saw opposition to Catholic support by the strong Orange Order. The Liberals, under Laurier, took advantage of the division in the Conservative party. For the Conservatives, the school question was a tricky one in the 1896 federal election because in Quebec and English Canada, it was understood differently. Conservatives in Quebec focussed on their work to safeguard the rights of Catholic schools in remedial legislation. In English Canada, they advised voters that the proposed legislation had not passed and may never even become law. These various messages provided a glimpse of the party's shortcomings to please voters from both parts of the country.

Laurier, considering Québec's Jesuits’ Estates Act—which drew significant reactions from Ontario's Orange Order—proposed what he called "the sunny way," i.e., achieving a solution through diplomatic negotiations rather than imposing one through legislation, stating during the federal election campaign:

If it were in my power, I would try the sunny way. I would approach this man Greenway with the sunny way of patriotism, asking him to be just and to be fair, asking him to be generous to the minority, in order that we may have peace among all the creeds and races which it has pleased God to bring upon this corner of our common country. Do you not believe that there is more to be gained by appealing to the heart and soul of men rather than to compel them to do a thing?

Laurier won the election and became the 7th Prime Minister of Canada.

=== Laurier–Greenway Compromise, 1896 ===
This particular period of the Manitoba schools crisis ended on 16 November 1896 upon a compromise developed between Prime Minister Wilfrid Laurier and Premier of Manitoba Thomas Greenway, called the Laurier–Greenway Compromise (officially titled the Terms of Agreement between the Government of Canada and the Government of Manitoba for the Settlement of the School Question), which amended the Public Schools Act. This agreement did not reverse the 1890 legislation; instead, it allowed for religious instruction (i.e., Catholic education) in Manitoba's public schools, under certain conditions, for 30 minutes at the end of each day. Moreover, French (like other minority languages) could be used in teaching, but also under certain conditions: only on a school-by-school basis requiring there to be a minimum of 10 French-speaking pupils. They also re-established a Catholic school board, but without government funding, and Catholic teachers could be hired in the public schools, also under particular conditions. The terms of the Laurier–Greenway Compromise were included in Manitoba's education legislation in 1897. This rendered the agreement a part of the province's school law. The new rules allowed for a little religious instruction and bilingual education in public schools. The agreement was thus not only political in nature between two governments, but also resulted in changes to the Manitoba education legislation.

Religious lessons could be given if the majority of school trustees agreed. These lessons could also be requested by parents. In rural schools, a petition had to be signed by the parents or guardians of at least 10 children enrolled in the school. The number in cities, towns and villages was twenty-five children.

These lessons could be taught by a Christian clergyman or by someone else under his authority. Schools were not required to provide religious lessons every day. Trustees or parents could ask for lessons on particular days of the week.

The agreement also provided measures for hiring teachers. In cities and towns, schools with an average attendance of forty or more Roman Catholic children had to employ at least one qualified Catholic teacher if parents submitted the required petition. For villages and rural districts, it was twenty-five children. The same rules applied to non-Catholic families who asked for a certified teacher of their religious affiliation.

Parents also had the option to send their children to religious classes. If they did not want their children to be involved, the students could leave before the religious activities began or remain in another classroom.

The agreement also specified the procedure to be followed for religious instruction in a school at which pupils of different religions were taught. In cases where a separate classroom was not in use, religious instruction was allocated between the two groups on alternate teaching days. But in ordinary school classes it was not possible to segregate students according to religion.

Many Catholics were still opposed to this compromise, and even appealed to Pope Leo XIII. The Pope sent an observer, who concluded, like Laurier, that the compromise was the fairest one possible with so few Catholics left in the province. In response, the pope sent an apostolic delegate to Canada, Msr Rafael Merry del Val, to review the situation on the ground. Relying on Merry del Val's report, Leo XIII produced a papal encyclical Affari vos, in which he advised the Catholics of Manitoba to accept the compromise, while working to improve the situation in the future.

== Repeal and resistance (1916–1923) ==
=== Thornton Act ===
The next part of the crisis came in March 1916, when, with the Thornton Act, the government of Tobias Norris repealed the Public Schools Act amendments made from the Laurier-Greenway Compromise, which allowed for bilingual instruction in Manitoba's public schools. The teaching of any non-English language, as well as the use of such language as a language of instruction, were thereby prohibited in these schools. Moreover, the new legislation also made it so that all new teachers in Manitoba would be trained in English only, as it forced the closure of St. Boniface's French-language teachers’ college.

There were two central reasons behind Norris' repeal. First, in the late 19th century, Canada experienced a large, unforeseen wave of immigration, and as result, Manitoba saw an increase in the number of nationalities represented and languages spoken. The issue was that, due to the Laurier-Greenway Compromise allowing for instruction in minority languages, such made the school system less effective in imposing English as the province's dominant language. The second reason was that, at the time, the level of education of Manitoba's population as a whole was quite poor. (This was more so a problem caused by the lack of truancy-oriented laws, rather than an issue of language.) In 1916, steps were taken in Manitoba to change the whole system of education, and compulsory attendance to the age of fourteen was also instituted. This coincided with the time the provincial government stopped the multilingual education system. The changes reflect that the government was taking decisions on the language of school not only about how long children should be in school.

=== Francophone resistance ===
It was at this point that Franco-Manitobans began to organize resistance in order to ensure the survival of their language in the province.

Established that very year (1916) was the Association d’éducation des Canadiens français du Manitoba (AÉCFM; lit. 'Manitoba French-Canadian Education Association'), which was directed from the shadows by the clergy, and was described as a kind of francophone counterpart to the provincial Department of Education. The AÉCFM encouraged francophone instructors to continue teaching French and to keep using it as a language of instruction without the knowledge of the authorities, even if this required lying to school inspectors. Some school inspectors themselves looked the other way to French being taught at public schools; if an inspector or someone else were to report a teacher for teaching French, the association would assuredly defend them.

At the municipal level, the hiring of teaching staff was the responsibility of school board trustees. Francophones controlled many small local school boards, using the opportunity of this position to hire mostly francophone Catholics.

From 1923 to 1966, AÉCFM held an annual French contest for students in grades 4 through 12 in order to strengthen pride in the French language in the province, publishing contest results in La Liberté, a French-language newspaper in Manitoba. The winners would then be sent to Québec, where they represented their province at the Canada-wide competition. The AÉCFM officially disbanded in 1968.

== Aftermath (1947–) ==
In the mid 20th century, French gradually began to regain its place in the education system of Manitoba.

Circa 1947, Manitoba authorized the teaching of French as a foreign language in its secondary schools. In 1955, Premier Douglas L. Campbell and his Liberal government allowed the teaching of French in grades 4 through 6. In 1959, the Department of Education approved a list of French-language textbooks. In 1967, Premier Dufferin Roblin's government authorized the use of French, for up to half of the school day, as the language of instruction for other subjects. In 1970, Premier Edward Schreyer's government made French a language of instruction equal to English. Consequently, in 1973, Sister Léonne Dumesnil founded Manitoba’s first French-immersion school, École Sacré-Cœur, in Winnipeg.

Manitoba's Bureau de l'Éducation française (BEF; lit. 'Department of French Education') was established 1975 in order to support the development of education in French. The following year, the position of Deputy Minister for French Education was created.

In 1993, a francophone school division was created under the passing of the Public Schools Amendment (francophone Schools Governance) Act. The next year, the new Division scolaire franco-manitobaine (Franco-Manitoban School Division) took under its wing 20 French schools with over 4,000 students. The Division has since expanded to 24 educational institutions (including 1 adult learning centre) as of 2016, with a total of some 5,200 students.

== See also ==
French in Manitoba

- Franco-Manitoban
- Franco-manitoban School Division
- Adélard Langevin, the Catholic Archbishop
- History of Manitoba
- Reference re Manitoba Language Rights

French in Canada

- Anti-Quebec sentiment
- French immersion
- French language in Canada
- Official bilingualism in Canada
  - Timeline of official languages policy in Canada
  - Minister responsible for Official Languages (Canada)
  - Ministry of Francophone Affairs
- Orange Order in Canada, anti-French group
