= Waldman v. Canada =

Waldman v. Canada (Communication No. 694/1996) was a case decided by the UN Human Rights Committee in 1999.

== Facts ==
Under the Education Act of Ontario, every separate school was entitled to full public funding. Separate schools were defined as Roman Catholic schools or Protestant schools. The Education Act stated: "1. (1) "separate school board" means a board that operates a school board for Roman Catholics; ... 122. (1) Every separate school shall share in the legislative grants in like manner as a public school". As a result, Roman Catholic schools (and in some jurisdictions, Protestant schools) were the only religious schools entitled to the same public funding as the public secular schools. The Supreme Court of Canada confirmed the law in two cases, including Reference re Bill 30, An Act to Amend the Education Act (Ont.), [1987] and Adler v. Ontario, [1996].

Mr. Waldman wished to provide his children with a Jewish education, and he faced therefore a financial hardship, which was not experienced by a Roman Catholic parent. He contended that the Education Act violated Articles 2, 18, 26, 27 of the Covenant.

== UN Human Rights Commission views ==
The Committee held that "the Covenant does not oblige States parties to fund schools which are established on a religious basis. However, if a State party chooses to provide public funding to religious schools, it should make this funding available without discrimination. This means that providing funding for the schools of one religious group and not for another must be based on reasonable and objective criteria. In the instant case, the Committee concludes that the material before it does not show that the differential treatment between the Roman Catholic faith and the author's religious denomination is based on such criteria". Therefore, it has found violation of Article 26 (prohibition of discrimination) in the case. The Committee decided that in view of its conclusions in regard to article 26, no additional issue arises for its consideration under articles 18, 27 and 2.

Committee's member Martin Scheinin filed a concurring opinion, noting that "Providing for publicly funded education in minority languages for those who wish to receive such education is not as such discriminatory, although care must of course be taken that possible distinctions between different minority languages are based on objective and reasonable grounds. The same rule applies in relation to religious education in minority religions. In order to avoid discrimination in funding religious (or linguistic) education for some but not all minorities States may legitimately base themselves on whether there is a constant demand for such education".

=== Relation with other case law ===
A day before Waldman decision, HRC rejected a similar complaint from several Canadians as inadmissible, pointing that "the authors while claiming to be victims of discrimination, do not seek publicly funded religious schools for their children, but on the contrary seek the removal of the public funding to Roman Catholic separate schools. Thus, if this were to happen, the authors' personal situation in respect of funding for religious education would not be improved. The authors have not sufficiently substantiated how the public funding given to the Roman Catholic separate schools at present causes them any disadvantage". Four HRC members, however, submitted a separate opinion, considering the case to be admissible and drawing parallel with Waldman v. Canada.

== Subsequent actions ==
In November 2005, HRC repeated that Canada should adopt steps in order to "eliminate discrimination on the basis of religion in the funding of schools in Ontario." This was later published in their concluding observations about Canada on April 20, 2006.
