= Affari vos =

Papal encyclical by Pope Leo XIII

Affari vos Latin for 'Your Affairs' Encyclical of Pope Leo XIII
- Signature date: December 18, 1897
- Subject: On the Manitoba Schools Question
- Number: 68 of 88 of the pontificate
- Text: In Latin; In English

Affari vos (Latin, meaning 'Your Affairs') is a papal encyclical published by Pope Leo XIII in 1897, commenting on the Manitoba Schools Question in Canada.

In his encyclical, Leo reviewed the background to the religious and constitutional dispute in the province of Manitoba concerning publicly funded Catholic schools, and the recent compromise reached by Wilfrid Laurier, the prime minister of Canada, with Thomas Greenway, the premier of Manitoba.

Leo advised the Catholics in Manitoba to accept the compromise solution, while working towards the re-establishment of publicly funded Catholic schools in the future.

== Background ==
When the province of Manitoba was created in 1870, there was a provision in the Manitoba Act, 1870 relating to denominational schools in the province. The guarantee related to public funding for denominational schools, but also had linguistic overtones, as the Catholics in Manitoba at that time tended to be francophone, while the Protestants tended to be anglophone.

Twenty years later, settlement in the province had resulted in a demographic shift, with the majority of the population being Protestant and anglophone. This resulted in the Manitoba government passing a provincial statute which abolished the public funding for denominational schools. The policy shift by the Manitoba government triggered a major political debate in Canada as a whole, between French-Canadians and English-Canadians. There was extensive litigation and an attempt by the federal Conservative government to enact remedial legislation to restore the funding for denominational schools in Manitoba.

In the federal election of 1896, the Conservatives were defeated by the Liberal party, and Wilfrid Laurier, a French-Canadian Catholic from Quebec, became prime minister of Canada. He negotiated a compromise with the premier of Manitoba, Thomas Greenway. The compromise did not restore the previous public funding for religious schools, but provided that there could be Catholic religious education and French schooling in the public schools, if certain conditions were met, school-by-school.

== Appeal to the Pope ==
Some Catholics in Manitoba were not satisfied with the compromise and appealed to Pope Leo for his assistance. In response, Leo appointed Msg Rafael Merry del Val as apostolic delegate to Canada, with instructions to gather information on the situation to assist Leo in making his decision on the issue.

== The Encyclical ==
On December 18, 1897, Leo released the encyclical, entitled Affari vos. In it, he recited the history of the dispute, and paid tribute to the information gathered by Merry del Val on the situation.

Leo acknowledged that the compromise was not ideal, and stated that: "God helping, they will one day obtain full satisfaction". However, he also urged the Catholics in Manitoba to accept the partial solution offered:

This is why, wherever the law or administration or the good dispositions of the people offer some means of lessening the evil and of warding off some of the dangers, it is absolutely expedient and advantageous that they should make use of them and derive all the benefit possible from them. Wherever, on the contrary, there is no other remedy we exhort and conjure them to use a generous liberality. They can do nothing better for themselves or more calculated to redound to the welfare of their country than to contribute, as far as their means will allow, towards the maintenance of their own schools.

He went on to urge the Catholics in Manitoba to develop, as best they could, a solid Catholic educational curriculum that could be used in the public schools under the new situation. He also urged them to show a common front of reasonableness in dealing with the press, with the goal of developing public support for their position.
