= Adler v Ontario =

- Supreme Court of Canada

Hearing: January 23, 24, 1996 Judgment: November 21, 1996
- Full case name: Susie Adler, Mark Grossman, Paula Kezwer, Marcy Rapp and Riky Young v. Her Majesty The Queen in Right of Ontario, the Minister of Education and the Minister of Health; Leo Elgersma, Harry Pott, Raymond Dostal, Harry Fernhout and the Ontario Alliance of Christian Schools Societies v. The Attorney General for Ontario, the Minister of Education and the Minister of Health
- Citations: [1996] 3 S.C.R. 609
- Docket No.: 24347
- Prior history: Judgment for the Attorney General of Ontario, Minister of Education for Ontario, and Minister of Health for Ontario in the Court of Appeal for Ontario.
- Ruling: Appeal dismissed.

Holding
- Government funding of Catholic schools but not of other religious schools does not infringe the constitution.

Court membership
- Chief Justice: Antonio Lamer; Puisne Justices: Gérard La Forest, Claire L'Heureux-Dubé, John Sopinka, Charles Gonthier, Peter Cory, Beverley McLachlin, Frank Iacobucci, John C. Major

Reasons given
- Majority: Iacobucci J., joined by Lamer C.J. and La Forest, Gonthier and Cory JJ.
- Concurrence: Sopinka J., joined by Major J.
- Concur/dissent: McLachlin J.
- Dissent: L'Heureux‑Dubé J.

Adler v Ontario, [1996] 3 S.C.R. 609 is a leading decision of the Supreme Court of Canada on the nature of the provincial education power and whether there was a constitutional obligation to fund private denominational education. The Court found that Ontario's Education Act did not violate sections 2(a) or 15(1) of the Canadian Charter of Rights and Freedoms or section 93 of the Constitution Act, 1867.

== Issues ==
The guarantees provided for religious freedom under sections 2(a) and religious equality under section 15(1) of the Charter were used to argue that lack of government funding for Jewish Canadian schools and certain Christian schools in Ontario was unconstitutional, since by contrast Catholic schools received government funding in accordance with section 93 of the Constitution Act, 1867. The court was asked to address two specific constitutional issues:

1. whether the definitions of "board" and "school" in s. 1(1) of the Education Act, together with the annual general legislative grants, infringe or deny the appellants' freedom of religion under s. 2(a) of the Charter or their s. 15(1) equality rights by not providing funding to dissentient religion‑based schools, and if so, is this non‑funding justified under s. 1, and
2. whether s. 14 of Regulation 552, R.R.O. 1990, which prescribed school health support services as insured services to an insured person who is placed in a special education program in a "school" as defined in s. 1(1) of the Education Act, but not to an insured person in a dissentient religion‑based school, infringes or denies the appellants' freedom of religion under s. 2(a) of the Charter or their s. 15(1) equality rights by not providing these services to dissentient religion‑based independent schools, and if so, was this withholding of services justified under s. 1.

== Ruling of the Supreme Court ==
The ruled 7–1 on the first question, and 6–2 on the second, that the provisions in question were constitutional. L'Heureux‑Dubé J. dissented on both questions, and McLachlin J. dissented in part on the first question, and in full on the second.

=== Funded education ===
The majority of the Court held that the provincial education power under section 93 of the Constitution Act, 1867 is plenary, and is not subject to Charter attack. As Iacobucci J. noted, it is the product of a historical compromise crucial to Confederation and forms a comprehensive code with respect to denominational school rights which cannot be enlarged through the operation of s. 2(a) of the Charter. It does not represent a guarantee of fundamental freedoms. The appellants, given that they cannot bring themselves within the terms of s. 93's guarantees, have no claim to public funding for their schools. To decide otherwise by accepting the appellants' claim that s. 2(a) requires public funding of their dissentient religion‑based schools would be to hold one section of the Constitution violative of another.

The claim that the government's choice to fund Roman Catholic separate schools but not other religious schools contravened the equality provisions of s. 15(1) of the Charter should be rejected for two reasons:

- First, the decision falls "fairly and squarely" within s. 29 of the Charter which explicitly exempts from Charter challenge all rights and privileges "guaranteed" under the Constitution in respect of denominational, separate or dissentient schools.
- Second, the decision is nonetheless "immune" from Charter review because it was made pursuant to the plenary power in relation to education granted to the provincial legislatures as part of the Confederation compromise. One part of the Constitution cannot be used to interfere with rights protected by a different part of that same document.

There was a difference in interpretation as to how far the education power can extend towards the establishment of other education systems. The majority believed that legislation in respect of education could be subject to Charter scrutiny whenever the government decides to go beyond the confines of this special mandate to fund Roman Catholic separate schools and public schools. Sopinka J., on the other hand, observed that nothing in s. 93(3) restricts extending funding to others. However, when the province exercises its plenary power outside of the areas specified in s. 93(1) and (3), any distinctions violating the Charter are not "expressly permitted" or even contemplated. Legislation in such cases is no different from legislation under any of the heads of s. 92. Giving effect to the Charter will not invalidate any power conferred by s. 93.

McLachlin J. stated that Section 93 is not a code ousting the operation of the Charter and was not intended to do more than guarantee school support for the Roman Catholic or Protestant minorities in Ontario and Quebec respectively. Provinces exercising their plenary powers to provide education services must, subject to this restriction, comply with the Charter. Otherwise, she considered the provisions in question to be constitutional.

L'Heureux‑Dubé J. declared that the only school support guaranteed by s. 93 is that required of Ontario and Quebec to their respective Roman Catholic and Protestant minorities. Provinces exercising their plenary powers to provide education must, subject to this requirement, comply with the Charter. The provisions survived a challenge under Section 2, but ought to fail under Section 15.

=== School health support services ===
Both Iacobucci J. and Sopinka J. held that the School Health Support Services Program in question is immune from Charter scrutiny, as it is properly characterized as an "education service", as opposed to a "health service", and thus falls within the plenary education power.

In dissent, both McLachlin J. and L'Heureux‑Dubé J. felt that the Program should not survive a Section 15 Charter challenge, as the denial of the health support program to the independent schools is not rationally connected to the objectives of providing universal education without discrimination, and is not justifiable under Section 1.

== See also ==
- List of Supreme Court of Canada cases
- Waldman v. Canada
- Mahe v. Alberta
