= Public Schools Act (Manitoba) =

Public education legislation in Manitoba, Canada

The Public School Act
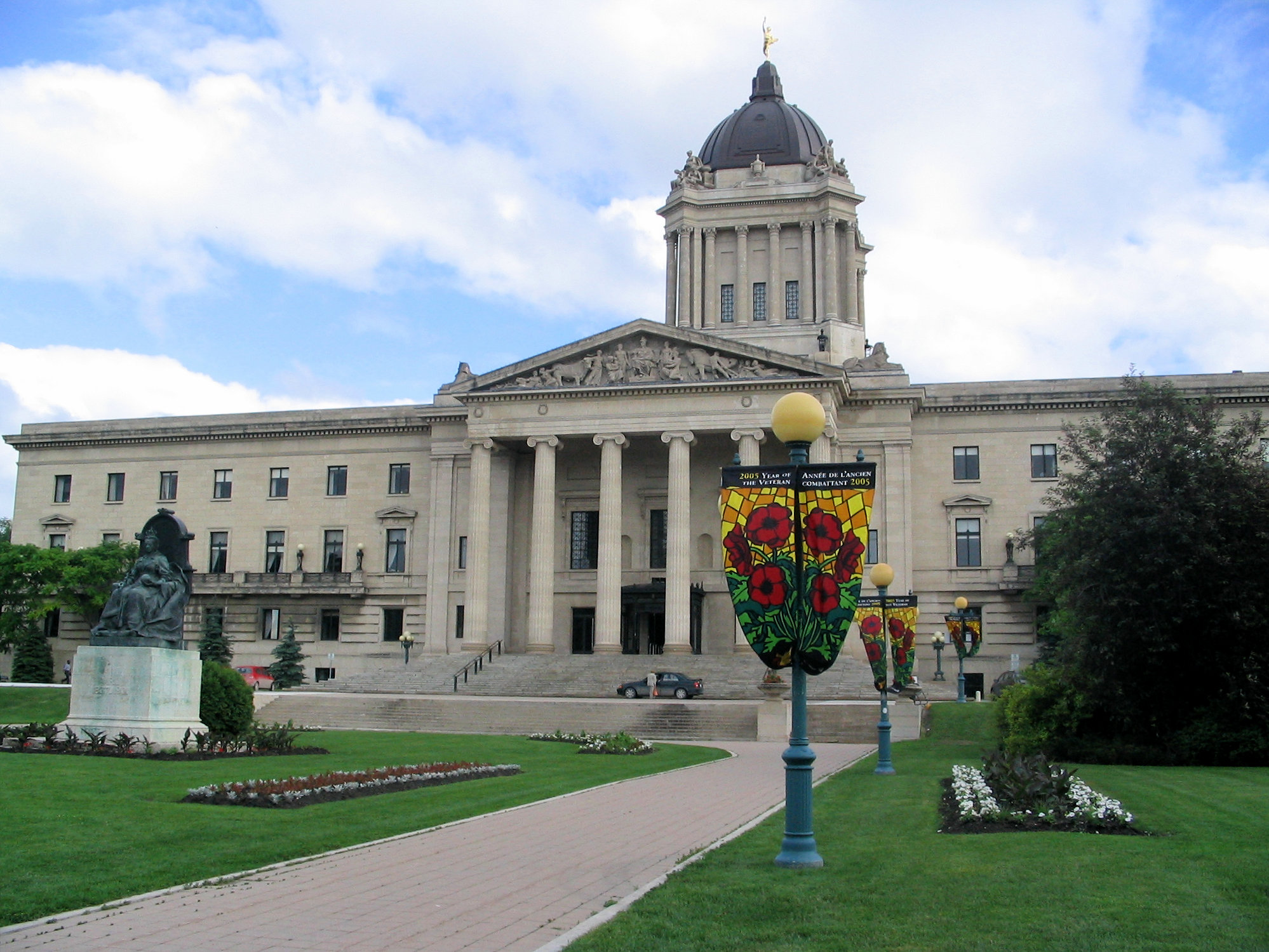

Legislative Assembly of Manitoba
- Citation: CCSM c. P250
- Territorial extent: Manitoba
- Enacted by: RSM 1987, c. P250
- Effective: February 1, 1988
- Administered by: Manitoba Education

Repeals
- Schools Act (SM 1890, c. 38)

Amended by
- SM 2020, c. 21, s. 99 to 131
- Status: Amended

The Public Schools Act (French: Loi sur les écoles publiques) is the legislation that governs public education in Manitoba, Canada.

== Preceding Act ==
In March 1890, the original Manitoba Schools Act (SM 1890, c. 38) was passed by the government of Thomas Greenway, amending the province's existing laws on education under highly controversial circumstances.

The Act eliminated provincial funding for Catholic and Protestant denominational schools, establishing instead a system of tax-supported, nonsectarian public schools.

This prohibition would ultimately lead to the reduction of Catholic schools, as many Catholic parents were unable to pay for schooling. While the great majority of these schools maintained their Catholic and private status, many were forced to join the public system. For French-speaking Catholics, the issue of religious education became an issue of identity. Not only would this provoke a national controversy known as the Manitoba school crisis, but it would also lead to a rise in French-Canadian nationalism, as Catholics at the time were mostly francophone.

The early half of the crisis ended on 16 November 1896 when the Schools Act was amended after Prime Minister Wilfrid Laurier and Premier of Manitoba Thomas Greenway reached a compromise, called the "Laurier-Greenway Compromise" (officially the Terms of Agreement Between the Government of Canada and the Government of Manitoba for the Settlement of the School Question). Rather than reversing the 1890 Act, the agreement allowed for religious instruction (i.e., Catholic education) in Manitoba's public schools under certain conditions for 30 minutes at the end of each day. Also, French (like other minority languages) could be used in teaching; however, such would also be under certain conditions: only on a school-by-school basis requiring there to be a minimum of 10 French-speaking students. They also re-established a Catholic school board, though without government funding, and Catholic teachers could be hired in the public schools, also under specific conditions.

However, in March 1916, the government of Tobias Norris passed the Thornton Act, which repealed the Schools Act amendments made from the Laurier-Greenway Compromise. From this legislation, the teaching of any non-English language, along with the use of non-English language as a language of instruction, were prohibited in Manitoba's public schools. In addition, the new law also forced the closure of Saint Boniface's French-language teachers' college, thus ensuring that all new teachers in Manitoba could only be trained in English.

Since this time, the controversy has largely resolved, as the French language gradually moved to regain its place in the province's education system during the mid-20th century. French language rights were restored in the 1980s.

The current administration of the act has no connection to its contentious origins.

== See also ==
- List of school districts in Manitoba
  - Franco-manitoban School Division
- List of schools of Winnipeg
