= Timeline of official languages policy in Canada =

Because the country contains two major language groups and numerous other linguistic minorities, in Canada official languages policy has always been an important and high-profile area of public policy.

In an exhaustive 1971 study of Canadian language law prepared for the Royal Commission on Bilingualism and Biculturalism, Claude-Armand Sheppard offered this definition for the term “official language”: “[An] official language is a language in which all or some of the public affairs of a particular definition are, or can be, conducted, either by law or custom. We take public affairs to comprise the parliamentary and legislative process, administrative regulations, the rendering of justice, all quasi-judicial activities, and the overall day-to-day administration.”

This article lists key events in the evolution of language policy in Canada since 1710, when the French-speaking population of Acadia first came under British administration. The timeline covers the policies of the colonial predecessors to the current Canadian state, and the policies of Canada's provinces and territories. The policies listed include:

- Legislative changes including constitutional amendments, acts of Parliament, and Orders in Council;
- Major policy announcements including abortive policy proposals that were never implemented;
- Key administrative initiatives governing the implementation of major policies;
- Court decisions relating to Canada's language laws.

These policy changes have been important to the extent that they affected the lives of individual Canadians. Therefore, in order to give some idea of the relative importance of various policies over the centuries, population statistics for Canada's different language groups are included where such information is available.

== General themes in official languages policy ==
Official languages policies, in one form or another, have been in existence since the beginning of the European colonization of North America. In the early years, French was the sole language used in New France while English had been the sole language of British America. The First Nations continued to use their indigenous languages in their own affairs. There were a limited number of people who knew both a European and a native North American language, often Christian missionaries the “black robes” and the children of natives they ministered to. These bilinguals were called on in diplomacy, but otherwise the linguistic worlds of the settlers and the natives were largely separate. Without being fluent, natives and settlers often learned very rudimentary forms of each other's languages called “pidgins”. Pidgins, such as the Algonquian–Basque pidgin, Labrador Inuit Pidgin French, American Indian Pidgin English, and Pidgin Delaware were initially important languages of trade and diplomacy, but none of them was ever prestigious enough to be used in any other governmental context.

The need for a considered language policy came with the absorption New France into the British Empire. This began with the Siege of Port Royal in 1710 followed by the conquest of New France in 1758. Britain was then ruling over a large population of non-English speaking white settlers. In what is now the eastern half of the country, some sort of accommodation was made for French during the long period of British colonial rule that followed, but at no point did the language achieve full legal and practical equality with English. The public reaction to this situation was one of the sources of the political instability that led to the adoption of a series of constitutions, culminating in the adoption of a federal structure in 1867 as a way of allowing the two languages to have different levels of official status in different provinces.

Following Confederation in 1867, French and English were treated as being fully equal within Quebec, in all matters under provincial jurisdiction. In matters under federal jurisdiction, English occupied a de facto privileged position, and French was not fully equal, although it did enjoy some constitutionally protected privileges. In other provinces, French was sometimes tolerated and sometimes actively suppressed. Other settler languages, such as Scottish Gaelic, Irish, and German were ignored in politics and increasingly suppressed with adoption of universal public education.

Aboriginal languages, which earlier Christian missionaries had studied and helped to document, came under sustained attack by a system of state-sponsored church-run residential schools beginning in the 1840s in the east and later extending across the country. These schools were part of a deliberate policy to suppress or eliminate indigenous languages in favour of English. Over the course of the Twentieth and early Twenty-first centuries, the two predominant settler languages, English and French, have gradually achieved a greater level of equality in most of Canada's provinces, and full equality at the federal level. The trend has been very different in Quebec, however, where in the 1970s English was formally deprived of its status of full legal equality. Today, French is, both de facto and de jure, the sole official language of Quebec.

Also since the 1970s and the adoption of the policy of multiculturalism in Canada, teaching of other languages besides English and French, not only as a separate subject but as the medium of instruction, has expanded dramatically, beginning primarily with European languages, notably Ukrainian, the policy changes at the provincial level have seen a boom in schools catering to a variety of language groups. For example, in Edmonton, Alberta in 2015 the Catholic school board offered full immersion in French, "bilingual programs" (one third to one half time immersion) in Polish, Spanish, and Ukrainian, and part-time language and culture programs in Filipino, Italian, Japanese, Korean, Spanish, and Nehiyaw Pimatisiwin (Cree). Likewise, the public school board offered American Sign Language Bilingual, Arabic Bilingual, Chinese (Mandarin) Bilingual, French Immersion, Late French Immersion, German Bilingual, Hebrew Bilingual, International Spanish Academy, Ukrainian International Bilingual, and Awasis (Cree) programs.

== Official languages policy and legislation relating to the Province of Canada (1840-1867) and the Dominion of Canada (1867-present) ==
- 1840: The Act of Union is adopted. Section 41 of the Act bans the French language from Parliament and Courts of the new united Province of Canada.
- 1841: At the first meeting of the Legislative Assembly of the Province of Canada, Austin Cuvillier, a French-Canadian, is elected as the first Speaker. As well, the new Parliament adopts rules of order. Rule 29 provides for the translation of papers into French. Rule 38 provides for the reading of motions in both French and English.
- 1841: The Parliament of the Province of Canada adopts An Act to provide for the translation into the French Language of the Laws of the Province, which ensures that a non-official copy of all Canadian laws will be "distributed among the People of this Province speaking the French language, in the same manner in which the English text of the said Laws shall be printed and distributed among those speaking the English language...."
- 1848: Article 41 of the Act of Union is amended. In a return to the situation that had existed from 1792 to 1837 in Lower Canada, it is once again legal to use the French language in the Parliament and in the Courts.
- 1857: Section 15 of the Act respecting the Codification of the Laws of Lower Canada relative to Civil Matters and Procedure requires that the Civil Code of Lower Canada be printed only in bilingual form, with English and French displayed on the same page: “[T]he two texts, when printed, shall stand side by side.” Side-by-side publication is a first step towards the adoption of the "Equal Authenticity Rule" for interpreting bilingual statutes.
- 1867: Section 133 of the British North America Act, 1867 (later renamed the Constitution Act, 1867) decrees that "The Acts of the Parliament of Canada and of the Legislature of Quebec shall be printed and published in both those Languages [ie. in both English and French]", and also mandates the use of both French and English for parliamentary debates, parliamentary publications, and federal court cases.
- 1935: R. v. DuBois: The Supreme Court of Canada applies the rule of judicial interpretation that will come to be known as the “Equal Authenticity Rule” to Acts of Parliament. This rule of interpretation holds that section 133 of the Constitution Act, 1867 requires courts to treat “both [the English and French] versions of statutes [as] equally valid and authoritative interpretations of the law,” even if the statute in question was clearly drafted in one language and translated into the other, and even if the two versions of the law are incompatible. This rule had been applied to Quebec legislation since 1891, as a consequence of the court's ruling in CPR v. Robinson.
- 1959: The Conservative government of John Diefenbaker introduces simultaneous interpretation in the House of Commons. Prior to this, the right to use English or French in Parliament had been guaranteed, but unilingual MPs had been unable to understand each other's speeches.
- 1962: From this date, family allowance cheques are mailed in bilingual form, nationwide.
- 1963: The Liberal government of Lester Pearson establishes the Royal Commission on Bilingualism and Biculturalism “to inquire into and report upon the existing state of bilingualism and biculturalism in Canada.”.
- 1963: The Pearson government established an interdepartmental committee of senior public servants to report regarding measures to promote bilingualism in the Public Service.
- 1964: The first language school for Public Servants opens.
- 1964: A private member's bill, initiated by Liberal backbencher Jean Chrétien, gives Canada's state-owned airline, Trans-Canada Air Lines, the new bilingual name "Air Canada," starting a trend of giving bilingual names to federal institutions which formerly had borne English-only names.
- 1968: From this date forward, statutes of Canada are printed with the English and French texts of the law side by side, rather than in separate volumes. This "allows for a first-hand comparison of both texts...." Side-by-side publication is an indication of the internalization, within the Canadian parliament, of the "Equal Authenticity Rule".
- 1965: The Royal Commission on Bilingualism and Biculturalism releases a Preliminary Report that underlined the cultural and linguistic duality of Canadian society.
- 1967-70: The Royal Commission on Bilingualism and Biculturalism releases a final report in six books, The Official Languages (1967), Education (1968), The Work World (Socioeconomic Status, the Federal Administration, the Private Sector, 1969), The Cultural Contribution of the Other Ethnic Groups (1969), The Federal Capital (1970), and Voluntary Associations (1970).
- 1969: The Liberal government of Pierre Trudeau enacts the Official Languages Act.
- 1970: The Secretary of State (the future Department of Canadian Heritage) establishes the Official Languages in Education Program to supervise financial transfers from Ottawa to the provinces and territories to promote two objectives: First, to promote second-language training in public schools across Canada with the goal of promoting an increase in personal bilingualism; and second, to financially promote education for the linguistic minority of the province (English in Quebec, French elsewhere).
- 1973: Parliament passes a Resolution on Official Languages in the Public Service confirming the right of civil servants to work in the official language of their choice.
- 1974: Jones v. Attorney General of New Brunswick: The Supreme Court of Canada rejects the argument of Moncton mayor Leonard Jones that the Official Languages Act is unconstitutional because it deals with subject matter outside the jurisdiction of the federal government.
- 1974: The Consumer Packaging and Labelling Act requires the use of both French and English on all consumer packaging across the country; bilingual packaging remains one of the most visible aspects of bilingualism for the Canadian general public resulting in this aspect of bilingualism sometimes being termed "cereal box bilingualism".
- 1978: The Criminal Code is amended to give accused persons the right to be heard by a judge (a judge and jury, in the event of a jury trial) who speaks the official language of the accused.
- 1986: Société des Acadiens v. Association of Parents: The Supreme Court of Canada rules that the right of the accused, under section 19 of the Charter of Rights, to use English or French in a trial, does not guarantee the right to be heard by a judge who speaks the defendant's preferred language. This decision is reversed in 1999, in R. v. Beaulac.
- 1988: A second version of the Official Languages Act is introduced, taking into account the new requirements of the Charter of Rights.
- 1988: The Conservative government of Brian Mulroney enacts the Air Canada Public Participation Act, which allows for the state-owned airline to be privatized, but which also provides that, even as a private company, Air Canada will be required to operate in conformity with the Official Languages Act, precisely as it had done when it was government-owned. In 2003, Air Canada will restructure, spinning off a number of independent companies, including Jazz Airlines. Because these new entities are not part of Air Canada, they are no longer subject to the terms of the Air Canada Public Participation Act, and hence cease to be obligated to adhere to the practices of the Official Languages Act.
- 1989: Saulnier v. The Queen: A Nova Scotia county court rules that under section 20 of the Charter of Rights, a federal government department cannot simply presume that there is no need for French –language services, particularly where French-speakers might face penalties for failing to comply with laws of which they could not be fully aware unless these had been explained to them in their own language.
- 1993: Professional Institute of the Public Service v. the Queen: The Federal Court of Canada rules that sections 32 and 33 of the Official Languages Act impose a positive burden upon the federal government not only to react or respond to pressures for more or better bilingual services, but to initiate programmes to those serves where there is a perceived need for them.
- 1993: R. v. Haché: The New Brunswick Court of Appeal rules that the government is not under a positive obligation to inform people that they have a right to services in their own language.
- 1999: R. v. Beaulac: The Supreme Court of Canada rules that section 530 of the Criminal Code, which allows for the accused to be heard in court in his or her preferred official language, be given a generous, purposive interpretation.
- 2002: Quigley v. Canada (House of Commons) : The Federal Court of Canada, Trial Division, rules that the House of Commons is obliged to ensure that, in any part of the country where its proceedings are broadcast in one language, they must also be broadcast in the other official language.
- 2003: The Liberal government of Jean Chrétien tables its Action Plan for Official Languages. The Action Plan includes a statement of intention to raise the ratio of bilingual young Canadians (aged 15–19) from 24% in 2001 to 50% in 2013.
- 2005: An Act to amend the Official Languages Act (promotion of English and French) (better known at the time of its passage as "Bill S-3") is enacted, making Part VII of the Official Languages Act justiciable.
- 2006: Desrochers v. Canada (Industry): The Federal Court of Appeal rules that section 25 of the Official Languages Act requires third parties providing services to the public on behalf of a federal department "to provide these services in both official languages if ... the federal institution or federal government were themselves subject to this obligation." This decision is a virtual twin to the Supreme Court of Canada's 2008 ruling, regarding services provided on behalf of a provincial government, in Société des Acadiens et Acadiennes du Nouveau-Brunswick Inc v Canada.
- 2008: The Conservative government of Stephen Harper amends the Criminal Code to require that all accused persons are advised of their right to have the proceedings conducted in the official language of their choice.
- 2008: The Conservative government of Stephen Harper tables its Roadmap for Canada's Linguistic Duality, a five-year plan to spend $1.1 billion to promote the two official languages.

== Official languages policy and legislation relating to the provinces and territories ==
=== Laws and policies applicable to all provinces and territories ===
- 1917: Ottawa Separate Schools Trustees v. Mackell: The Judicial Committee of the Privy Council rules that section 93 of the Constitution Act, 1867 provides guarantees only of religious education, not of the language in which that education will take place. In consequence of this ruling, French-speaking minorities in Ontario and elsewhere are not able to use section 93 in order to force provincial governments to permit francophone students to be educated in French. Although the ruling applies in theory to all provinces, it has no practical impact on Quebec, where the provincial government continues, for several more decades to provide full access to English-language schooling to all students whose parents want it.
- 1982: The Constitution Act, 1982 requires provinces and territories, under section 23, to make education available in both official languages where numbers warrant.
- 1990: Mahe v. Alberta: The Supreme Court of Canada rules that section 23 guarantees a "sliding scale." In certain circumstances, the children whose parents could exercise the right might be so few that literally no minority language education may be provided by the government. With a greater number of children, some schools might be required to provide classrooms in which the children could receive minority language education. An even greater number would require the construction of new schools dedicated solely to minority language education.
- 2000: Arsenault-Cameron v. Prince Edward Island: The Supreme Court of Canada applies a purposive interpretation to section 23, ruling that the purpose of this section is to redress past injustices and provide "an official language minority with equal access to high quality education in its own language in circumstances where community development will be enhanced."
- 2003: Doucet-Boudreau v. Nova Scotia (Minister of Education) The Supreme Court of Canada again expands the scope of section 23 by determining that the right of parents belonging to official-language minorities to have their children educated in their mother tongue is a positive right requires governments to act in a timely fashion to provide minority language programs and/or facilities, and may require the judiciary to order affirmative remedies to secure these rights. The court rules that it was therefore legitimate for a lower-court judge to require the provincial government to report to him periodically on the construction of French-language schools that had been proceeding more slowly than he had deemed permissible.
- 2008: Société des Acadiens et Acadiennes du Nouveau-Brunswick Inc v Canada: The Supreme Court of Canada rules that agencies which are not organs of a provincial government, but which provide a service on behalf of that province, are under the same obligation to provide bilingual services that would exist if the agency was an integral part of the provincial government. This ruling occurred in the context of a traffic ticket issued by the Royal Canadian Mounted Police, by an officer who could not speak French, to a Francophone driver; policing is a provincial government function, and in New Brunswick all persons have a right to receive this government service in both official languages. The court ruled that the fact that policing had been contracted out (to a federal government agency) did not void this right. This decision is a virtual twin to the Federal Court of Appeal's 2006 ruling, regarding services provided on behalf of the federal government, in Desrochers v. Canada (Industry).

=== Alberta ===
For events prior to the creation of the province 1905, see Northwest Territories

- 1905: Under the provisions of the Alberta Act, the new province of Alberta is carved out of the Northwest Territories. Section 16 of the Alberta Act calls for the continuation within the new province of all existing Northwest Territories legislation. Therefore, because the Northwest Territories legislature had voted in 1892 to make that English the only official language for that territory, Alberta comes into existence as an officially unilingual jurisdiction.
- 1988: R. v. Mercure. The Supreme Court of Canada rules that Saskatchewan is legally obligated to enact all laws in both French and English, but that this obligation may be altered or repealed by a 'clear legislative pronouncement' of the provincial legislature. Because Alberta and Saskatchewan came into being at the same time, and as the result of nearly identical federal laws, this ruling is seen as having equal application to Alberta.
- 1988: In response to the Supreme Court ruling in R. v. Mercure, the legislature enacts the Languages Act, which provides that any provincial laws or regulations may be enacted in English only.
- 2009: R. v. Caron: The Alberta Court of Queen's Bench rules that the Royal Proclamation of 1869, which transferred Rupert's Land and the North-Western Territory to Canada, did not have "the effect of constitutionalizing language rights in the remaining territories [i.e. outside the Red River Colony which forms the core area of Manitoba].... Accordingly, when the Canadian Parliament created the Province of Alberta and established its constitution in 1905, there was no constitutional condition requiring it to include in the Province's constitution an obligation to publish provincial legislation in English and French." This means that Alberta laws enacted in English only are still valid. The case is currently under appeal before the Alberta Court of Appeal.

=== British Columbia ===
- 1849: The Crown Colony of Vancouver Island is established by an Act of the Imperial Parliament. As with the prior establishment of colonies in the Maritimes, the domestic laws of England are extended to the new colony. This means that, as in England, English is the only official language of the new colony.
- 1858: The Crown Colony of British Columbia is established by an Act of the Imperial Parliament. The template provision used for the Vancouver Island colony is again used: domestic English law is applied to the new colony, which therefore has English as its only official language.
- 1865: British Columbia and Vancouver's Island are merged into a single colony. English remains the only official language.
- 1871: The Crown Colony of British Columbia becomes a Canadian province. English remains the only official language in matters of provincial jurisdiction.

=== Manitoba ===
- 1845: The Council of Assiniboia agrees to promulgate all laws in both French and English. Given the small size of the colony and the limited literacy of the population, promulgation consists of distributing bilingual copies of all ordinances be put on public display at the courthouse, distributed to all Protestant and Catholic clergy, “and, lastly, that copies, in both languages, be read aloud and explained at meetings of the General Court in November and February of each year....”
- 1849: The Council of Assiniboia agrees to henceforth conduct all judicial proceedings in both English and French. According to Claude-Armand Sheppard, this event “marked the beginning of bilingualism in the courts of Assiniboia.” .
- 1869: The provisional government of Louis Riel issues a list of fourteen rights which it regards as necessary for the future permanent government of the region. Items 10 and 11 relate to official languages:

“10. That the English and French languages be common in the Legislature and Courts, and that all public documents and Acts of the Legislature be published in both languages.”
”11. That the Judge of the Supreme Court speak the English and French languages....”

- 1870: The Manitoba Act establishes the new province of Manitoba. The Act serves as a de facto provincial constitution. Under section 22 of the Act, denominational schools on the model used in Quebec are to be established in the province. Section 23 of the Act uses the model established in 1867 for Quebec for Manitoba's provincial legislature, which must conduct its debates and enact all laws and journals in both English and French.
- 1890: The Manitoba Schools Act removes funding for Catholic schools (which in practice meant all French-language schools).
- 1890: The legislature enacts An Act to Provide that the English Language shall be the Official Language of the Province of Manitoba (better-known as the Official Language Act abolishes French as an official language of the legislature and requires that only English be used in Manitoba courts.
- 1892: Pellant v. Hebert: The recently enacted law establishing English as the only official language of the province is found to be ultra vires (and therefore unconstitutional) by the St. Boniface County Court. The provincial government simply ignores this decision, as well as a parallel 1909 decision of the same court (Bertrand v. Dussault) which also finds the law to be ultra vires.
- 1896: The Laurier-Greenway Compromise: Catholic education is permitted in public schools, and French may be used in teaching, but only on a school-by-school basis and only when there is a minimum of 10 French-speaking pupils. A Catholic school board is re-established, but without government funding.
- 1900: The provincial legislature amends the electoral law to permit qualified electors to vote as long as they are literate in English, French, German, Icelandic or any other Scandinavian language.
- 1916: The Laurier-Greenway Compromise of 1896 is rescinded by the Liberal government of Tobias Norris and French instruction is abolished.
- 1916: Dumas v. Baribault: In this case, a court is asked to overturn the decision of a prothonotary who had rejected a statement of claim on the basis that it was written in French only. In practice, therefore, the case tests the legal status of French in judicial proceedings in Manitoba. The court refuses to issue a writ of mandamus, thereby upholding the province's 1890 Official Language Act.
- 1955: The provincial government permits instruction in French from grade four to grade 12 in certain schools.
- 1966: The first of two amendments to the provincial Public Schools Act (the second taking place in 1970) reintroduce French-language instruction.
- 1979: Manitoba (Attorney General) v. Forest: The Supreme Court of Canada rules that the Official Language Act of 1890 is ultra vires.
- 1983: On October 5, Parliament unanimously passes a resolution asking the Manitoba legislature to enact a proposed constitutional amendment which would have made French an official language of Manitoba and ensured that under certain circumstances, provincial government services would be offered in French. Another resolution on Manitoba Francophones is passed on Feb. 24, 1984. Ultimately, the legislature fails to enact the proposed amendment, and the federal government responds by referring the question of the constitutional validity of Manitoba's Official Language Act to the Supreme Court of Canada.
- 1985: Reference re Manitoba Language Rights: The Supreme Court of Canada rules that the provincial government acted unconstitutionally in enacting its laws in English only from 1890 onwards. The province is given a limited time in which to re-enact its laws in French. At the end of this period, any law that has not been enacted in a French version will be of no force or effect.
- 1986: Bilodeau v. Attorney General of Manitoba: The Supreme Court of Canada rules that the use of French on government documents such as parking tickets is not mandated by section 133 of the Constitution Act, 1867.
- 1999: The French Language Services Policy is adopted, with the intention of providing comparable levels of provincial government services in both official languages, including public utilities and health services, official documents such as parking tickets and court summonses, availability of translation at court and commission hearings, and bilingual government web sites.

=== New Brunswick ===
For events prior to the creation of the colony in 1784, see Nova Scotia

- 1784-1867: In 1784 the colony of New Brunswick is created out of territory formerly belonging to Nova Scotia. “By virtue of custom and usage as well as the importation of English law into New Brunswick, English law [becomes] and [remains] the official tongue of that province. Before Confederation there were no legal statutes whatever governing language rights.” However, in practice French is used as a language of schooling in Acadian communities (provided by the Catholic Church), and court cases are conducted in French in certain New Brunswick jurisdictions. When French-language schooling is eventually regulated in the 1870s, the province greatly limits the use of French. But French continues to be used informally in the courts until the practice is formalized in the 1970s.
- 1871: The legislature enacts the Common Schools Act, ending the province's separate Catholic school system-and therefore limiting the availability of French-language schooling in the province. French language instruction is permitted only until Grade Three.
- 1875: The provincial government relents slightly, permitting the use of some French translations of English texts in the classroom.
- 1878: The provincial government allows francophone teachers to be trained at the provincial normal school.
- 1928: The Conservative government of Premier JBM Baxter proposes Regulation 32, which would have allowed local school boards to adopt a bilingual programme. The proposal meets with strong anglophone opposition, and is withdrawn.
- 1966: The Liberal government of Louis Robichaud amends the Schools Act to permit all francophone and anglophone primary-school students to receive instruction in their mother tongue.
- 1967: The New Brunswick Schools Act is enacted by the Liberal government of Louis Robichaud in an "attempt...to equalize francophone and anglophone education by centralizing the administration of the school system. The new law replaces the previous 422 school boards with 33 district school boards, and turned the funding for these schools over to the provincial Department of Education. Under the terms of the 1943 County Schools Finance Act, each school had had its own school board, and funding had come from solely from county governments. The francophone population, which at the time was concentrated in poorer rural areas, had therefore been at a perpetual educational disadvantage.
- 1968: The opposition Progressive Conservatives, led by future premier Richard Hatfield, propose a motion in the legislature to recognize the equality of the French language. This motion is defeated by Premier Robichaud's Liberal majority.
- 1968: R. v. Murphy: The New Brunswick Court of Appeal rules that a 1731 statute of the United Kingdom parliament, abolishing the use of French in that country's courts, was incorporated into New Brunswick law at the time that the colony was created, meaning that only English may be used in the province's courts.
- 1969: The Liberal government of Louis Robichaud enacts the Official Languages of New Brunswick Act.
- 1973: Release of the report of the Department of Education's Task Force on Social Development (better known at the time as the "MacLeod-Pinet Report", recommending that francophones be given control of their own educational institutions by dividing the Department of Education into two sections along linguistic lines, with a deputy minister for each of the two systems, both of whom would report to the same minister of education. This recommendation is adopted in 1974 by the Conservative government of Richard Hatfield.
- 1979: Release of the report of the Commission on the Organization and Boundaries of School Districts in New Brunswick (better known at the time as the "Finn-Elliott Report") calling for the abolition of bilingual schools because they lead to the assimilation of francophone students, and their replacement by "homogenous schools" in which all student will be educated in their mother tongue. This becomes the basis upon which the provincial school system is later reorganized, and eventually constitutionally entrenched by means of Section 16.1 of Canada's Charter of Rights.
- 1981: The Progressive Conservative government of Richard Hatfield enacts An Act Recognizing the Equality of the Two Official Linguistic Communities in New Brunswick (better known at the time as "Bill 88").
- 1982: Release of the "Poirier-Bastarache Report" (officially titled, Towards Equality of Official Languages in New Brunswick). The report, which had been commissioned by Premier Hatfield in 1980 to make suggestions as to how best to update the 1969 Official Languages of New Brunswick Act, sets out 96 recommendations, which turn out to be sufficiently controversial that two years later, a special Advisory Committee is set up to conduct public hearings into the recommendations.
- 1993: Section 16.1 is added to Canada's Charter of Rights, entrenching "the right to distinct [i.e. separate] educational institutions [for the province's] English-speaking and French-speaking communities] and such distinct cultural institutions as are necessary for the preservation and promotion of those communities."
- 2001: Charlebois v. Moncton (City): The New Brunswick Court of Appeal rules that all municipal laws must be enacted in both official languages in all municipalities in which there is a minority-language population of 20% or more (all such municipalities having been, under the province's language law, designated bilingual). The province complies with the ruling by providing financing for all pre-existing statutes to be translated into French.
- 2002: The legislature enacts the Official Languages Act. This law repeals the 1969 Official Languages of New Brunswick Act, replacing its provisions with more detailed and extensive rights protections.
- 2005: Charlebois v. Saint John (City): The Supreme Court of Canada rules that it is not necessary, under the terms of the province's Official Languages Act, for New Brunswick municipalities which have not been designated bilingual by the provincial government to nevertheless operate in both official languages. Had the court ruled that municipalities were institutions of the province, they would have fallen under the province's legal obligation to operate in both official languages. Instead, the court holds that municipalities are incorporated entities and therefore not “institutions” of the province.

=== Northwest Territories ===
- 1873-1876: In the absence of federal legislation dealing with language, the Territorial Council makes provision for all laws and ordinances to be published in English, French and Cree, and in practice allows the courts to operate in both English and French. Therefore, “in the period prior to the separate political existence of the Northwest Territories [as enacted by Parliament in 1875 and effected in 1876], there was a rudimentary and unofficial bilingualism....”
- 1875: Parliament enacts the Northwest Territories Act, which goes into effect in 1876. This law creates uncertainty regarding the legal status of languages in the Territorial Council and courts, because it contains no provisions dealing with language.
- 1877: The Parliament of Canada amends the Northwest Territories Act to include the following provision:

Either the English or the French language may be used by any person in the debates of the said [Territorial] Council, and in the proceedings before the Courts, and both of those languages shall be used in the records and journals of the said Council, and the ordinances of the said Council shall be printed in both those languages.

When legislation is drawn up in 1880 to permit the creation of a Territorial Assembly, Parliament amends the law slightly to permit the use of both languages in the new Assembly as well.
At this time, the Territory includes the landmass that today makes up the provinces of Saskatchewan and Alberta, parts of Manitoba, all of what today is the Yukon Territory, and the parts of Nunavut and the present-day Northwest Territories that are part of the North American mainland. In 1877 most of the population of this vast region consists of aboriginals who speak neither English nor French and have little or no contact with the government, but in the settled areas in the south, the Territory has a population of 3,104 English-speakers and 2,896 French-speakers.

- 1891: Following a high-profile campaign by independent MP D’Alton McCarthy to use federal legislation to abolish the official status of French in the Northwest Territories, a compromise bill, An Act to Amend the Northwest Territories Act, is enacted by Parliament. This Act amends Section 110 of the Northwest Territories Act to state that “Either the English or the French language may be used by any person in the debates of the Legislative Assembly of the Territories and in the proceedings before the courts; and both those languages shall be used in the records and journals of such Assembly” but allows the Assembly itself to make the territories unilingual, providing a specific formula is used:

[The Legislative] Assembly may, by ordinance or otherwise, regulate its proceedings, and the manner of recording and publishing the same; and the regulations so made shall be embodied in a proclamation which shall forthwith be made and published by the Lieutenant Governor in conformity with the law, and therefore shall have full force and effect.

- 1892: The territorial legislature votes in favour of a resolution “that it is desirable that the proceedings of the Legislative Assembly shall be recorded and published hereafter in the English Language only.” However, the resolution is never proclaimed by the lieutenant governor, as required by the amended wording of Section 110 of the Northwest Territories Act that had been adopted by the Parliament of Canada a year earlier. This is significant because it means that in the Northwest Territories and all of the successor jurisdictions that are carved out of it (Yukon in 1898, Alberta and Saskatchewan in 1905, and Nunavut in 1999), French retains, in theory at least, its legal status as a language of the legislature and courts, even though English is nearly universally assumed to be the only official language. In the 1980s, this will result in Alberta and Saskatchewan being declared officially bilingual by a decision of the Supreme Court of Canada.
- 1984: The territorial government responds to federal government pressure to make the territory officially bilingual (English and French only) by adopting the Official Languages Act, which English, French, and six aboriginal languages (amended, with the aboriginal languages redefined as nine, in 2003) into official languages of the territorial government. The law permits territorial residents to use any of these languages in territorial courts or in debates of the legislature, but documents are published in the aboriginal languages only when requested by the legislature, and laws are enacted only in English and French.

=== Nova Scotia ===
- 1710-1749: In 1710, Acadia is occupied by the British, and under the terms of Article XII of the Treaty of Utrecht, sovereignty is formally transferred from France to Britain in 1713. For the next four decades, the British retain only a limited presence in the colony, consisting of a few soldiers and merchants, and a transient fishing population. Therefore, “government was largely a matter of supervising the Acadians who constituted almost the entire population.... [The Acadians] disregarded official regulations and maintained a form of rudimentary self-rule.” This informal arrangement was possible because “[as] early as 1710 the Acadians had sent emissaries to deal with the new masters who, realizing the need for persons to receive and see to the execution of their orders, proceeded to regularize their election and functions.” On this basis, “it might be said that to that extent the French language continued to be recognized under the British.” Population Affected: Between 1710-1749, the French-speaking Acadian population grows from around 1,700 to about 10,000, and the English-speaking population grows from zero to about 2,500.
- 1749: Nova Scotia receives its first constitution, in the form of a Commission and Instructions to Governor Edward Cornwallis, meaning that the domestic law of England would govern the functioning of the courts. Because the use of all other languages, including French, had been banned in the courts of England in 1731, this means that in Nova Scotia, English becomes the only official language.
- 1755: Mass deportation of the Acadians takes place. Seven thousand Acadians are rounded up and expelled from the colony. Others flee to the woods or make their way overland to New France.
- 1758-1867: In 1758, Nova Scotia's first elections are held and the first Legislative Assembly is convened. No formal provisions exist as to the language of debate and of record, but mot Acadian have already been expelled and the rest are ineligible for office under the provisions of the anti-Catholic Test Act, which applies in Nova Scotia by virtue of the 1749 Commission applying English domestic law to Nova Scotia. Therefore, no French-speaking voters participate in the elections, and the question of using a language other than English never arises. “From the time of the first Legislative Assembly in 1758 to Confederation, not a single Nova Scotia statute is to be found conferring any legal recognition whatever on the French language. Only English has legal status.”

=== Ontario ===
For events prior to the creation of the Province of Upper Canada in 1791, see Quebec

- 1912: Regulation 17, which forbids the use of French as a language of instruction after the first year of school, unless the pupil is unable to speak English because of "defective training", and bans the teaching of French after the fourth year of school.
- 1917: Ottawa Separate School Trustees v. Mackell: The Judicial Committee of the Privy Council rules that in Ontario, only religious (Catholic) educational rights, not French language education rights, are covered by the constitutional protections under Section 93 of the British North America Act.
- 1927: Regulation 17 is repealed.
- 1968: The Education Act is amended to recognize French-language schools.
- 1970: a new post, Coordinator of Bilingualism, is created to oversee the development of French language government services. Over the next 16 years, a large number of service policies are adopted on a piecemeal basis by individual ministries.
- 1986: The legislature adopts the French Language Services Act, requiring that provincial government services be made available in French in any community or region where the francophone population exceeds 5,000 or 10 percent of the community's total population. In 1992, language author Richard Joy asserts that the Ontario language laws enacted in the 1980s "confer a semi-official status on the French language."
- 1988: The legislature enacts Bill 109, creating a French-language school board for Ottawa (which is home to about one quarter of the province's French-speaking population). When it starts to function in January 1989, the new school board operates fifty schools which formerly had been under the jurisdiction of pre-existing school boards, with a total student body of 12,500 elementary and 5,600 secondary students.
- 2000: A divisional court rules that the provincial government's plans to close Ottawa's French-language Montfort Hospital are unconstitutional because of an unwritten constitutional principle of minority rights found by the Supreme Court in its ruling on Reference re Secession of Quebec (1998). The government of Ontario criticizes the decision as judicial activism, and charges that "The divisional court decision has effectively rewritten the constitution to make Section 16.1 applicable to Ontario despite the express intention that it apply to New Brunswick alone." In 2001 a higher court upholds the ruling, and the provincial government abandons its plans to close the hospital.
- 2005: The City of Ottawa Act is amended to require the city to have a policy respecting the municipal administration of English and French. This stops short of a Liberal campaign promise to make the newly enlarged city officially bilingual and restricting the ability of the municipal council to alter its bilingual status.
- 2007: The Liberal government of Dalton McGuinty establishes the post of Commissioner of French Languages Services. Unlike the federal Commissioner of Official Languages Ontario's commissioner reports to a minister rather than being an officer of Parliament who reports directly to the legislature.

=== Prince Edward Island ===
- 1720-1759: The first settlers arrive from France in 1720. Prior to the British conquest of Île Saint-Jean in 1758, the island is home to a homogenous French-speaking population and is administered entirely in French. Following the great Acadian deportation of 1755, the island's Acadian population grows rapidly, to around 3,500 (many of whom were refugees fleeing the deportations in the Acadian heartland on the Bay of Fundy).
- 1758: British under Colonel Andrew Rollo capture Île Saint-Jean. About 3,500 Acadians are deported shortly thereafter, nearly depopulating the island. Only a few families, amounting to a little over two hundred individuals, are able to hide in cabins in the interior, or are allowed to stay by the British authorities.
- 1769: The colony of Prince Edward Island is created. The new colony's constitution in the form of a Commission and Instructions to its first Governor. These documents instruct the governor to follow the Nova Scotia model for judicial institutions, meaning that, as in Nova Scotia, the domestic law of England would govern the functioning of the courts. Because the use of all other languages, including French, had been banned in the courts of England in 1731, this means that in Prince Edward Island, English is the only official language. From this starting point, “no provisions governing the status of any language are to be found in the pre-Confederation statutes of Prince Edward Island.”

=== Quebec ===
- 1608-1759: Prior to the British conquest of Quebec in 1759, the European population in the most heavily populated part of what is now Quebec (primarily the St. Lawrence River valley) was a homogenous French-speaking community, and was administered entirely in French.
- 1760: The Articles of Capitulation, under which French resistance to the British occupiers ceases, are signed in Montreal. These articles provide the legal framework for the administration of the territory while it remains under British military rule (which lasts until 1763). Capitulation article no. 45 contains the first British acknowledgement of a formal role for the French language in its newly conquered territory. The British agree that legal documents of the ancien regime, including deeds, registers, and notarized documents, will retain legal force. Although no mention is made of the French language, "the British ... ensured continuity in the administration of justice by having available for consultation the precedents and records of the previous regime, all of them, of course, entirely in the French language."
- 1763: On October 7, King George III issues a Royal Proclamation establishing a colonial government for Quebec. The Proclamation gives legal expression to assimilationist policies. Although assimilation is primarily focused on replacing Catholicism with Protestantism, it has the practical consequence of denying rights on the basis of language. Since Catholics cannot take the necessary oath, they are excluded from participating in the new assembly of freeholders, from serving as officers of the new courts that are to be established, or even from practicing law. The practical consequence of this is to cause all justice to be administered by English-speakers. However, informal considerations make the restrictions on the use of French much less onerous than the letter of the law would suggest. Eugene Gosselin explains:

The British authorities did more than use French in their relations with their new subjects. They also used French as their own language of work and for correspondence. Nothing gave greater satisfaction to British pride than to be able to show a knowledge of French at least equal to what one would find among the best educated people in French Canada. Therefore the problem of language and culture did not constitute and could not constitute a political problem during the first ten or so years of the existence of the colony.

- 1764: Governor James Murray issues an ordinance modifying the restrictive rules regarding the administration of justice, to permit French-speaking Catholics to serve as lawyers in the Court of Common Pleas because "we have not yet got one English Barrister or Attorney [in Quebec] who understands the French Language." Murray's ordinance also allows French-speaking Catholics to serve on juries, because "As there are but Two Hundred Protestant Subjects in the Province ... it is thought unjust to exclude the new Roman Catholic Subjects to sit upon Juries, as such exclusion would constitute the said Two hundred Protestants perpetual Judges of the lives and Property of...Eighty Thousand of the new Subjects...." Murray asserts in a letter to his superiors in England that this is meant to be a "temporary Expedient" until he receives clearer instructions, but in practice, French-speaking juries and lawyers exist from this point forward.
- 1764: The Quebec Gazette is published for the first time on June 21. This publication contains public ordinances and subordinate legislation (regulations) in both English and French. From this point forward, all such information has never ceased to be available in published form in both languages, in the successor governments to the one then governing Quebec.
- 1768: Governor Guy Carleton hires a secretary to translate all laws and orders of the governor and council into French. This provides a permanent formalization of the process of bilingual publication that had been undertaken by the Quebec Gazette four years earlier.
- 1774: The Quebec Act is adopted. Although it contains nothing specific on language, the Act ends the legal exclusion of French Canadians from participating in government on the basis of religion (the Test Oath being replaced with a simple Oath of allegiance to the Crown). From this point forward, French-speaking Catholics begin to participate in some of the functions of the civil government. French Canadians participate when the first session of the colony's new Legislative Council in 1777. As well, from the very start debates in the Legislative Council take place in both French and English, and both languages are used for its records. The absence of specific mention, in the Quebec Act, of reference to the use of French in the courts or in government is probably due to the fact that informal arrangements had already been made, under Governor Carleton's administration, for Canadian lawyers to plead cases in French and to use either language in written procedures. As well, ordinances were already being published in both languages.
- 1793: Following the adoption of Constitutional Act in 1791, the Parliament of Lower Canada meets and debates the question of language. The House of Assembly of Lower Canada resolves that the Speaker ought to be bilingual, that MPPs ought to be free to speak French or English, that the language of civil law be French and that of criminal law be English. This was overruled by Westminster which decided that only the English text should have legal value but could be translated to French.
- 1834: Resolution 75 of the Ninety-Two Resolutions of the House of Assembly of Lower Canada complains of the disproportion in the offices held by natives of the British Isles vs natives of Canada.
- 1838: During the Lower Canada Rebellion of 1837/38, Patriote rebels, led by Robert Nelson issue a Declaration of Independence of Lower Canada, containing eighteen “solemn declarations” which are intended to form the basis of an eventual national constitution. Declaration #18: “That the French and English languages shall be used in all public affairs.”
- 1840: The Act of Union is adopted. Section 41 of the Act bans the French language from Parliament and Courts of the new united Province of Canada.
- 1848: Article 41 of the Act of Union is amended. In a return to the situation that had existed from 1792 to 1837 in Lower Canada, it is once again legal to use the French language in the Parliament and in the Courts.
- 1857: Section 15 of the Act respecting the Codification of the Laws of Lower Canada relative to Civil Matters and Procedure requires that the Civil Code of Lower Canada be printed only in bilingual form, with English and French displayed on the same page: “[T]he two texts, when printed, shall stand side by side.” Side-by-side publication is a first step towards the adoption of the "Equal Authenticity Rule" for interpreting bilingual statutes.
- 1866: The Legislative Assembly of the Province of Canada enacts the Civil Code of Lower Canada. This law code, which will remain in effect in the post-Confederation Province of Quebec until 1994, includes Canada's first explicit rule for the judicial interpretation of statutes that have been drafted in both English and French. Article 2615 of the Code reads as follows:

If in any article of this code founded on the laws existing at the time of its promulgation there shall be a difference between the English and French texts, that version shall prevail which is the most consistent with the provisions of the existing laws on which the article is founded; and if there be any such difference in an article changing the existing laws, that version shall prevail which is the most consistent with the intention of the article, and the ordinary rules of legal interpretation shall apply in determining such intention.

- 1867: Section 133 of the British North America Act decrees that "The Acts of … the Legislature of Quebec shall be printed and published in both those Languages [ie. in both English and French]", and mandates the use of both French and English for legislative debates, publications of the legislature, and provincial courts. This set of provisions is identical to that used the federal parliament and courts. These rules apply only to the new province of Quebec and not to any of the other provinces, which continue to operate in English only.
- 1891: CPR v. Robinson: The Supreme Court of Canada introduces for the first time the rule of judicial interpretation that will come to be known as the “Equal Authenticity Rule”. This rule of interpretation holds that section 133 of the Constitution Act, 1867 imposes an obligation upon the courts to treat “both [the English and French] versions of statutes [as] equally valid and authoritative interpretations of the law,” even if the statute in question was clearly drafted in one language and translated into the other, and even if the two versions of the law are incompatible. The case revolved around the inconsistent wording of the English and French versions of the Civil Code of Quebec, and hence applied only acts of the Quebec legislature. But it was an implication of the decision that the same rule must apply to acts of the Parliament of Canada. This implication would be enforced by the Supreme Court in its 1935 ruling in R. v. DuBois.
- 1910: The Liberal government of Lomer Gouin enacts what came to be known as the La Vergne Law, which requires the use of French alongside English on documents such as utility bills and transportation tickets.
- 1956: The Tremblay Commission, an inquiry established by the provincial government of Maurice Duplessis, publishes its report. The report deals primarily with constitutional issues, but also makes recommendations for the creation of a provincial agency to monitor and regulate the quality of French in Quebec,
- 1961: The Liberal government of Jean Lesage establishes the Office de la langue française ("Office of the French language"). Its mandate is "to align on international French, promote good Canadianisms and fight Anglicisms, [...] work on the normalization of the language in Québec and support state intervention to carry out a global language policy that would consider notably the importance of socio-economic motivations in making French the priority language in Québec."
- 1968: The Union Nationale government of Jean-Jacques Bertrand establishes the Commission of Inquiry on the Situation of the French Language and Linguistic Rights in Quebec (better known as the “Gendron Commission”). The commission completes its report in 1973, recommending that the provincial government enact laws to make French “the common language of Quebecers” and the sole official language of Quebec.
- 1969: The Union Nationale government of Jean-Jacques Bertrand enacts Bill 63, which confirms the status quo on the language of instruction in the public schools (Parents can choose English or French).
- 1974: The Liberal government of Robert Bourassa enacts Bill 22, making Quebec officially unilingual, with French as its only official language. English retains a proscribed legal status.
- 1977: The Parti Québécois government of René Lévesque enacts the Charter of the French Language (better known as "Bill 101"), banning the use of all languages but French on commercial signs, requiring that French be the language of the workplace, and placing further restrictions on the ability of parents to place their children in English-language schools.
- 1979: Attorney General of Quebec v. Blaikie (No. 1): The Supreme Court of Canada rules that the parts of Quebec's Charter of the French Language stating that provincial laws will be enacted in French only, violates section 133 of the Constitution Act, 1867. The Court finds that section 133, which requires that all Acts be printed and published in both French and English, means in practice that all provincial legislation and regulations must be enacted in both languages, and that the English text of any law is of equal weight to the French text.
- 1981: Quebec (Attorney General) v. Blaikie (No. 2): Following an application from the Quebec government to determine whether there exist any exceptions to the requirement, under section 133 of the Constitution Act, 1867, that all laws be printed and published in English as well as in French, the Supreme Court of Canada rules that the section 133 requirements do not extend to bylaws enacted by Quebec municipalities.
- 1982: The Parti Québécois government of René Lévesque enacts a law inserting the "Notwithstanding Clause" into all existing Quebec legislation, thereby causing the Charter of Rights to be largely inoperative in Quebec. However, the Lévesque government is unable to prevent section 23 of the Charter from applying to Quebec, as the "Notwithstanding Clause" has been drafted to apply only to certain parts of the Charter, excluding this part.
- 1984: The Parti Québécois government of René Lévesque enacts Bill 3, a law to divide the province's schools based upon language rather than the traditional division based upon religion. A year later, the law is struck down by the Superior Court of Quebec. The decision is not appealed by the government, effectively ending this initiative.
- 1984: Attorney General of Quebec v. Quebec Protestant School Boards: The Supreme Court of Canada rules that as a result of the recent adoption of the Charter of Rights, it is no longer constitutional for the Charter of the French Language to deny an education in English to the child of any parent who was educated in English in any Canadian province (provincial law had previously permitted this only for children of parents educated in English in Quebec).
- 1986: MacDonald v. City of Montreal: The Supreme Court of Canada rules that Section 133 of the Constitution Act, 1867 establishes only a negative right to use either official language in the Quebec legislature and its institutions, and does not extend to a right to have municipal services in English as well as French.
- 1987: The 1982 law inserting the Notwithstanding Clause into all Quebec laws is allowed to lapse by the Liberal government of Robert Bourassa, and all Quebec laws therefore become subject to the Charter of Rights.
- 1988: Ford v. Quebec (A.G.): The Supreme Court of Canada rules that the commercial sign law provisions of Bill 101, are unconstitutional. The Quebec government reacts by An Act to Amend the Charter of the French Language (better known as “Bill 178”), which re-enacts the unconstitutional provisions under the authority of the "Notwithstanding Clause".
- 1988: Devine v. Quebec (Attorney General): The Supreme Court of Canada rules that it would be a constitutionally permissible restriction on freedom of speech for the Quebec government to require that French be “markedly predominant” on commercial signs, as long as other languages are not actually banned.
- 1989: Greater Montreal Protestant School Board v. Quebec: The Supreme Court of Canada rules that language rights which are not included in the Charter of Rights should be interpreted less generously than those which have Charter protection.
- 1993: The Liberal government of Robert Bourassa enacts An Act to Amend the Charter of the French Language (better known as “Bill 86”), amending the sign law to bring it into conformity with the Supreme Court rulings in Ford v. Quebec (A.G.) and Devine v. Quebec (A.G.), by allowing other languages on commercial signs, subject to French being "markedly predominant".
- 1993: Ballantyne, Davidson, McIntyre v. Canada: A human rights tribunal of the United Nations finds Quebec's restrictions on commercial signs in languages other than French to be an unwarranted restriction, under the terms of articles 2, 19, 26 and 27 of the International Covenant on Civil and Political Rights on freedom of expression in the pursuit of a legitimate objective (strengthening the position of the French language). The ruling is not enforceable.
- 1997: An amendment to the Constitution provides for linguistic rather than confessional (Catholic and Protestant) school boards in Quebec.
- 2002: A.G. of Quebec (Procureur Général) c. John Reid et Frances Muriel Reid: The Quebec Court of Appeal rules that the Quebec government cannot require Quebec-based websites to conform with provincial language law, because the internet falls under federal jurisdiction.
- 2002: The legislature enacts Bill 104, An Act to amend the Charter of the French Language. This law amends section 73 of the Charter to limit the ability of parents to get around the Charter's requirement that they send their children to school in French. Some parents had been enrolling their children in private English-language schools for short periods of time, thereby meeting the technical hurdle needed to allow the child to be enrolled permanently in an English-language school. Section 73 was amended to require that the "major part" of the instruction received by the child had been in English, in order to allow that child to receive a publicly funded English-language education.
- 2005: Solski (Tutor of) v. Quebec (Attorney General): The Supreme Court of Canada rules that the "major part" requirement in section 73 of the Charter of the French Language, which had been added to the Charter under 2002's Bill 104, violates subsection 23(2) of the Canadian Charter of Rights and Freedoms. The Court does not strike down the law, but presents the province with a set of criteria for bringing the law into conformity with the Charter of Rights.

=== Saskatchewan ===
For events prior to the creation of the province 1905, see Northwest Territories

- 1905: Under the provisions of the Saskatchewan Act, the new province of Saskatchewan is carved out of the Northwest Territories. Section 16 of the Saskatchewan Act calls for the continuation within the new province of all existing Northwest Territories legislation. Therefore, because the Northwest Territories legislature had voted in 1892 to make that English the only official language for that territory, Saskatchewan comes into existence as an officially unilingual jurisdiction.
- 1931: The legislature enacts the School Act, which declares English to be the sole language of instruction in Saskatchewan's public schools.
- 1967: The first of three amendments to the provincial Education Act (the second and third taking place in 1973 and 1978, respectively) reintroducing French-language instruction. By the end of this decade-long process, French can again be used in Saskatchewan as the principal language of instruction, opening up the possibility of schools specifically for francophone students. As well, immersion schools are now possible.
- 1988: R. v. Mercure. The Supreme Court of Canada rules that Saskatchewan is legally obligated to enact all laws in both French and English, but that this obligation may be altered or repealed by a 'clear legislative pronouncement' of the provincial legislature.
- 1988: In response to the ruling in R. v. Mercure, the provincial legislature enacts the Language Act. This law declares all existing laws valid, even if enacted in English only, but provides that limited French-language rights will apply within the judicial system.
- 1990: The provincial government establishes the Office of French Language Coordination (later renamed the Francophone Affairs Branch), "to assist provincial government ministries, crown corporations and agencies in providing more services in French to the Francophone community."
- 1993: The Education Act is amended to permit francophones to manage their own schools.

=== Yukon ===
For events prior to the creation of the territory in 1898, see Northwest Territories

- 1898: By an Act of Parliament, the Yukon Territory is created out of territory formerly under the jurisdiction of the Northwest Territories. Section 9 of the Yukon Territory Act states that “the laws relating to civil and criminal matters and the ordinances as the same exist in the North-west Territories at the time of the passing of this Act, shall be and remain in force in the said Yukon Territory in so far as applicable thereto until amended or repealed....” Therefore, because the Northwest Territories legislature had voted in 1892 to make that English the only official language for that territory, the Yukon comes into existence as an officially unilingual jurisdiction.

== See also ==
- Official bilingualism in Canada
- Official Languages Act (Canada)
- Languages of Canada
- Language policies of Canada's provinces and territories (for present-day policies)
