= Language policies of Canada's provinces and territories =

Language policies in Canada

Across Canada's provinces and territories, language policies vary. Although the federal government operates as an officially bilingual institution, providing services in English and French, several provincial governments have also instituted or legislated their own language policies.

From the 1890s until the 1960s, English was the only language in which most government services were provided outside of Quebec (which was functionally bilingual) and using French in the courts or in schools was often illegal. These developments led to fears by French-Canadian nationalists that French speakers would be assimilated into the increasingly Anglophone culture of Ontario, leading the Royal Commission on Bilingualism and Biculturalism (1963–1969) to recommend that the Government of Canada and all provinces offer more services in French.

Since that time, Quebec has used provincial law to encourage the use of French (see Charter of the French Language) ahead of other languages, while the other provinces have begun to offer more and more services in French and in other languages besides English, including aboriginal languages and immigrant languages. The 1982 amendments to the Constitution of Canada included a right of minority-language education that has resulted in policy changes in all of the provinces. Quebec is unique in requiring private businesses to use French and requiring immigrants to send their children to French-language schools. In other provinces there is no requirement that businesses use a particular language, but English predominates, and immigrants may send their children to English, French or third-language schools.

== History (before 1982) ==
At the time of Confederation in 1867, English and French were made the official languages of debate in the Parliament of Canada and the Parliament of Quebec. No specific policies were enacted for the other provinces, and no provisions were made for the official languages to be used in other elements of the government such the courts, schools, post offices, and so on. The official language policies of the provinces and territories were initially set when they were created by the federal government, or in the case of provinces that were separate colonies before joining Confederation (Newfoundland, Prince Edward Island, and British Columbia) were inherited from their own histories. Language policies in all provinces have evolved over time in response to changing demographics, public attitudes, and legal rulings.

=== The Prairies ===
Map of Rupert's Land. Prior to its transfer to Canada in 1869, English was a minority language in that region.

Prior to becoming part of Canada in 1869, English was a minority language in the Prairies, where French and Aboriginal languages were more common. The arrival of settlers from Ontario, the British Isles, and the United States changed the demographic balance, however. One of the outcomes of the Red River Rebellion of 1870 was the creation of Manitoba as an officially bilingual province, to protect the French-speaking Métis from being overpowered by the incoming English-speaking settlers. This guarantee failed, however, and in the aftermath of the Manitoba Schools Question, that province was allowed to become officially English-only, until these policies were declared unconstitutional in 1985.

The Northwest Territories Act of 1891 made English and French official languages in the rest of the Canadian West. But in 1892 the Legislature of the Northwest Territories declared itself English-only.

This trend continued to the creation of the new provinces of Alberta and Saskatchewan in 1905, and beyond.

By the time Alberta was made a province in 1905, the French language had been dealt a series of aggressive blows, and the use of French in government, the courts and schools was made illegal.

— Alberta Online Encyclopedia

== Effect of the Charter on the provinces and territories ==
Section Twenty-three of the Canadian Charter of Rights and Freedoms guarantees that Canadian-born or educated parents (not recent immigrants) have a right to educate their children in their choice of either French or English wherever there are "sufficient numbers". This was a major change in that education is normally considered solely provincial jurisdiction, and policy had been majoritarian. Court cases such as Doucet-Boudreau v Nova Scotia (Minister of Education) have indicated that this is a positive right that demands timely and sufficient action from the provincial governments.

== Officially bilingual or multilingual provinces/territories ==
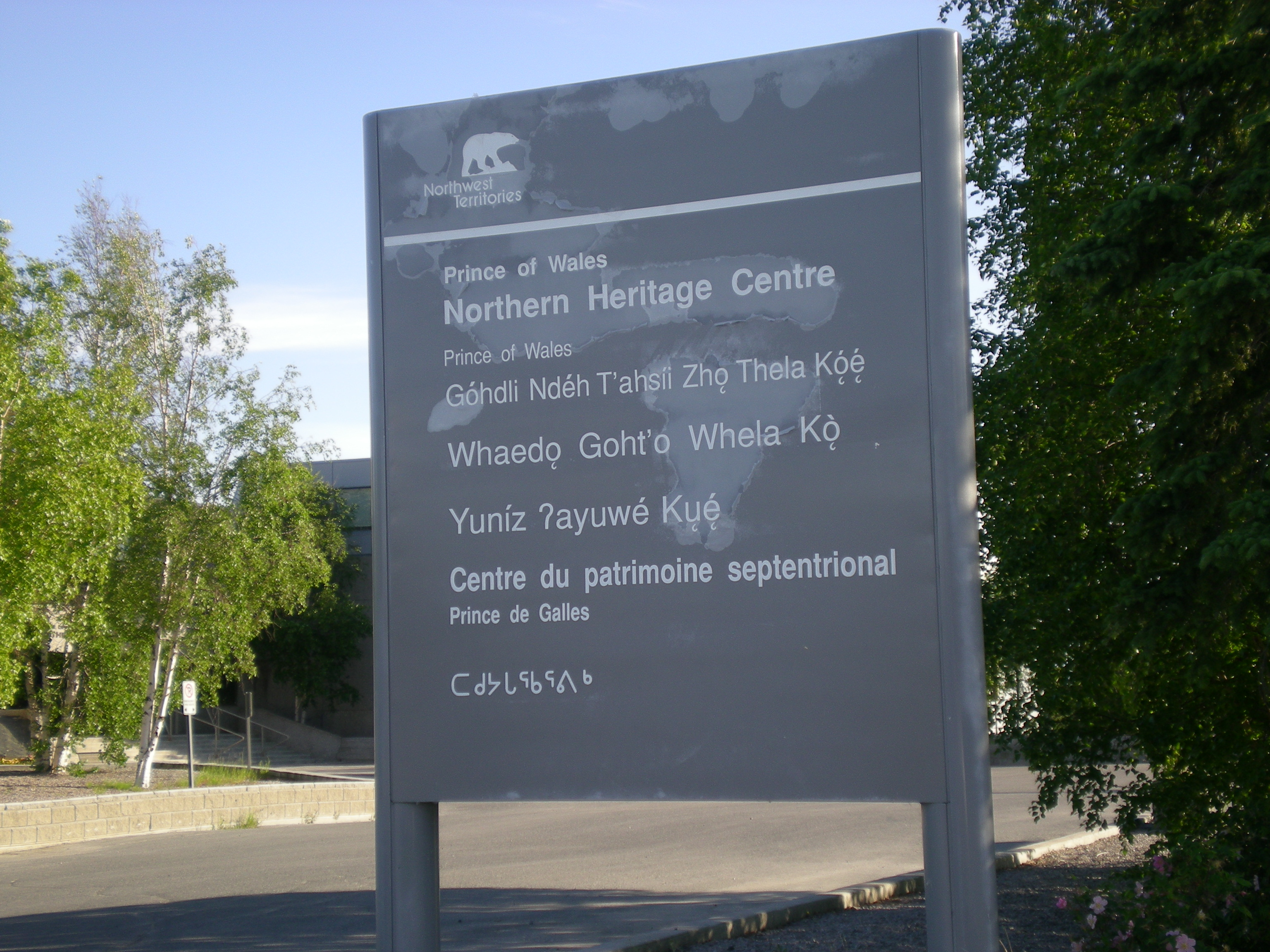
Signage at the Prince of Wales Northern Heritage Centre in the Northwest Territories featuring several of the territory's official languages

In addition to the federal government, English and French are formally the official languages of the provinces of Manitoba and New Brunswick, and in all three territories. In addition to English and French, Nunavut and the Northwest Territories have additional languages legislated as official languages.

However, New Brunswick remains the only province whose provincial government is able to provide equal access to services for either official languages. In the other cases, the recognition sometimes amounts to a formal recognition of official languages, but limited services in official languages other than English. Manitoba was officially bilingual at its creation, became officially Anglophone only, but this was later reversed by the courts.

=== The territories ===
- Northwest Territories: Chipewyan, Cree, English, French, Gwich’in, Inuinnaqtun, Inuktitut, Inuvialuktun, North Slavey, South Slavey, and Tłįchǫ or Dogrib.
- Nunavut: English, Inuktitut, Inuinnaqtun, and French.
- Yukon: English and French.

=== New Brunswick ===
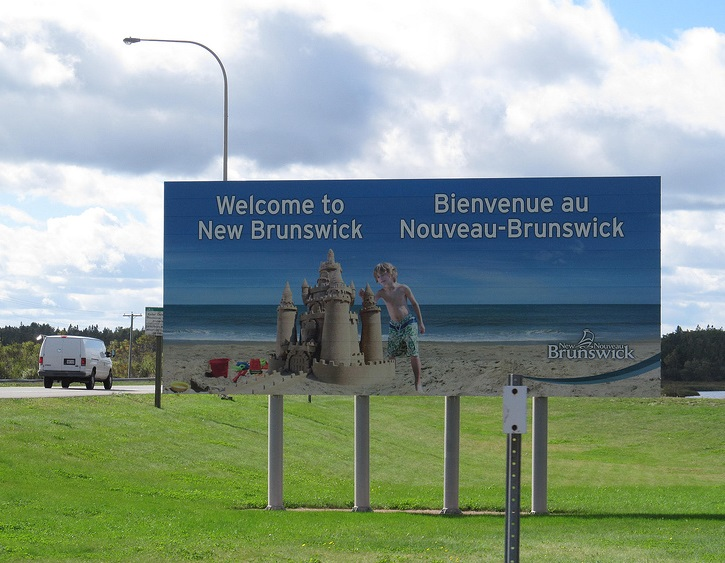
A bilingual welcome sign for New Brunswick. The province is one of only two bilingual provinces in Canada.

New Brunswick has been officially bilingual in English and French since the passing of the New Brunswick Official Languages Act (1969). This was complemented by An Act Recognizing the Equality of the Two Official Linguistic Communities in New Brunswick in 1981. New Brunswick's bilingualism was constitutionally enshrined in the Canadian Charter of Rights and Freedoms in 1982. The Charter was amended in 1993 to clarify that the two language communities are legally equal. In 1999 the Supreme Court of Canada ruled in Moncton (City) v. Charlebois that New Brunswick's official bilingualism also applied to municipalities in the province. In 2002 the Official Languages Act became New Brunswick's new language law, leading to the creation of the Office of the Commissioner of Official Languages for New Brunswick in 2003.

=== Manitoba ===
Manitoba stands out amongst the provinces as a province with a small Francophone linguistic minority but above-average constitutional protection of this minority.

When Manitoba was established, section 23 of the Manitoba Act, 1870 provided that English or French could be used in the courts and the Legislative Assembly, and that all provincial acts had to be enacted in both languages. However, in 1890, the provincial government passed the Official Language Act by which Manitoba became English-only. Nearly a century later, the Supreme Court of Canada held, in Reference Re Manitoba Language Rights, that this legislation was unconstitutional. The province of Manitoba is now overwhelmingly English-speaking and the first language of the courts, government ministries, and schools is English. In order to comply with the court's ruling, the provincial legislature is required to enact all of its statutes in both languages and both languages can be used in the Legislative Assembly and the courts. The provincial government has gone beyond the requirements of s. 23 and the Supreme Court decision and now provides government services in both languages, as summarized in the French Language Services Policy, last updated in March 1999.

== Regionalized bilingualism: Ontario ==
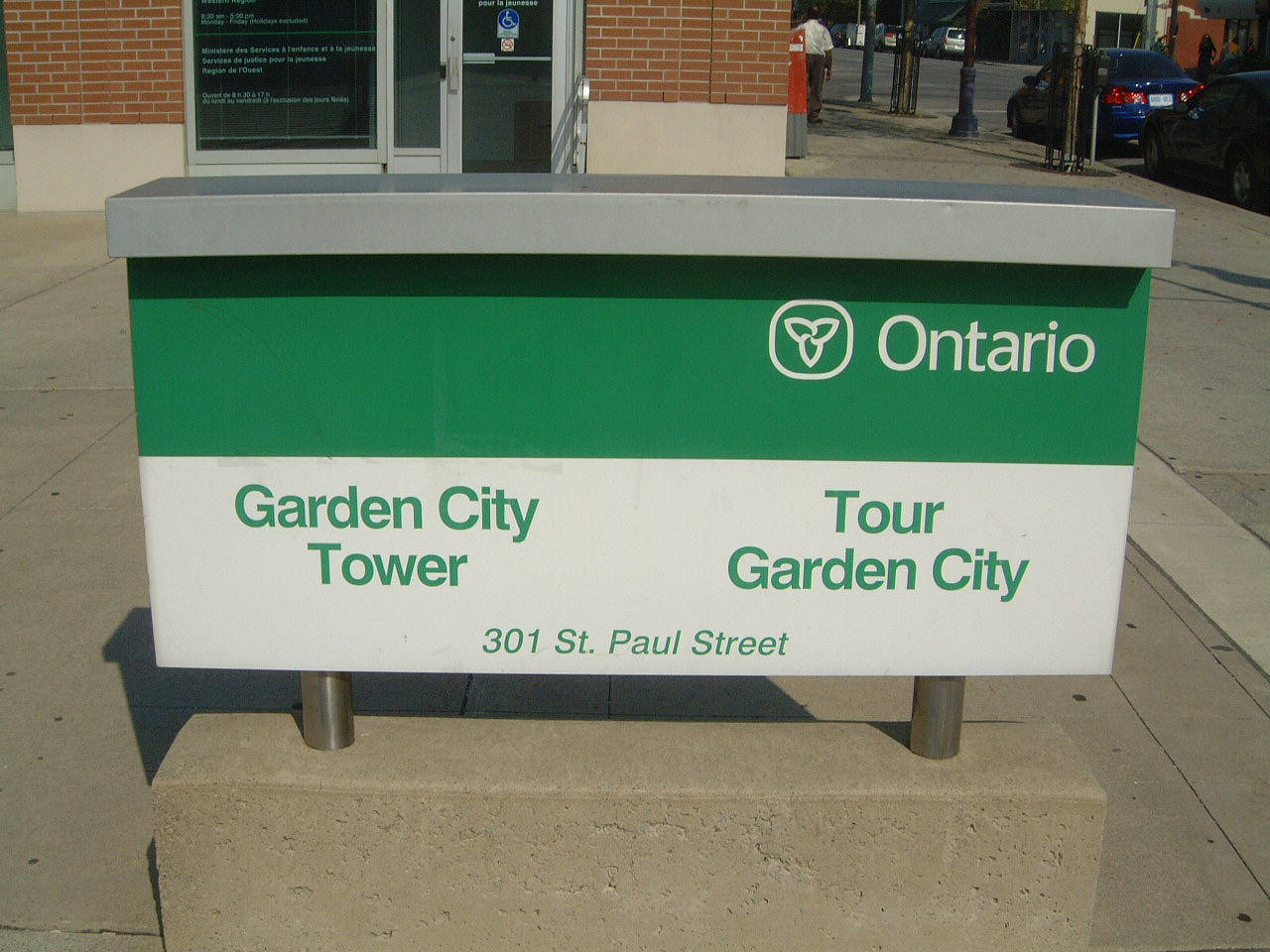
A bilingual sign for the Ministry of Transportation of Ontario building in St. Catharines. Provincial services may be accessed in French or English in designated areas under the French Language Services Act.

Ontario has a regionalized language policy, where part of the province is English-only and other areas are bilingual. Province-wide services (such as websites and toll-free telephone numbers) are provided in both English and French. However individuals only have a right to French-language services in certain designated regions of the province under the French Language Services Act (1986). There are 26 regions so designated. These are: areas with 10% or more Francophones; urban centres with 5,000 or more Francophones; and areas previously designated by the Government of Ontario between 1978 and 1985. Notably this includes Toronto, the provincial capital and Canada's largest municipality (although not all of the regional municipalities of the GTA are included), and the National Capital Region including Ottawa, as well as many other cities, counties, districts, townships, and towns. For the purposes of the policy, the definition of a "Francophone" was broadened in 2009. Previously it included only mother-tongue speakers, however it now includes allophones (people whose first language is neither French or English) who "have particular knowledge of French as an official language and use French at home, including many recent immigrants to Ontario for whom French is the language of integration".

However, Ontario's legislature and judicial systems are officially bilingual, with French made an official language of the legislature in 1970, and the judiciary in 1984. The official languages of the provincial courts was set in s. 125 of the Courts of Justice Act, with s. 126 of the same act outlining the specific rights afforded to a French-speaking party. French-language access within Ontario's judicial administrative offices is also required in designated communities under the French Language Services Act. In addition to section 23 of the Canadian Charter of Rights and Freedoms, French-language rights for resident elementary and secondary school students in Ontario are afforded through its provincial Education Act.

== Officially French-only: Quebec ==
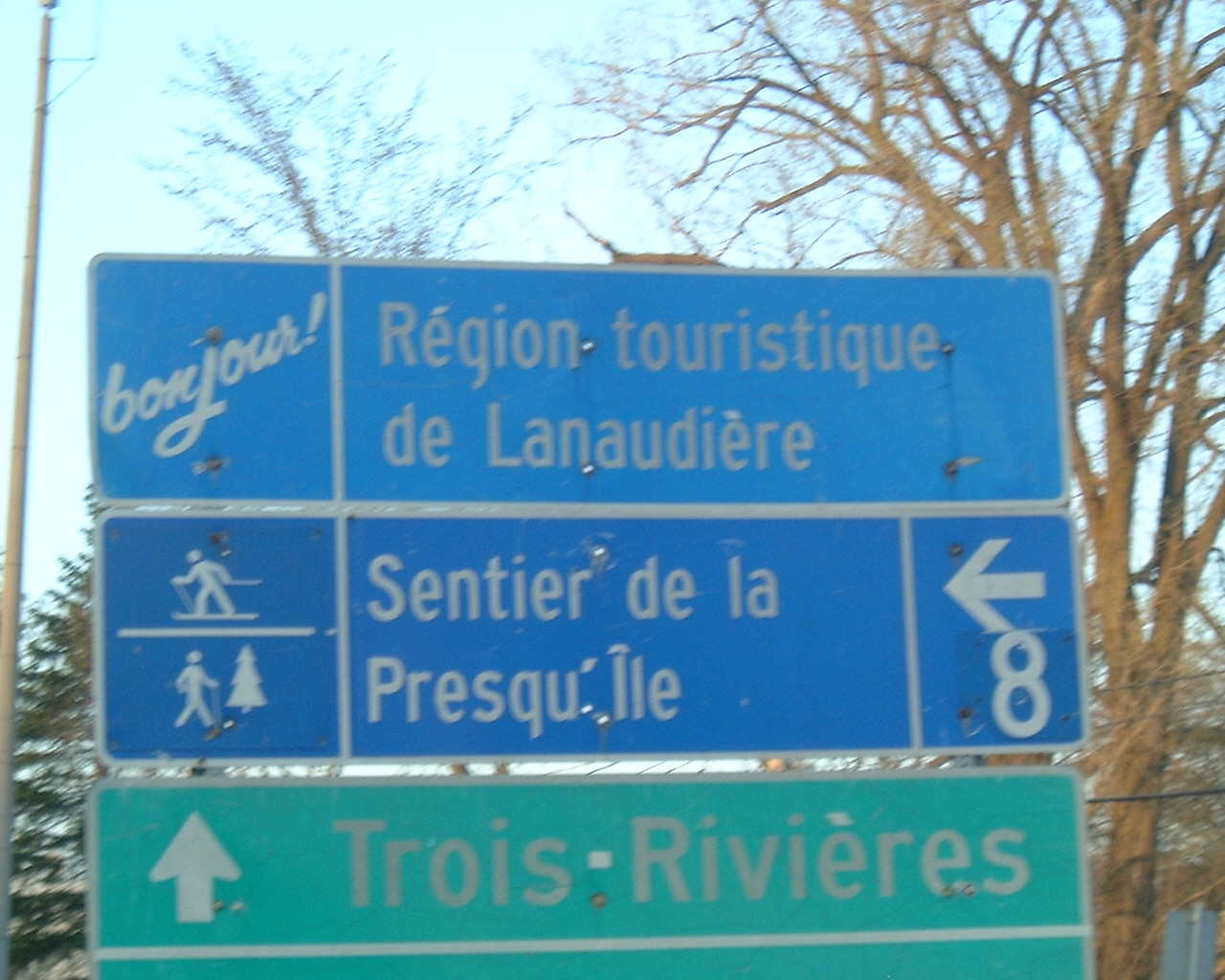
A French-language road sign in Repentigny, Quebec. French was named the official language of the province under the Official Language Act

Until 1969, Quebec was the only officially bilingual province in Canada and most public institutions functioned in both languages. English was also used in the legislature, government commissions and courts. An Act to promote the French language in Québec was passed in 1969 by the Union Nationale government of Jean-Jacques Bertrand. It required the education ministry to ensure that French as a second language was taught to all English-speakers and immigrants in Quebec, but allowed Quebecers freedom of choice in deciding in which language to educate their children. This was considered too weak by many Quebec nationalists, leading to the creation of the Mouvement Québec français and increased support for the new Parti Québécois.

From 1968 to 1973, the Commission of Inquiry on the Situation of the French Language and Linguistic Rights in Quebec investigated how to strengthen the position of French in Quebec. Its recommendations led to the passage of the Official Language Act or "Bill 22" in 1974 by the Quebec Liberal Party government of Robert Bourassa. This made French the sole official language of Quebec and required its use in business.

Bill 22 was replaced by the Charter of the French Language (Bill 101) by Quebec's National Assembly in August 1977, under the Parti Québécois government led by René Lévesque. It is structured as a list of rights, where everyone in Quebec has the right to be served in French by the government and businesses, and also provides rights for speakers of English and aboriginal languages. Most government services are available in both French and English. Regional institutions in the Nunavik region of northern Quebec offer services in Inuktitut and Cree.

Several legal challenges have been raised against Bill 101 in the ongoing legal dispute over Quebec's language policy. In 1988, the Supreme Court of Canada ruled in Ford v Quebec (AG) that the ban on outdoor signs in languages other than French was unconstitutional. The government of Quebec choose to invoke the "notwithstanding clause" to shield the legislation from the courts. The United Nations Commission on Human Rights ruled similarly in Ballantyne v Canada in 1993. The ban on non-French signs was lifted with the passage of Bill 86 in 1993.

On May 24 2022, Quebec's French Language Bill 96 was adopted, with 78 MNAs in favour (from the CAQ and Québec solidaire) and 29 against (from the Liberal Party and Parti Québécois).

== Officially English with services in French and other languages ==
Most provinces have laws that make either English or both English and French the official language(s) of the legislature and the courts, but may also have separate policies in regards to education and the bureaucracy.

=== Alberta ===
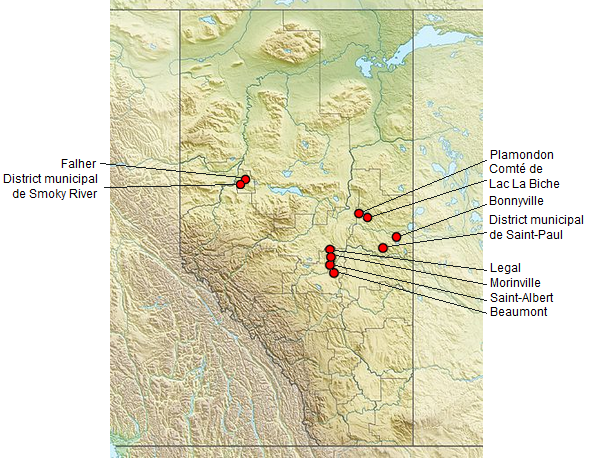
Map of Alberta Bilingual Municipalities Association (ABMA) communities. The ABMA communities provide services in English and French, although are not required to do so.

Alberta inherited its English-only status from the Northwest Territories in 1905, and this was strengthened over time. The Languages Act (1988), reaffirmed the unilingual English nature of the province, while recognizing a right to use French in the Legislative Assembly of Alberta and before certain courts. The Language Policy in Education (1978) requires school boards to establish French programs at the request of a local advisory committee. The Schools Act recognizes a right to instruction in French for the official language minority (1988) and right of Francophones to manage their own schools (1993). Laws may be drafted solely in English and there is no legal requirement that they be translated into French. French may be used orally in all provincial courts in Alberta. There is no requirement that healthcare services be provided in French, and it is left up to the initiative of individual hospitals and clinics. There is no requirement that social services be provided in French and this is left up to individual NGOs and charities that work with the provincial government. Other government services are provided in English only, except where the provincial government sees a need for French, including tourism and immigration, or where the federal government has provided funding. There is no official policy requiring municipalities in Alberta to provide services in French, but the Alberta Bilingual Municipalities Network includes the communities of Beaumont, Legal, Falher, Plamondon, Morinville, St. Albert, St. Paul, Bonnyville and the Smoky River Municipal District. Since 1993 there have been distinct separate and public Francophone school boards in Alberta in addition to the existing public and separate school boards which also offer French immersion. Besides French the government does not offer most services in many other languages, but there are exceptions. Official government toll-free lines related subjects like family violence and gambling are available in 170 languages. The government publishes an educational curriculum to assists teachers of Chinese, German, Italian, Japanese, Latin, Punjabi, Spanish, and Ukrainian, as well as of Cree and Blackfoot.

In June 2017 the province unveiled a new French Policy aimed at improving services for Franco-Albertans. The province maintains a partial French version of its website, bonjour.alberta.ca.

=== Nova Scotia ===
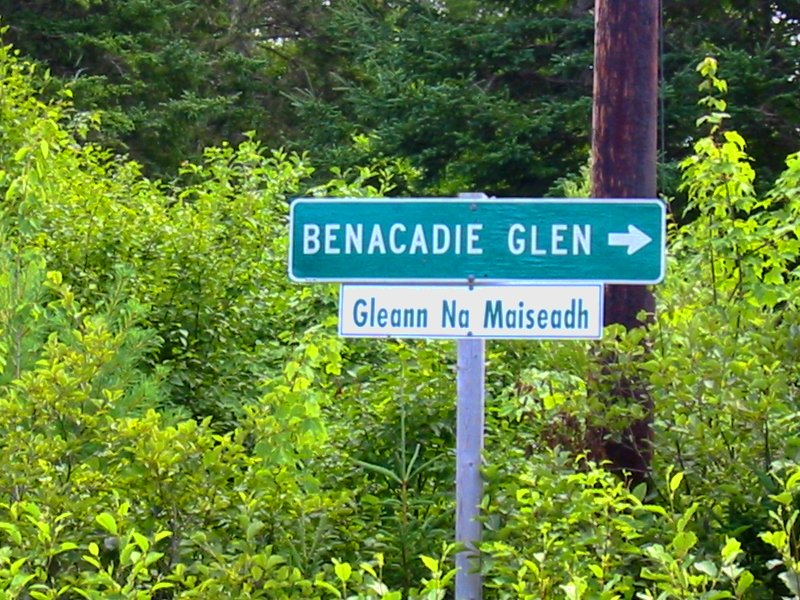
A bilingual English and Canadian Gaelic road sign in Nova Scotia. The province has attempted to support the language through the Office of Gaelic Affairs.

Nova Scotia had no legal requirement to provide any services in a language other than English, which was already well-established as the official language when the province joined Confederation in 1867. However the province has an Office of Gaelic Affairs whose mission is "to work with Nova Scotians in the renewal of Gaelic language and culture in the Province" and an Office of Acadian Affairs:

to offer advice and support to provincial government departments, offices, agencies and Crown corporations so that they can develop and adapt policies, programs, and services that reflect the needs of the Acadian and francophone community.

— Office of Acadian Affairs

The province also maintains a French-language web portal, gov.ns.ca/bonjour

=== Prince Edward Island ===
During the first half of the 20th century, there were 60 French language schools in Prince Edward Island. However, due to a consolidation of the school system, the number of French schools declined to only one by the late 70s. A second school opened in 1980 and, 20 years later, three new French schools opened in the province.

— http://www.gov.pe.ca/focus/segment.php3?number=813

The French Language School Board was created on July 1, 1990. This was followed by the opening of new French-language school in Summerside-Miscouche, West Prince, and Rustico in 2000, and Souris in 2003. The Francophone Affairs Division was established on April 1, 1989. Under the French Language Services Act (2000), Prince Edward Island made a variety of mostly non-binding commitments to provide services in French, but according to a government report (as of 2005), many sections of the Act have not proclaimed into law, as the province is still in the process of building its capacity to deliver services in French.

=== Saskatchewan ===
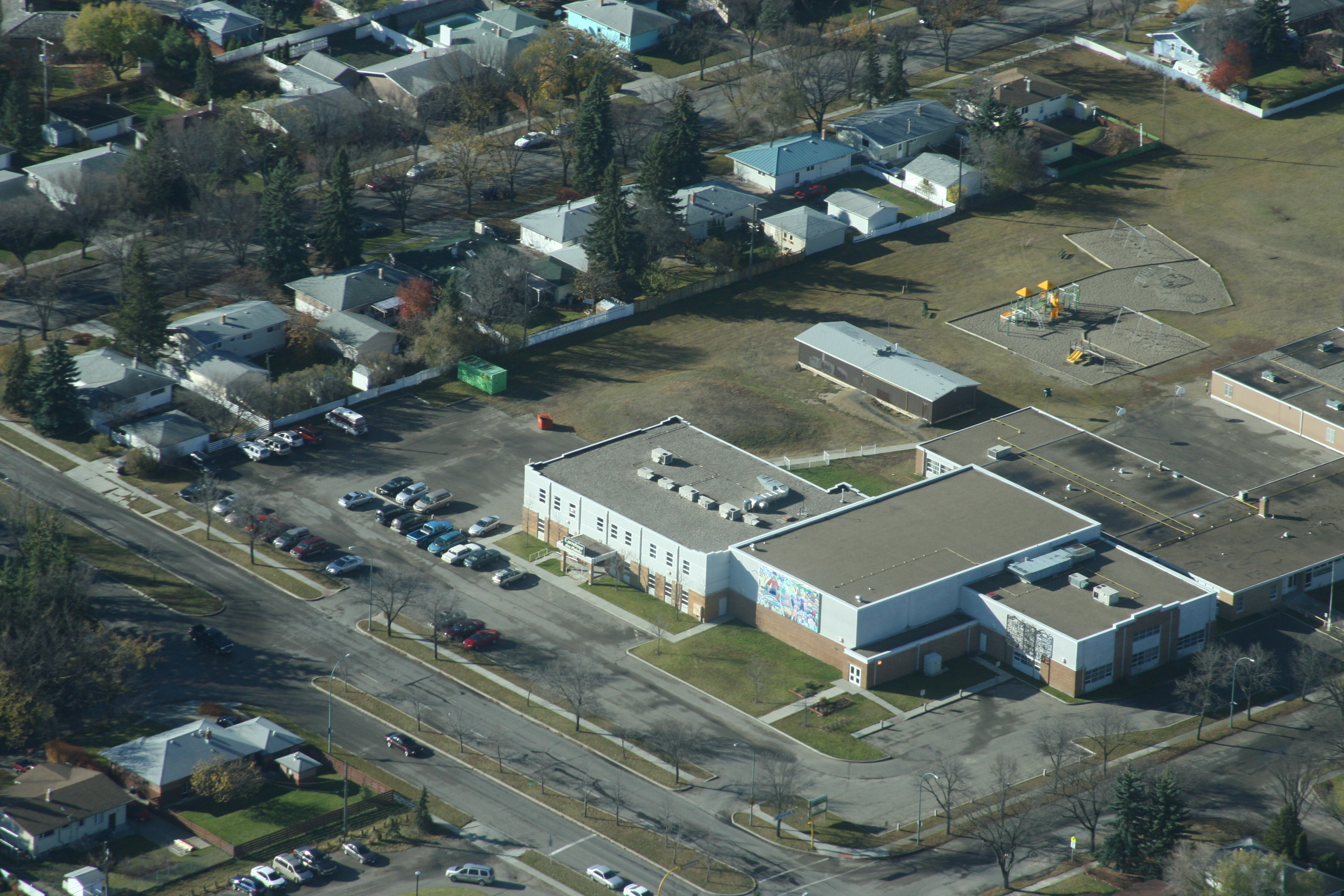
Aerial view of École monseigneur de Laval, a public francophone elementary school in Saskatchewan. French has been permitted as an instructional language in Saskatchewan's public schools since 1968.

In Saskatchewan, a 1968 amendment to the School Act permitted the establishment of designated French schools. Prior to this date, English was the only language which could be used as a language of instruction in Saskatchewan schools. The Language Act

provides that all acts and regulations can be enacted, printed and published in English or in English and French. The Act also provides that both English and French may be used in the Legislative Assembly and in Saskatchewan courts. However, the rules of court must be in both languages.

— - Ministry of Justice and Attorney General of Saskatchewan.

In 2010, the Government of Saskatchewan launched a bilingual website that indexes all the services it provides in French: bonjour.gov.sk.ca

== De facto English only ==
=== British Columbia ===
Access to French-language education in British Columbia is determined not only by Charter rights under Section 23, but also by a provincial policy decision to extend French-language schooling to francophone non-citizens living in British Columbia. There are 59 regional English language school boards in the province and one province-wide francophone board. There is one French language college (Educacentre College), no French-language universities but some French-medium instruction at Simon Fraser University.

Outside of education, there is no legal framework for minority language services by the civil service or the courts.

=== Newfoundland and Labrador ===
Many Aboriginal and European languages were once widely spoken in Newfoundland and Labrador. However, Britain eventually gained firm and unchallenged control of the island and adjacent coast following the French defeat in the Seven Years' War, and English then became the language of administration and commerce, as in most of the British Empire. In isolated fishing villages many minority languages persisted in private use, however, until the coming of standardized education in the 19th, and more so the 20th centuries. When Newfoundland joined Confederation in 1949 it had already used English as the sole language of government for several centuries. Today, Newfoundland is the most linguistically homogeneous province in Canada. In 1999, 98% of the population spoke only English as their sole mother tongue. The Government of Newfoundland and Labrador has no statutory language policy, simply having inherited English from colonial times. The island of Newfoundland was once the homeland of the Beothuk language, and also seen some Mi'kmaq speakers. The Labrador coast is home to the Innu-aimun and Inuttut languages. Newfoundland was also home to unique regional dialects of the French and Irish Gaelic languages, now extinct, as well as smaller groups of Old Norse, Basque, Spanish, Portuguese, German, and Scots Gaelic speakers. Today the Government offers minimal French-language services through its French-language website, in all other respects, it is English-only, including in the legislature, the courts, the schools, and the civil service.

== Comparison table ==
Province or Territory	Legislation on official language policy	Ministry or department responsible for language policy	Other legislation	Legal cases	Other agencies	Language(s) of the Legislature	Language(s) of the Courts	Language(s) of the Civil Service	Language(s) of the Schools	Language policies affecting businesses and private citizens
Alberta	Languages Act	Francophone Secretariat	School Act and French Policy: Action Plan (2018–2021, 2020–2023, 2024-2028)	Mahe	Conseil consultatif de l'Alberta en matière de francophonie and L'Association bilingue des municipalités de l’Albert / The Alberta Bilingual Municipalities Association	English and French	English and French	English	English and French	None
Manitoba	Manitoba Act, 1870	Minister responsible for Francophone Affairs	The Francophone Community Enhancement and Support Act	Reference Re Manitoba Language Rights		English and French	English and French	English and French	English and French	None
New Brunswick	Official Languages Act	Commissioner of Official Languages	An Act Recognizing the Equality of the Two Official Linguistic Communities in New Brunswick	Moncton (City) v. Charlebois		English and French	English and French	English and French	English and French	
Northwest Territories	Official Languages Act	Office of the Official Languages Commissioner of the Northwest Territories		Northwest Territories v Fédération Franco-ténoise		Inuktitut, Inuinnaqtun, Inuvialuktun, Gwich'in, North Slavey, South Slavey, Tłı̨chǫ, Chipewyan, Cree, English, and French.	Inuktitut, Inuinnaqtun, Inuvialuktun, Gwich'in, North Slavey, South Slavey, Tłı̨chǫ, Chipewyan, Cree, English, and French.	Inuktitut, Inuinnaqtun, Inuvialuktun, Gwich'in, North Slavey, South Slavey, Tłı̨chǫ, Chipewyan, Cree, English, and French.	Inuktitut, Inuinnaqtun, Inuvialuktun, Gwich'in, North Slavey, South Slavey, Tłı̨chǫ, Chipewyan, Cree, English, and French.	
Nova Scotia	French‑language Services Act (2004)	Minister of Acadian Affairs and Francophonie	and French‑language Services Regulations (2006) and The Canada-Nova Scotia Agreement on Minority-language Services	Doucet-Boudreau	Université Sainte-Anne, Le fonds communautaire Vive l'Acadie, and the Office of Acadian Affairs and Francophonie	English and French	English and French	English and French	English and French	none
Nunavut	Official Languages Act	Office of the Languages Commissioner for Nunavut	Inuit Language Protection Act and Education Act		Minister of Languages, Inuit Uqausinginnik Taiguusiliuqtiit and the Federal Commissioner of Official Languages	English, Inuit language (sometimes), French (rarely)	English (predominantly, some Inuit language, rarely French)	English (predominantly, some Inuit language, rarely French)	Varies by school	Inuit Language Protection Act
Ontario	French Language Services Act	Office of Francophone Affairs	Education Act		Office of the French Language Services Commissioner	English and French	English and French	English and French (in some regions)	English and French	none
Prince Edward Island	French Language Services Act	Acadian and Francophone Affairs Secretariat		Arsenault-Cameron	Collège de l'Île	English and French	English and French	English and French	English and French	none
Quebec	Charter of the French Language "Bill 101"	Office québécois de la langue française	Bill 86	Ford		English and French	English and French	French	English and French	French is required for some businesses, no French is required by law for private citizens.
Saskatchewan	Language Act / Loi linguistique	Executive Council and Office of the Premier / Conseil exécutif et Bureau du premier ministre.	Education Act, 1995 / Loi de 1995 sur l'éducation	R v Mercure	Francophone Affairs Branch (French-language Service Centre) / Direction des affaires francophones (Centre de services en langue française Bonjour!).	English and French	English and French	English	English and French	None
Yukon	Languages Act					English, French, Yukon Aboriginal languages	English and French	English and French	English and French	

== Evaluation of provincial language policy ==
In its January 2012 report on the costs and benefits of official bilingualism at the provincial level in Canada, the think tank, Fraser Institute, identified several potential methods for classifying the provinces based on language circumstances and policies (territories were not included).

First it stated that linguistic minorities were only of a significant size in three provinces, either in absolute numbers (Quebec [575,000] and Ontario [489,000]) or as a proportion (New Brunswick [just over 30%]), while in the other seven provinces minority communities are quite small, as low as 1.3% in British Columbia.

Second, the report suggested that in six of the provinces, governments only offer those minority-language services they are obliged to under Section 23 of the Charter (i.e. education). In three provinces (Manitoba, New Brunswick, and Quebec) there are other constitutional rights that come into play, over and above Section 23. In Ontario, there is a developed policy of statutory (not constitutional) minority language rights.

== See also ==
- Official bilingualism in Canada
