= Bilingual belt =

Bilingual English-French areas of Canada

The bilingual belt (French: la ceinture bilingue) is a term for the portion of Canada where both French and English are regularly spoken. The term was coined by Richard Joy in his 1967 book Languages in Conflict, where he wrote, "The language boundaries in Canada are hardening, with the consequent elimination of minorities everywhere except within a relatively narrow bilingual belt."

Joy's analysis of the 1961 census caused him to conclude:

The pattern so common during the 19th Century, of English- and French-speaking communities intermingled within the same geographical region, is now found only along the borders of Quebec Province, within a zone of transition separating French Canada from the English-speaking continent. This 'Bilingual Belt' includes Northern Ontario, the Ottawa Valley, Montreal, the Eastern Townships of Quebec and the northern counties of New Brunswick.

== Overview ==
The bilingual belt. In most of Canada, either English or French is predominant. Only in the intermittent "belt" stretching between northern Ontario and northern New Brunswick, and in a few other isolated pockets, do the two languages mix on a regular basis. English English and French (bilingual belt) French Sparsely populated areas (less than 0.4 people per km^{2})

The bilingual belt is the frontier zone on either side of what Joy referred to as "Interior Quebec"—the heartland of the French language in North America, in which, in the 1961 census, over 95% of the population gave French as their mother tongue and 2% speak only English. The bilingual belt is, therefore, the "region of contact" between the Quebec heartland in which French is the overwhelmingly predominant language and the rest of Canada, in which English is the overwhelmingly predominant language.

When the bilingual belt is added to the French language heartland of "Interior Quebec", the result is:

an area 1,000 miles long, bounded on the West by a line drawn from Sault Ste. Marie through Ottawa to Cornwall and on the East by a line from Edmonston to Moncton....[O]ver 90% of all Canadians who claimed to have a knowledge of the French language were found within the Soo-Moncton limits. Outside this area, not one person in twenty could speak French, and not one in forty would use it as the language of the home.

Joy recognized the continued (although diminished) existence of residual French-speaking communities in places like Yarmouth, Nova Scotia and Saint Boniface, Manitoba, but these communities were isolated and very small, and were, in his view, already well on the way to extinction, along with most of the smaller pockets of English-speakers within Quebec. For example, he had this to say about the French language in Manitoba: "The Franco-Manitobans have resisted assimilation more effectively than have the minorities in the other Western Provinces, but the 1961 Census reported only 6,341 children of French mother tongue, as against 12,337 of French origin. This could well indicate that the actual numbers, and not merely the relative strength, of those who retain the old language will soon start to fall."

== Regions within the bilingual belt ==
Strictly speaking, the bilingual belt has never been a single contiguous region. Instead, the parts of the bilingual belt lying within Ontario and west Quebec form one geographical unit, and the part in northern New Brunswick formed a separate geographical unit. Joy also noted that there was considerable demographic variation within the bilingual belt itself, based on such factors as proximity to the unilingual French-speaking heartland of "Interior Quebec" and the ratio in any particular part of the bilingual belt of native French-speakers to native English-speakers. He summarized these regional divisions as follows:

In New Brunswick
In seven counties in the province's north and north-east, French was the mother tongue of 59% of the population. Joy indicated that in this region, rates of bilingualism were high among francophones but that French "is spoken by practically none" of the Anglophones in this part of the bilingual belt.
In Quebec
Joy pointed to a strip of territory running from the Eastern Townships westward through Montreal to Pontiac County. In this region, French was the mother tongue of 70% of the population, and English of the remaining 30%. The rates of bilingualism were 40% for persons with French as their mother tongue, and "less than a third" for persons with English as their mother tongue.
In Ontario
This part of the bilingual belt consisted of "the eleven counties which form a band, along the Quebec border, running from the St. Lawrence River to the Upper Lakes". Joy reported that in this region, French was the mother tongue of 30% of the population, and that fewer than one quarter of persons of French descent had been assimilated.

== Demographic trends in more recent years ==
Demographic data from more recent censuses indicate that the geographic extent of the bilingual belt has remained largely unchanged in the nearly half century since the 1961 census, although assimilation and migration patterns have caused some population characteristics to change over time. Most notably, rates of bilingualism among the English-mother tongue population in the Quebec part of the bilingual belt are now far higher than they were in 1961.

Based on the 2011 census data, 85.7% of Canadians with knowledge of both official languages live within Quebec, Ontario and New Brunswick, the three provinces which comprise Canada's bilingual belt. Only 14% of Canadians with knowledge of both official languages live outside of those three provinces.

The bilingual belt also contains the high proportion of individuals who are incapable of speaking the official language of the province. For example, in Quebec, approximately 5% of Quebecers (or 1% of Canadians overall) reported that they can only speak English.

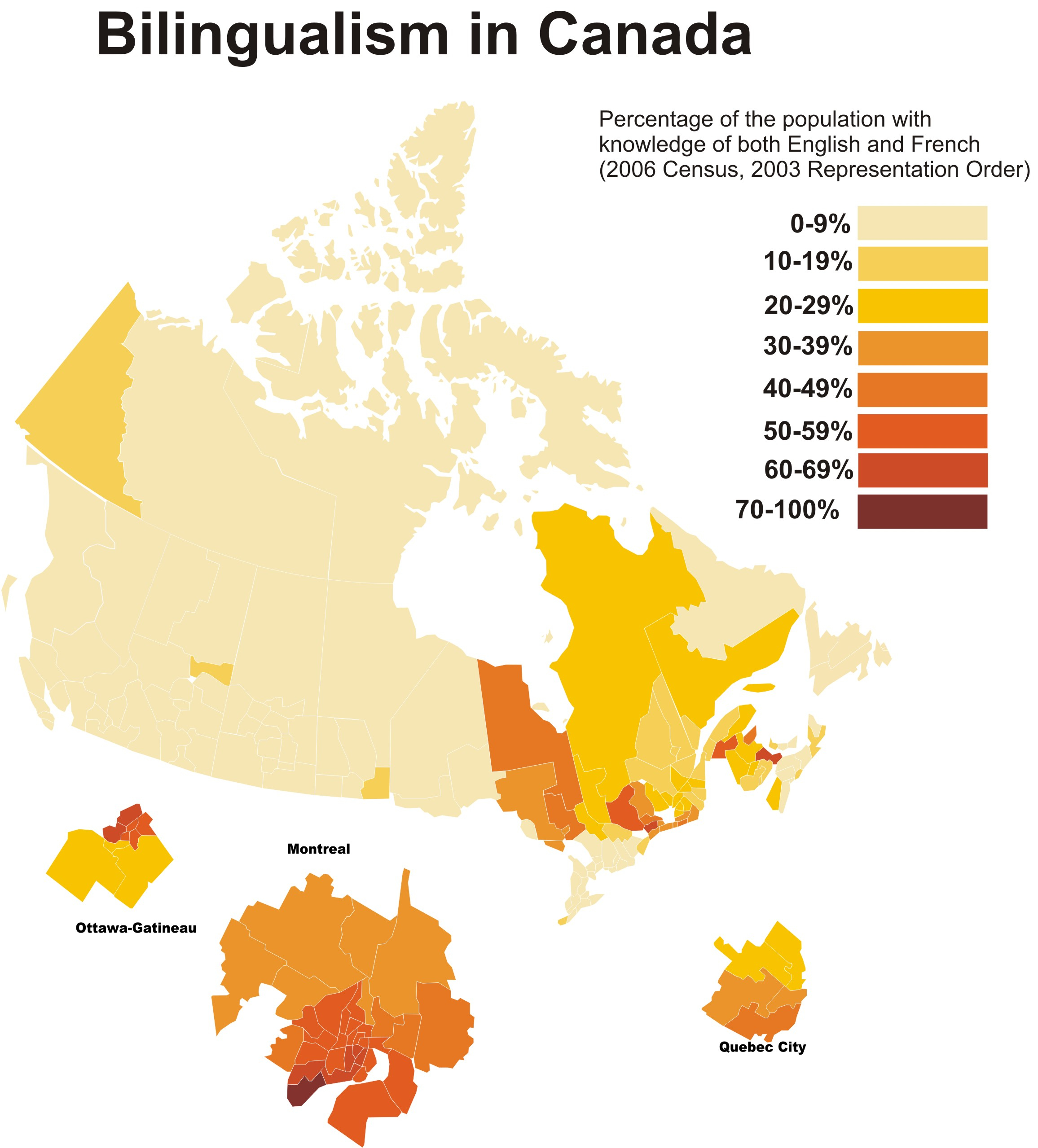
Bilingualism in Canada.
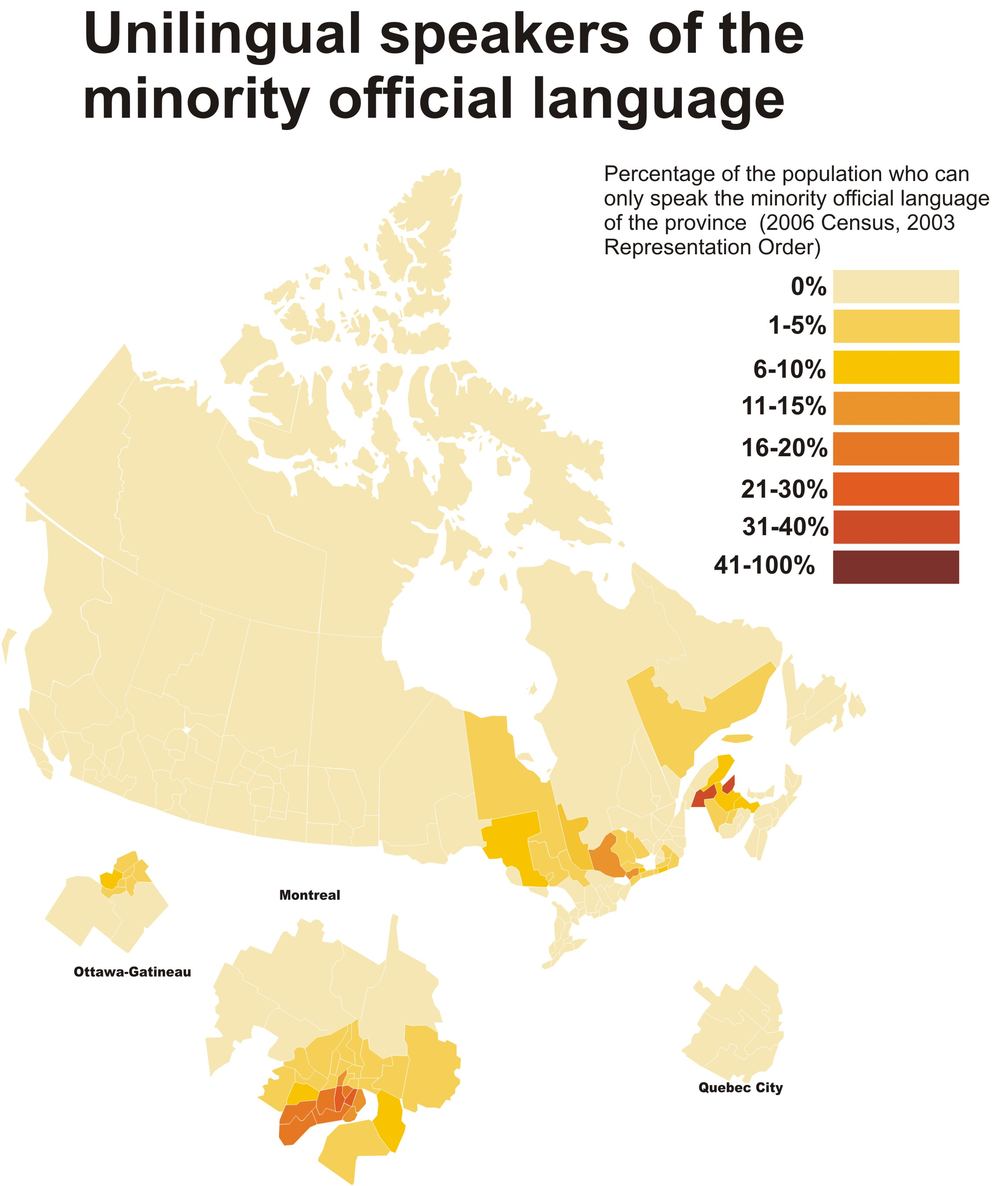
Canadians who can only speak the minority official language (English in Quebec, French everywhere else).

Bilingualism by province/territory based on 2016 Canadian census data

Province/Territory	Total population	Numbers of persons with knowledge of both official languages	Percentage of persons with knowledge of both official languages
Ontario	13,312,865	1,490,390	11.1%
Quebec	8,164,361	3,586,410	43.9%
British Columbia	4,648,055	314,925	9.6%
Alberta	4,067,175	264,720	6.5%
Manitoba	1,278,365	108,460	8.4%
Saskatchewan	1,098,352	51,360	4.7%
Nova Scotia	923,598	95,380	10.3%
New Brunswick	747,101	249,950	33.4%
Newfoundland and Labrador	519,716	25,940	5.0%
Prince Edward Island	142,907	17,840	12.5%
Northwest Territories	41,786	4,275	10.2%
Yukon	35,874	4,900	13.7%
Nunavut	35,944	1,525	4.2%
Canada	35,151,728	6,216,065	17.7%

Geographical distribution of all Canadians (pictured on left) and geographical distribution of bilingual Canadians (pictured on right)

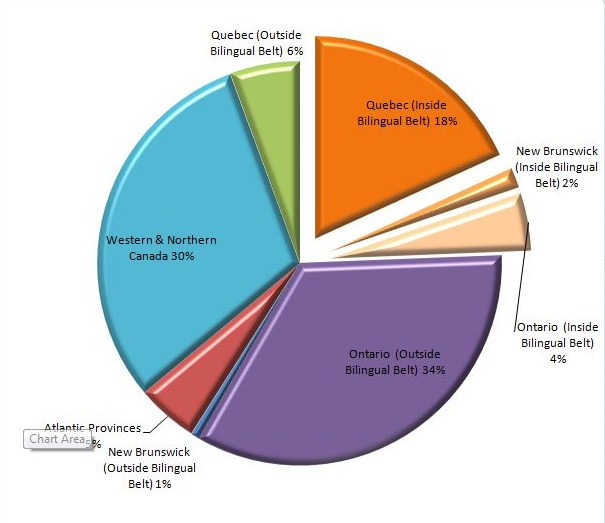
Geographical Distribution of All Canadians.

Geographical Distribution of Bilingual Canadians.

== Bilingualism rate in Canada's largest cities ==
According to Statistics Canada (2021), rates of bilingualism in both official languages in Canada's ten largest cities are as follows:

City	Bilingualism rate
Montreal	59%
Quebec City	43%
Ottawa	36%
Winnipeg	10%
Toronto	9%
Vancouver	9%
Calgary	7%
Edmonton	7%
Hamilton	6%
Kitchener	6%

== See also ==
- Acadia
- Anglo-Quebecer
- Franco-Ontarian
- Official bilingualism in Canada
- Spoken languages of Canada
