= Société des Acadiens et Acadiennes du Nouveau-Brunswick Inc v Canada =

- Supreme Court of Canada

Hearing: 17 October 2007 Judgment: 11 April 2008
- Full case name: Société des Acadiens et Acadiennes du Nouveau-Brunswick Inc v Her Majesty The Queen
- Citations: 2008 SCC 15, 2008 1 SCR 383
- Docket No.: 31583
- Prior history: APPEAL from Société des Acadiens et Acadiennes du Nouveau-Brunswick Inc v Canada, 2006 FCA 196
- Ruling: Appeal allowed.

Holding
- The RCMP must offer bilingual service when under a provincial policing contract with the government of New Brunswick.

Court membership
- Chief Justice: Beverley McLachlin; Puisne Justices: Michel Bastarache, Ian Binnie, Louis LeBel, Marie Deschamps, Morris Fish, Rosalie Abella, Louise Charron, Marshall Rothstein

Reasons given
- Unanimous reasons by: Bastarache J

Société des Acadiens et Acadiennes du Nouveau-Brunswick Inc v Canada, 2008 SCC 15 is a Canadian constitutional law case, dealing with the language standards imposed by section 20(2) of the Charter of Rights and Freedoms on the Royal Canadian Mounted Police pursuant to their duties as New Brunswick's police force.

== Background ==
In 1992, the Royal Canadian Mounted Police (RCMP) signed an agreement with the New Brunswick government whereby the RCMP would provide provincial policing services, pursuant to section 20 of the federal Royal Canadian Mounted Police Act (RCMPA) and section 2 of the New Brunswick Police Act.

In 2000, Marie-Claude Paulin was issued a speeding ticket near Woodstock by an RCMP officer who did not speak with her in French. Paulin sought a declaratory action affirming her right to receive service in French under section 20(2) of the Charter. The Société des Acadiens et Acadiennes du Nouveau-Brunswick (SAANB) joined Paulin's action in Federal Court. The RCMP argued that section 20(2) of the Charter did not apply to their institution because they were a federal institution, meaning that only the lesser section 20(1) Charter provision would apply.

The trial judge, Gauthier J, sided with Paulin and the SAANB, holding that providing New Brunswick's provincial policing services sufficed to make the RCMP a New Brunswick institution for the purpose of section 20(2) of the Charter.

The RCMP appealed to the Federal Court of Appeal. Richard CJ allowed the appeal, holding that the RCMP was not a New Brunswick institution, that the issue was primarily one of contract law, not constitutional law, and that the respondents should have brought the action against the province, not in Federal Court.

The case was appealed to the Supreme Court of Canada. Paulin and the SAANB argued that section 20(1) of the Charter did not prevent the RCMP from being subject to the stricter section 20(2) language standard, and that the RCMP's powers within New Brunswick arose from section 2(2) of the New Brunswick Police Act, making them a New Brunswick institution. The RCMP argued that, per Eldridge v British Columbia (AG), the government of New Brunswick could not delegate its constitutional obligation to oversee the administration of justice, and that the RCMP could not simultaneously be a federal and provincial institution.

== Judgment of the SCC ==
Bastarache J, writing for a unanimous Court, allowed Paulin and the SAANB's appeal. Bastarache J confirmed that the RCMP is a federal institution even when contracting with a province, per Doucet v Canada, and that section 20(1) of the Charter applies. However, Bastarache J found that the RCMP's status as a federal institution is not determinative of the issue. Due to section 20 of the RCMPA and section 2(2) of the Police Act, RCMP officers who administer justice within a province "perform the role of an 'institution of the legislature or government'". Further, since the RCMP is under contract to the provincial government, and since their policing activities are ultimately controlled by the provincial Minister of Justice, the RCMP are an institution of the provincial government and thus must comply with the constitutional obligation set out in section 20(2) of the Charter.
