= Equal authenticity rule =

Rule of judicial interpretation developed by Canadian courts

The equal authenticity rule (French: règle d’égale autorité) is a rule of judicial interpretation developed by Canadian courts as a way of interpreting laws written in parallel English and French texts. The constitution of Canada requires that both versions of each bilingual law be treated as equally authoritative, which can result in problems when the English and French versions are incongruent. The equal authenticity rule is derived from section 133 of the Constitution Act, 1867, which states that "The Acts of the Parliament of Canada and the Legislature of Quebec shall be printed and published in both those Languages."

== History ==
The rule requires courts to treat "both [the English and French] versions of statutes [as] equally valid and authoritative interpretations of the law." The rule holds that both versions are equally authoritative even if the statute in question was clearly drafted in one language and translated into the other, and even if the two versions of the law are incompatible.

An early version of the principle may be found a statute of the Parliament of the Province of Canada, enacted in 1857. The Act respecting the Codification of the Laws of Lower Canada relative to Civil Matters and Procedure requires that the Civil Code of Lower Canada be printed only in bilingual form, with English and French displayed on the same page: "[T]he two texts, when printed, shall stand side by side." It has been suggested that this provision of the 1857 Act is "best understood as a non-verbal legislative sign that the two texts should be interpreted dialogically." Whether or not this is an overstatement, it is certainly true that side-by-side publication was the first step towards the eventual adoption of the equal authenticity rule for interpreting bilingual statutes.

== Current application ==
=== Federal and Quebec statutes ===
The equal authenticity rule was developed by the Supreme Court of Canada in 1891, in the court’s ruling in CPR v. Robinson. That case dealt with the Civil Code of Quebec, which is enacted in both French and English.

By implication, the rule also related to all laws enacted by the Parliament of Canada, as section 133 of the Constitution Act, 1867 is equally binding upon the federal Parliament and Quebec legislation. The Supreme Court of Canada first applied this rule of judicial interpretation to Acts of Parliament in 1935, in its ruling in the case of R. v. Dubois. The rule was reaffirmed with respect to federal statutes as subsection 18(1) of the Canadian Charter of Rights and Freedoms, when the constitution was patriated in 1982.

=== New Brunswick statutes ===
New Brunswick is also constitutionally required to enact their statutes bilingually. Section 18(2) of the Charter provides that "both language versions are equally authoritative".

=== Manitoba statutes ===
The Manitoba Act, 1870 requires the province of Manitoba to enact its statutes bilingually. The Manitoba Act, 1870 does not have an express statement of equal authenticity, but it is likely implied by the requirement of bilingual enactment, similar to the rule for federal and Quebec statutes under s. 133 of the Constitution Act, 1867.

=== Other provinces ===
==== Express provision for equal authenticity ====
Some other provinces have opted to enact some or all of their statutes bilingually, although not required by the Constitution to do so. A province which provides for bilingual enactment can expressly provide for equal authenticity in its legislation.

For example, Saskatchewan has done so in The Language Act / Loi linguistique of Saskatchewan. Section 10 of that Act provides:

10 Where an Act or regulation is enacted, printed and published in English and French, the English version and the French version are equally authoritative.

Ontario has a similar provision in its Legislation Act.

==== Unresolved issue regarding the application of the rule ====
One question, not yet tested in the courts, "arises...as to whether both versions of bilingual legislation enacted in a province where there is no constitutional requirement to do so would be considered equally authoritative in the absence of an express Equal Authenticity Rule." Bastarache et al., who raise this question, answer it in the affirmative, explaining that in their view, "the logic applicable to federal, Quebec and Manitoba legislation under the Constitution would also apply [even in the absence of a legislated statement of this logic]: that is, where two languages [sic] versions of a statute are enacted simultaneously both versions will be considered equally authoritative."
