= Richard Joy =

Canadian linguist (1924–1998)

- Born: 1924; Montreal, Quebec, Canada
- Died: June 26, 1998 (aged 73–74); Ottawa, Ontario, Canada
- Education: McGill University; Harvard University
- Occupation: Linguist

Richard J. Joy (1924 – June 26, 1998) was a Canadian linguist who authored several books on language demographics in Canada.

== Early life and education ==
Joy was born in Montreal. He received a bachelor's degree from McGill University in 1945 and a master's degree from Harvard University in 1947.

== Career and works ==
In 1967, he self-published the groundbreaking book, Languages in Conflict: The Canadian Experience, in which he used statistics from the 1961 census to demonstrate a number of points which ran counter to the accepted wisdom of the day:

- Birthrates in Quebec were plunging, which meant that the French language could no longer keep pace with English purely through natural increase;
- French was in serious decline outside of Quebec and a bilingual belt stretching eastwards into New Brunswick and west into eastern and north-eastern Ontario;
- English was in decline in all parts of Quebec other than Montreal.

Based on these considerations, Joy came to the following sombre conclusion:

The forecast, therefore, emerges of a Canada in which the relative strengths of the two major language groups may remain similar to those found today but within which there will be a much more pronounced linguistic segregation: French within Quebec and English elsewhere.

Although Montreal may well retain its bilingual character, the English-speaking population of other parts of Quebec will probably decline in actual numbers, nor merely in relative strength. Outside Quebec, French will continue to be spoken in the border counties of Ontario and New Brunswick but will virtually disappear from Southern Ontario, the Atlantic Region, and the Western Provinces....

If this forecast is accurate, then our politicians and editors should commence now to prepare the public for the inevitable by showing that the disappearance of linguistic minorities is a natural phenomenon, rather than the consequence of some "genocidal" plot.

If the public is not so prepared, then the psychological shock when the minorities do disappear could be more harmful to Canadian unity than will be the actual disappearance.

In 1972, the book was re-published by Carleton University Press.

Joy updated his findings periodically, based on the results of the most recent decennial census. His second book, Canada's Official Language Minorities, was published by the C.D. Howe Institute in 1978.

His third book, Canada's Official Languages: The Progress of Bilingualism, was published by the University of Toronto Press in 1992. In this book, Joy concluded that “the data from the language questions of the 1986 census do not yield a straightforward answer to the administrator’s question: to what extent does the population of each municipality wish to be offered service in the minority language? …. What is required is a completely new question that will ask every Canadian his or her preferred official language.”

== See also ==
- Demographics of Canada
- Languages of Canada
- Official bilingualism in Canada
