= An Act Recognizing the Equality of the Two Official Linguistic Communities in New Brunswick =

Provincial law in New Brunswick, Canada

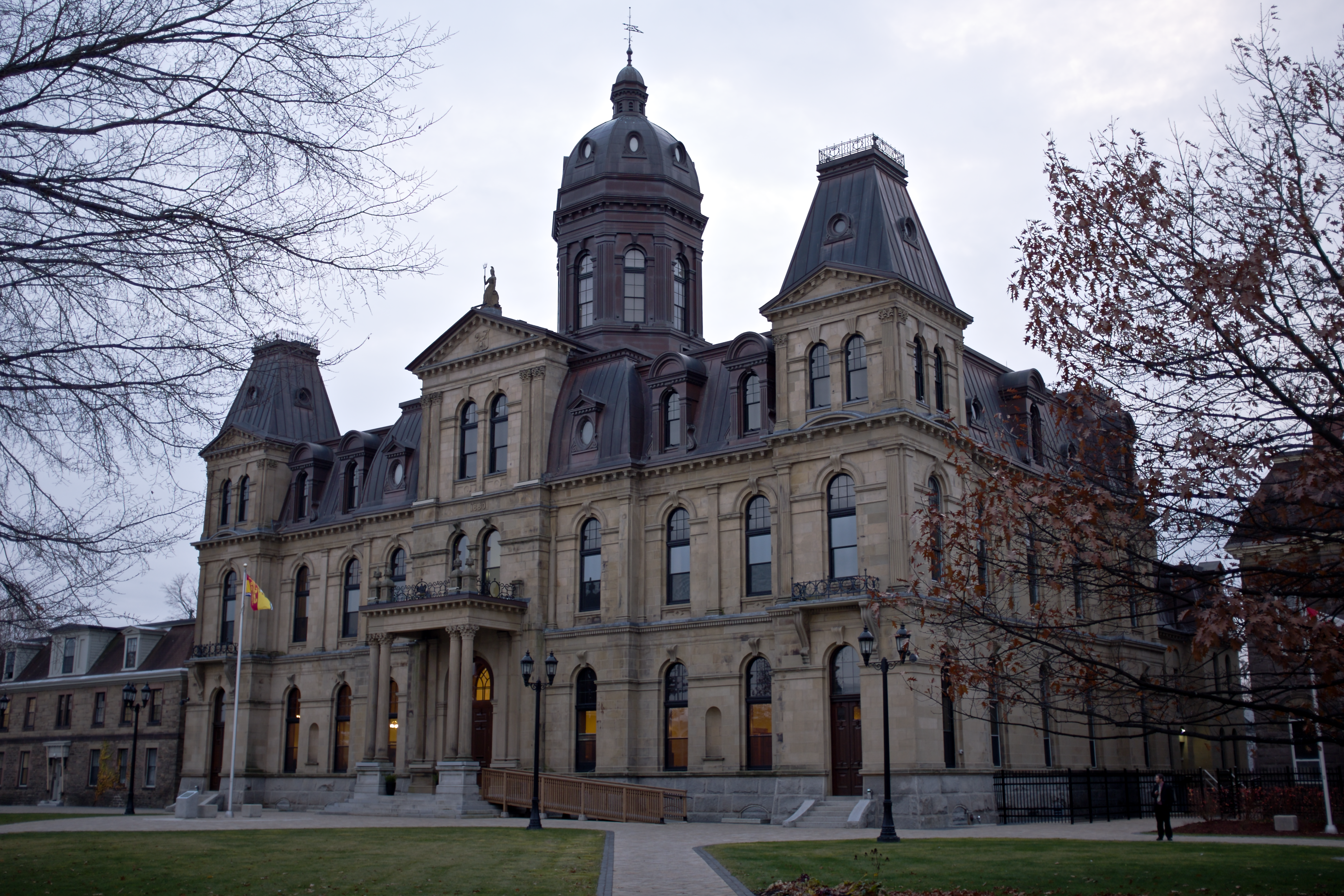

Legislative Assembly of New Brunswick
- Long title: An Act Recognizing the Equality of the Two Official Linguistic Communities in New Brunswick
- Citation: R.S.N.B. 2011, c. 198
- Status: Current legislation

Flag of the Acadians, an important linguistic community in the Maritime Provinces who are the descendants of French colonialists

An Act Recognizing the Equality of the Two Official Linguistic Communities in New Brunswick (Note: French: Loi reconnaissant l'égalité des deux communautés linguistiques officielles au Nouveau-Brunswick) or the more succinct Law 88, is a law adopted by the Legislative Assembly of New Brunswick, recognising the equality of the Anglophone and Francophone linguistic communities of the province.

== Description ==
On the 17 July 1981, the Legislative Assembly adopted the law, with consists of three articles. For the first time, the statutory equality of the Acadians as a linguistic community, and urges the provincial government to protect and promote the development of the Acadian community. Law 88, more commonly referred to as "Bill 88" in English, complemented the 1969 Official Languages of New Brunswick law, which established French and English as official languages of the legislature and of the provincial administration.

The law was, however, more declaratory than practical: "The vagueness of the legislation made it extremely difficult to implement. Consequently, it ... remained idle until its [later] inclusion in the companion resolution to the 1987 Meech Lake Accord". The so-called "companion resolution" was enacted in 1993 as Section 16.1 of the Canadian Charter of Rights and Freedoms.

== Reasons for introducing the law ==
In 1979, the Société des Acadiens du Nouveau Brunswick had voted, at a provincial conference, for the Acadian-majority areas in the north and north-east of the province to break away and form an independent Acadian province. As well, a separatist Acadian party had been formed. As Premier Richard Hatfield would later on explain, these considerations caused Michel Bastarache, a prominent Acadian lawyer, to recommend to the premier's French lieutenant that the government "come up with some initiative to satisfy 'les Acadiens', and Bill 88 was the result."

== See also ==
- Acadia
- Constitution of Canada
- Richard Hatfield
