= Doucet-Boudreau v Nova Scotia (Minister of Education) =

- Supreme Court of Canada

Hearing: October 4, 2002 Judgment: November 6, 2003
- Full case name: Glenda Doucet‑Boudreau, Alice Boudreau, Jocelyn Bourbeau, Bernadette Cormier‑Marchand, Yolande Levert and Cyrille Leblanc, in their name and in the name of all Nova Scotia parents who are entitled to the right, under Section 23 of the Canadian Charter of Rights and Freedoms, to have their children educated in the language of the minority, namely the French language, in publicly funded French-language school facilities, and Fédération des parents acadiens de la Nouvelle‑Écosse Inc. v. Attorney General of Nova Scotia
- Citations: [2003] 3 S.C.R. 3, 218 N.S.R. (2d) 311, 218 N.S.R. (2e) 311, 232 D.L.R. (4th) 577, 112 C.R.R. (2d) 202
- Docket No.: 28807
- Prior history: Judgment for the Attorney General in the Court of Appeal for Nova Scotia.
- Ruling: Appeal allowed, trial judge order restored.

Holding
- Section 24(1) of the Canadian Charter of Rights and Freedoms provides responsive and effective remedies for those whose Charter rights are violated; remedies may be creative, compared to traditional judicially awarded remedies.

Court membership
- Chief Justice: Beverley McLachlin; Puisne Justices: Charles Gonthier, Frank Iacobucci, John C. Major, Michel Bastarache, Ian Binnie, Louise Arbour, Louis LeBel, Marie Deschamps

Reasons given
- Majority: Iacobucci and Arbour, joined by McLachlin, Gonthier and Bastarache
- Dissent: LeBel and Deschamps, joined by Major and Binnie

Doucet-Boudreau v Nova Scotia (Minister of Education) [2003] 3 S.C.R. 3, 2003 SCC 62, was a decision of the Supreme Court of Canada which followed the Nova Scotia Supreme Court's finding that a delay in building French language schools in Nova Scotia violated the claimants' minority language educational rights under section 23 of the Canadian Charter of Rights and Freedoms. This finding led to an important debate regarding the scope of section 24(1) of the Charter, which provides for remedies for those whose rights are infringed, and the applicability of the common law doctrine of functus officio. While the Supreme Court of Canada split on what constitutes an appropriate usage of section 24(1), the majority favoured a section 24(1) with broad, flexible capabilities.

== Background ==
According to the Supreme Court of Canada, Nova Scotia's past had not been marked by a great deal of governmental action for providing education in French. After 1982, however, section 23 was added to the Constitution of Canada, thus creating a right for Francophone and Acadian Nova Scotians to schooling in their own language, provided that they were of a sufficient number. Several Francophone families in five school districts, Kingston/Greenwood, Chéticamp, Île Madame-Arichat (Petit-de-Grat), Argyle, and Clare, tried to invoke that right, requesting new buildings or programs for primary and secondary education, and the provincial government responded with affirmation that section 23 did indeed mandate that this request be fulfilled. This affirmation was, however, followed by delay, and in 1998, with no schools having been built, the minority language community turned to the Supreme Court of Nova Scotia to move the government to meet its obligation.

The court heard the case in October 1999. The court was led by Justice Arthur LeBlanc, who found that section 23 required new schools and programs for the families. Moreover, he ruled that the delay in construction also constituted an infringement of the claimants' section 23 rights. He reached the latter conclusion by pointing out that French language Nova Scotians were increasingly being absorbed into the English-language community. Hence, any further delay would eventually jeopardize the existence of the French community. Since the French community's requests were also anchored on a constitutional principle, they also deserved priority. Accordingly, LeBlanc used section 24(1) of the Charter to set deadlines and demand that the government report to him as construction progressed.

The obligation of the provincial government to report to Justice LeBlanc was disputed, as it was considered a violation of functus officio, in which a judge makes a ruling and afterwards has no authority. The Nova Scotia Court of Appeal sided with the government and overturned the requirement of reporting, citing concerns about moving Canada towards United States-style injunctions and upsetting the relationship between the Canadian court system and the government. The argument that section 23 gave the claimants a right to French programs and schools, however, was not questioned.

== Decision ==
While construction had been completed by the time the minority language families appealed their case to the Supreme Court of Canada, Justices Frank Iacobucci and Louise Arbour, writing for the majority of the Court, declined to set aside the case for mootness. They went on to vindicate the position of Justice LeBlanc and overturn the Court of Appeal.

=== Section 23 ===
The majority of the Supreme Court approved the creative method for enforcing section 23 partly by emphasizing the importance of section 23 and how it was always meant to be an enforceable right. Section 23, they wrote, has a "remedial nature... designed to correct past injustices not only by halting the progressive erosion of minority official language cultures across Canada, but also by actively promoting their flourishing." Hence, section 23 is a positive right requiring government action.

=== Section 24 ===
Regarding section 24, the majority cited past Charter cases such as R. v. Big M Drug Mart Ltd. (1986), Re B.C. Motor Vehicle Act (1985), and Vriend v. Alberta (1998) to point out that the courts have approached the Charter with a "generous and expansive interpretation and not a narrow, technical, or legalistic one." This style of interpretation, the majority felt, was just as applicable for remedies as rights, and they observed the broad wording of section 24(1), which merely dictates that the court will award a "remedy as the court considers appropriate and just in the circumstances." Since section 23 must be enforced, section 24(1) must be "responsive" to an infringement of the right, and since section 24(1) is itself an important part of the Charter, the remedy must be "effective." While judicial restraint is important, it is limited by the obligation of the Court to enforce constitutional rights.

The circumstances, which included the threat that the French language would eventually disappear, were judged to require a remedy that would ensure the right would be met in a reasonable amount of time. The section 24(1) phrase limiting remedies, requiring that they be "appropriate and just in the circumstances", was defined partly as giving the courts themselves the right to determine what was appropriate and just, although judges should be aware of doctrines such as functus officio. The Supreme Court also defined an "appropriate and just remedy," as being one that upholds the right, including with regard to circumstances. It is also appropriate and just to remember that as part of the constitution, and with broad wording, section 24 can "evolve to meet the challenges and circumstances of those cases" and can have "novel and creative features." The Court should avoid taking functions it could not hold and should be fair to the government, but in this case hearing reports was judged to allow the court to exercise its constitutional function to enforce rights. In addition, the court would not "improperly take over the detailed management and co-ordination of the construction projects."

With regard to functus officio, the Court ruled that this common law principle cannot invalidate section 24, although it is an important consideration. The Court ultimately concluded functus officio was not violated because the reports did not "alter a final judgment." While LeBlanc could see reports, he could not change his decision to further define section 23.

== Dissent ==
The justices who did not side with Iacobucci and Arbour did not dispute the applicability or importance of section 23. Instead, a dissent regarding the usage of section 24(1) was written by Justices Louis LeBel and Marie Deschamps. They justified their dissent on the grounds that in order for the courts to "avoid turning themselves into managers of the public service... Judicial interventions should end when and where the case of which a judge is seized is brought to a close." In their view, Justice LeBlanc seeing reports amounted to overseeing the construction, which violated functus officio and the separation of powers, which could, in turn, threaten judicial independence. The dissenting justices also felt Justice LeBlanc had an option not to require reports, and section 23 still could have been enforced.

Justice LeBlanc's expectations, moreover, were not judged to be clear enough to the government. Fundamental justice was thus seen as having been violated.

The majority responded to these concerns by arguing that "the approach taken by... LeBel and Deschamps JJ. which appears to contemplate that special remedies might be available in some circumstances, but not in this case, severely undervalues the importance and the urgency of the language rights in the context facing LeBlanc J."

== See also ==
- List of Supreme Court of Canada cases (McLachlin Court)
